= List of monuments in Rwanda =

This is a list of cultural heritage monuments in Rwanda.

== List of monuments in Kigali City ==
- Kigali Genocide Memorial
- Kandt House Museum
- Rwanda Art Museum
- St. Michael cathedral
- Sainte-Famille Church
- Anti-corruption Monument
- Belgian Peacekeepers Memorial
- Regina Pacis Catholic Church
- Amahoro National Stadium
- Nyamata Genocide Memorial
- Gikondo Prison
- Gisimba Memorial Centre
- King Faisal Hospital Kigali
- Museum for Campaign Against Genocide

== List of monuments in Southern Province ==
- King's Palace Museum
- National Art Gallery
- Mwima Mausoleum
- King Christ Catholic Church
- Huye Ethnographic Museum
- Mutara III Rudahigwa 's Palace
- Our Lady of Wisdom Cathedral, Butare
- Cathedral Basilica of Our Lady

== List of monuments in Western Province ==
- Urutare rwa Ndaba
- Jesus's House of Mercy in Ruhango (Mu rugo rwa Yezu Nyirimpuhwe)
- Our Lady of Kibeho Shrine
- Byumba cathedral
- Butare Catholic cathedral
- Bisesero Genocide Memorial Centre

== List of monuments in Eastern Province ==
- Utubindi twa Rubona (The Pots of Rubona )
- Urutare Rwa Ngarama (Ngarama rock)
- Ku kirenge cya Ruganzu (Ruganzu's footprints)
- Ntarama Genocide Memorial Centre
- Nyamata Genocide Memorial Centre

== List of monuments in Northern Province ==
- Ku kirenge cya Ruganzu
