= Kamonyi Genocide Memorial =

- The Kamonyi Genocide Memorial, August 2025
- Interactive map of Kamonyi Genocide Memorial
- Location: Kibuza, Gacurabwenge Sector, Kamonyi District, Southern Province, Rwanda
- Coordinates: 2.008026°S 29.895813°E
- Type: Genocide memorial
- Dedicated to: 1994 genocide against the Tutsi

The Kamonyi Genocide Memorial is a memorial site for victims of the 1994 genocide against the Tutsi. It is located in Gacurabwenge Sector, Kamonyi District, in the Southern Province of Rwanda.

The memorial honours the Tutsi killed in the area in 1994. More than 47,000 victims are buried in its mass graves. The site stands at Kibuza, beside the Kigali–Huye road.

== Location ==
Path to the memorial, August 2025

The memorial is on Kibuza hill, in Gacurabwenge Sector. This sector is also the seat of Kamonyi District. The site lies beside the paved Kigali–Muhanga road, which is part of the Kigali–Huye road. It is near the Gacurabwenge Sector office and is easy to reach from Kigali.

Before 1994, the Kamonyi area was part of Gitarama Prefecture. Research by the National Commission for the Fight against Genocide (CNLG) shows that commune and national officials there urged the population to carry out the genocide. Testimonies say that Tutsi were driven from nearby parishes and markets to the Kibuza area. Many were killed there in attacks by the Interahamwe and soldiers. Their remains were later moved to the Kamonyi memorial.

== History ==
After the genocide, survivors and victims' families collected the remains of Tutsi killed in Musambira, Gacurabwenge and nearby communes. They were helped by local authorities and the survivors' association Ibuka. The remains were brought to Kibuza hill. The site was slowly developed into a memorial with brick mass graves, collective tombs and a place of remembrance.

In the mid-2000s, the British charity Survivors Fund (SURF) funded a building near the memorial for remembrance work and archives. In 2015, this building was officially handed over to the CNLG. It was to be used as a research centre on the genocide against the Tutsi.

In 2025, the Ministry of National Unity and Civic Engagement (MINUBUMWE) announced that a national centre for archives and research on the history of the genocide would open in Kamonyi. The aim was to make Kamonyi a hub for research and remembrance.

== Features ==
The memorial seen from the road, August 2025

The memorial has concrete mass graves. They hold the remains of thousands of victims from different places in the area, especially the former Musambira commune. Stones and markers recall the killings at Kibuza and in the nearby sectors.

The memorial hosts Kwibuka commemoration ceremonies. Groups of students and delegations from public and private institutions also visit it for civic education and remembrance. The research building funded by SURF is used for training, meetings of survivors and work on the history and prevention of genocide.

== See also ==
- Rwandan genocide
- List of Rwandan genocide memorials
- Kamonyi District
- Kabgayi Genocide Memorial
- Murambi Genocide Memorial Centre
