= Karama Genocide Memorial =

- The Karama Genocide Memorial, August 2025
- Interactive map of Karama Genocide Memorial
- Location: Karama Sector, Huye District, Southern Province, Rwanda
- Coordinates: 2.608553°S 29.643901°E
- Type: Genocide memorial
- Dedicated to: 1994 genocide against the Tutsi

The Karama Genocide Memorial is a memorial site for victims of the 1994 genocide against the Tutsi. It is located in Karama Sector, Huye District, in the Southern Province of Rwanda.

In April 1994, thousands of Tutsi gathered at the Catholic parish of Karama, where they were told they would be safe. Most of them were killed on 21 April 1994. The memorial now holds the remains of about 70,000 victims.

== Location ==
The memorial is in Karama Sector, one of the fourteen sectors of Huye District. It stands near the Catholic church of Karama, on high ground. It is reached by a dirt road from the road between Huye and Nyaruguru.

In 1994, Karama was part of Runyinya commune, in Butare Prefecture.

== History ==
Sign showing the way to the memorial, August 2025

=== 1994 massacre ===
During the genocide, local officials sent Tutsi fleeing attacks in Runyinya and nearby communes to the Catholic parish of Karama. They were told it was a place of refuge. The refugees were gathered in the church, the schools and the nearby market. A count in April 1994 recorded about 75,000 people at Karama a few days before the massacre.

The refugees were besieged and starved. Their main water source was poisoned. On 21 April 1994, at about 10 a.m., soldiers, gendarmes and militiamen attacked. Local villagers joined them. The attackers used grenades, guns and machetes. The killing went on until the afternoon. Many of those who fled towards Burundi were chased and killed on the way. Estimates of the number killed at Karama range from 40,000 to more than 50,000.

=== Creation of the memorial ===
After 1994, the mass graves around Karama were slowly exhumed. The remains were gathered in a temporary building on the parish grounds. In 2011, funds were allocated to build a proper memorial. Remains from 1,335 pits recorded in the former Runyinya commune were later reburied at the site.

The memorial holds the remains of about 70,000 victims. Survivors and local leaders have asked for new exhibition buildings and a better access road. They have also asked for the site to become a district-level memorial.

== Commemoration ==
Every year, Kwibuka ceremonies are held at the memorial. On 21 April 2024, members of the Parliament of Rwanda, led by the President of the Senate, François-Xavier Kalinda, attended the commemoration. Five victims of the genocide were buried at the memorial on that day. In June 2018, staff of the Ministry of Justice, led by minister Johnston Busingye, visited the memorial.

== See also ==
- Rwandan genocide
- List of Rwandan genocide memorials
- Huye District
- Cyarwa Genocide Memorial
- Murambi Genocide Memorial Centre
