= Charles A. Adeogun-Phillips =

English lawyer

Charles A Adeogun-Phillips, SAN
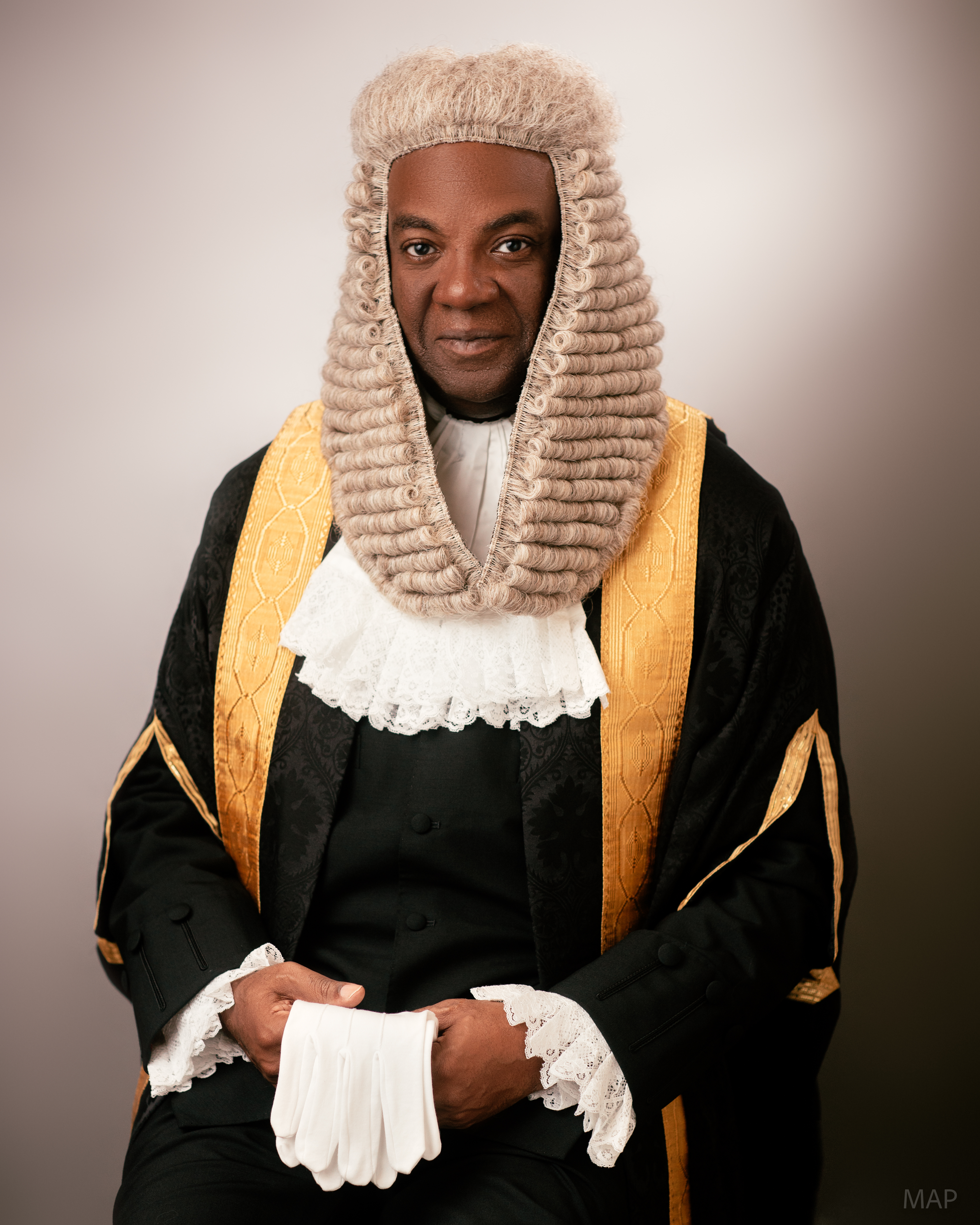

Personal details
- Born: 6 March 1966 (age 60) London England
- Citizenship: United Kingdom
- Parents: Professor Anthony Adeyemi Adeogun (father); Margaret Amba Ayinke Adeogun (mother)
- Education: University of Warwick
- Profession: Lawyer

Dr. Charles Ayodeji Adeogun-Phillips, SAN (born 6 March 1966 in London, England) International lawyer, who previously served as lead genocide prosecutor and head of special investigations at the United Nations, and has attained the highest academic and professional recognition in the field of law.

== Background ==
He is the son of Professor Anthony Adeyemi Adeogun, professor emeritus of commercial and industrial law and deputy vice-chancellor, University of Lagos, an international labour law expert. His mother, Margaret Amba Ayinke Adeogun (née Williams), is a retired nurse and midwife.

He is a grandson of Phillip Bamgbose and Theresa Fatola Adeogun of Ajale Compound Igbajo, Osun State, Federal Republic of Nigeria, and of Henry Isaac Kobina-Badu Williams, of Cape Coast, Republic of Ghana and Joanna Olasumbo Williams of Itesi, Abeokuta, Ogun State, Federal Republic of Nigeria. His name "Ayodeji" means "My joy is doubled" in Yoruba.

== Education ==
He was educated at C.M.S Grammar School, Lagos, Nigeria's first secondary school (founded in 1859) and at the prestigious British boarding school, Repton(founded in 1557). He read law at Warwick University from where he graduated in 1989 and at the School of Oriental and African Studies (SOAS), University of London, where he obtained his master's degree in law in 1994. In 2019, he was invited by his Alma Mata, Warwick University, to address the graduating class of that year.

In 2022, he was honoured with an LL. D by the same university in recognition of his pioneering and distinguished legal career at the United Nations and his contribution to the development of international criminal law.

Professionally, Charles was admitted as a Barrister and Solicitor of the Supreme Court of Nigeria in 1992 and in 1996, as a Solicitor of the Superior Courts of England and Wales. In 2021, he was called to the Bar of England and Wales as a transferring Solicitor, by the Honourable Society of Lincoln's Inn. He was conferred with the rank of Senior Advocate of the Federal Republic of Nigeria by the Chief Justice of Nigeria in 2024.

== International Prosecution career ==
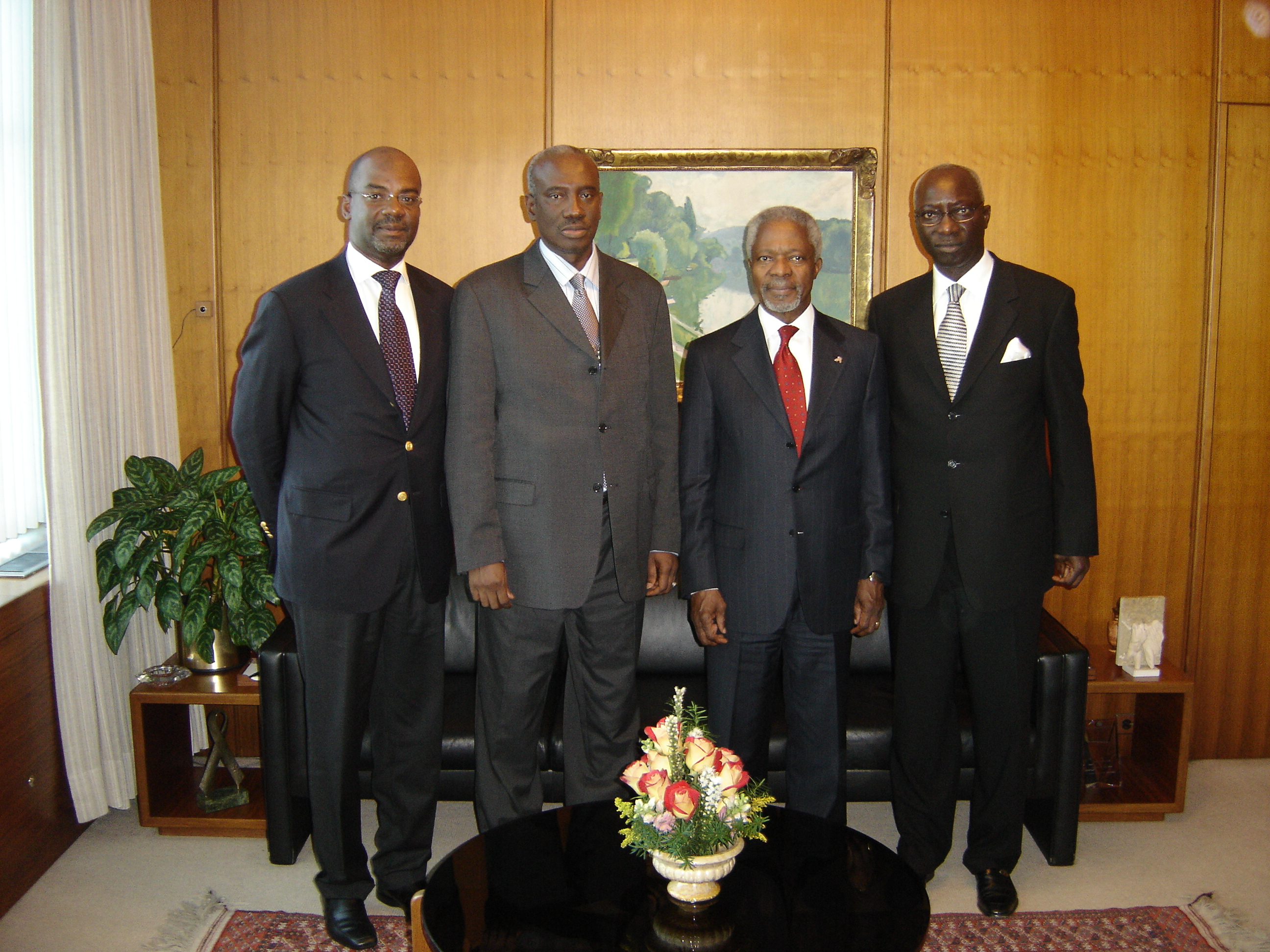
Charles at UNHQ, New York, with Under-Secretary-General Hassan Jallow, UN Secretary-General Kofi Annan and UN Under-Secretary-General Adama Dieng

Charles joined the Office of the Prosecutor (OTP) at the United Nations International Criminal Tribunal for Rwanda (UN-ICTR) from practice in the United Kingdom, having been appointed by the then Chief Prosecutor of the UN-ICTY/UN-ICTR, Justice Louise Arbour (Judge of the Supreme Court of Canada and later UN High Commissioner for Human Rights) in January 1998. What he had initially thought would be a short-term sabbatical from the rigors of regular practice as a criminal defense solicitor in the City of London, eventually lasted for well over a decade.

Between January 1998 and June 2010, Charles successfully led teams of international prosecutors in 12 precedent-setting genocide trials, wherein he obtained genocide convictions against 12 out of a total of 62 defendants convicted by the ICTR and is widely regarded as one of the leading, most experienced, and successful genocide prosecutors in the world.

His elevation as lead prosecutor before an international court at the age of 34, by the then Chief Prosecutor of the ICTY/ICTR, Ms. Carla Del Ponte (former Attorney-General of Switzerland), was equally unrivalled. He also, between 2007 and 2008, doubled as head of special investigations in the Office of the Prosecutor, under the leadership of Justice Hassan B. Jallow (Chief Justice of The Gambia).

His mandate as lead prosecutor was to lead and direct teams of international prosecutors and investigators in the trials of persons who bore the greatest responsibility for the massacres of men women and children in the Kibuye, Bisesero and Bugesera regions – the main Tutsi strongholds during the 1994 Rwandan genocide.

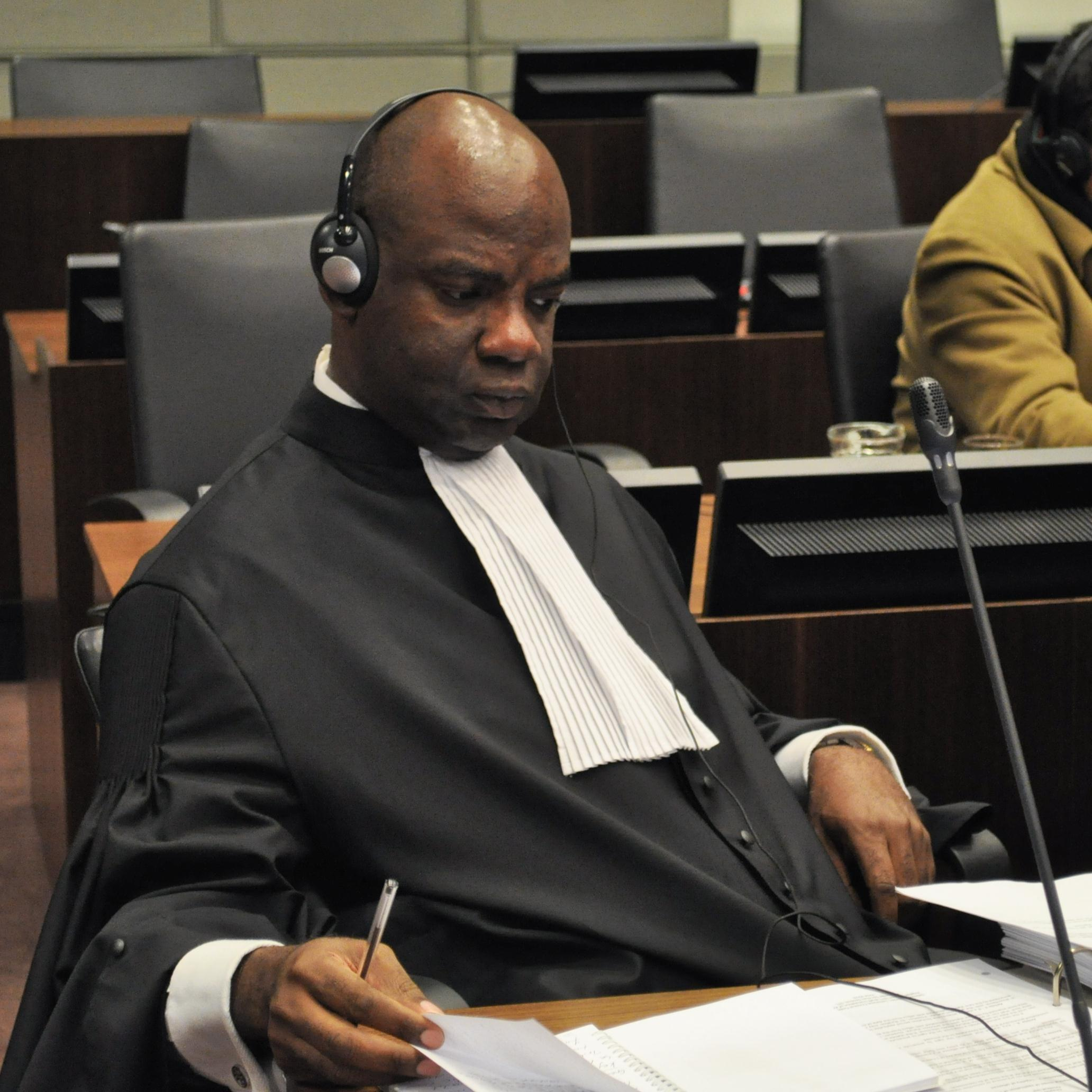
Charles A. Adeogun-Phillips during a UN court hearing

The joint genocide trial which he led between 2001 and 2002 of Dr. Gerard Ntakirutimana and his father, Pastor Elizaphan Ntakirutimana– the then leader of the Seventh Day Adventist Church who was transferred to the UN Court from the United States – was the subject of a book written by the American author, Philip Gourevitch, entitled We Wish to Inform You That Tomorrow We Will Be Killed with Our Families.

He also led the trial of serial rapist Mikaeli Muhimana, involving charges of sexual violence and cruelty against women, between 2004 and 2005. The Muhimana case clarified and developed the jurisprudence of the international criminal tribunals on the legal elements and definition of the crime of rape in the context of large scale and widespread international crimes.

Between 2006 and 2007, Charles led the high-profile genocide trial of Francois Karera, the former Governor of Kigali-Rural prefecture charged with directing and participating in the massacre of 5,000 (Five Thousand) Tutsi refugees gathered at the Ntarama Catholic Church on 15 April 1994 and of another 50,000 (Fifty Thousand) Tutsi civilians killed in the Nyamata area thereafter. The Ntarama church and the Nyamata massacre site have since become two of six genocide memorial sites in Rwanda.

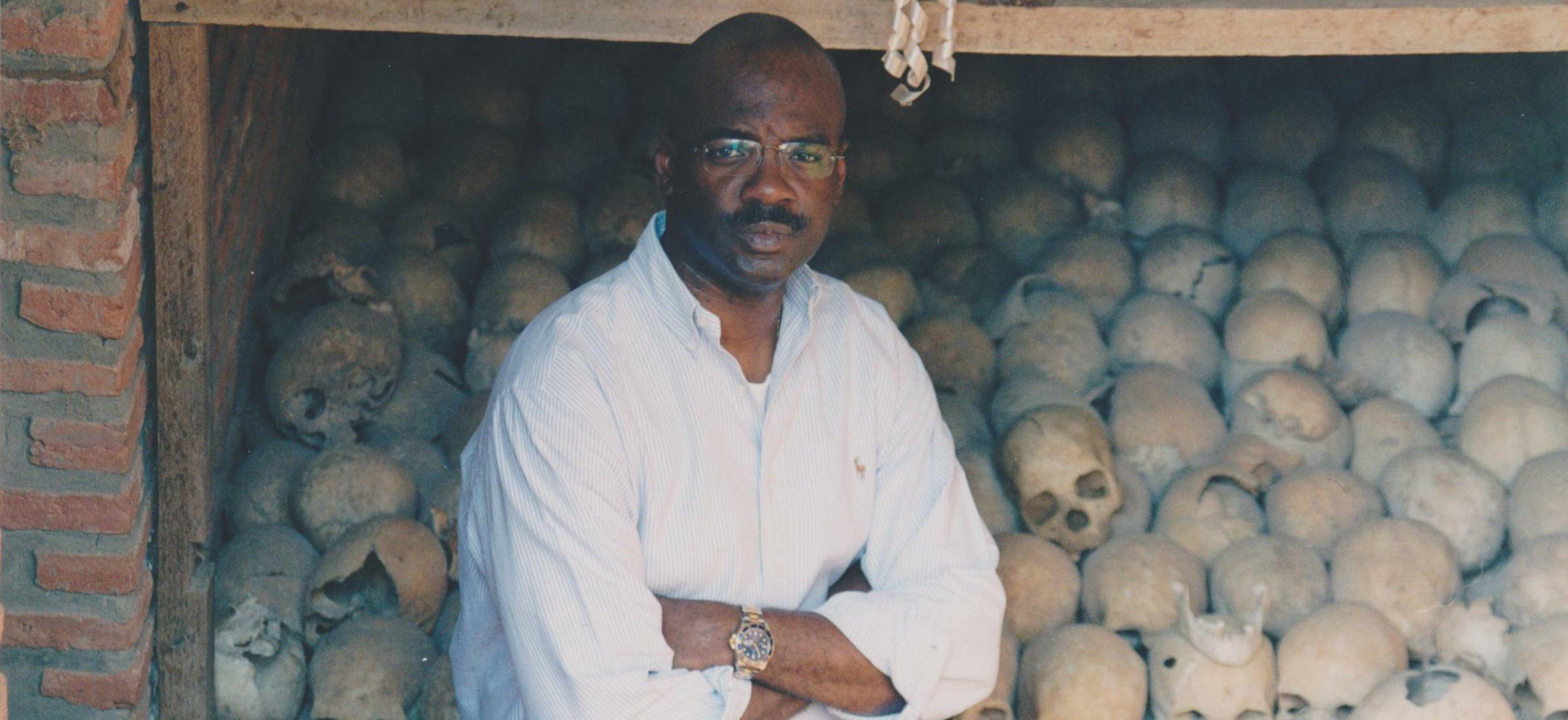
Charles A. Adeogun-Phillips working at the Ntarama church massacre site in Rwanda

Having led complex plea negotiations in the Vincent Rutaganira, Paul Bisengimana and Juvenal Rugambarara cases between 2004 and 2007 which resulted in guilty pleas to serious violations of international humanitarian law, Adeogun-Phillips is one of the few international prosecutors in the world who have contributed to the development and practice of guilty plea negotiations in the context of large-scale international crimes.

Charles also led a team of international prosecutors in the retrial of Lt. Col Tharcisse Muvunyi, between 17 June and 2 October 2009, on the charges of direct and public incitement to commit genocide. He had led the original trial in the case between 28 February 2005 and 23 June 2006 following which the defendant was convicted. However, on 29 August 2008, the Appeals Chamber reversed all the convictions against the defendant and ordered a retrial on the charge of direct and public incitement to commit genocide. The retrial in the Muvunyi case in 2009 was the first of its kind before any of the international criminal tribunals.

Other notable international genocide trials he led include that of the former Deputy-Governor, Dominique Ntawukulilyayo, in 2009 and that of the former Finance Minister, Emmanuel Ndindabahizi between 2003 and 2004. He was also prosecution counsel on the Ignace Bagilishema and Alfred Musema trials between 1999 and 2000.

As an international prosecutor, Charles prevailed in trials against some of the world's most reputed criminal defence lawyers including Ramsey Clarke-–the 66th Attorney-General of the United States (1967–69) and lawyer to controversial figures such as Slobodan Milošević, Radovan Karadžić and Saddam Hussein; Edward Medvene-–who represented Fred Goldman in the civil action against O. J. Simpson over the killing of his son, Ron Goldman; French lawyer, François Roux; and Steven Kay, QC, the court-appointed lawyer for former Serbian President Slobodan Milošević.

His publications include; contribution to International Criminal Investigations, Law and Practice -“The Challenges of International Investigations and Prosecutions: Perspectives of a Prosecutor" (2018 Eleven International Publishing, The Hague); contribution to International Criminal Law Issues: Contributions in pursuit of accountability for Africa and the World – "The Evolution and Practice of Guilty Pleas in International Criminal Law" (2022 T.M.C Asser Press, The Hague). Ensuring Justice in Libya (2011, Jurist, Pittsburgh University Law School); The concept of an International Anti-corruption Court: a Reality or a Pipe Dream? (2024, Counsel Magazine, published by LexisNexis UK).

His precedent setting genocide trials have been the subject of several books including, "Court of Remorse" by Thierry Cruvellier (Wisconsin Press 2010), "Guilty Pleas in International Criminal Law" by Nancy Amoury Combs (Stanford University Press 2007) and "Annotated Leading Cases of International Criminal Tribunals" by André Klip and Goran Sluiter (Intersentia 2005). He also appears in the UN documentary, "Towards Reconciliation"

== Honors and awards ==
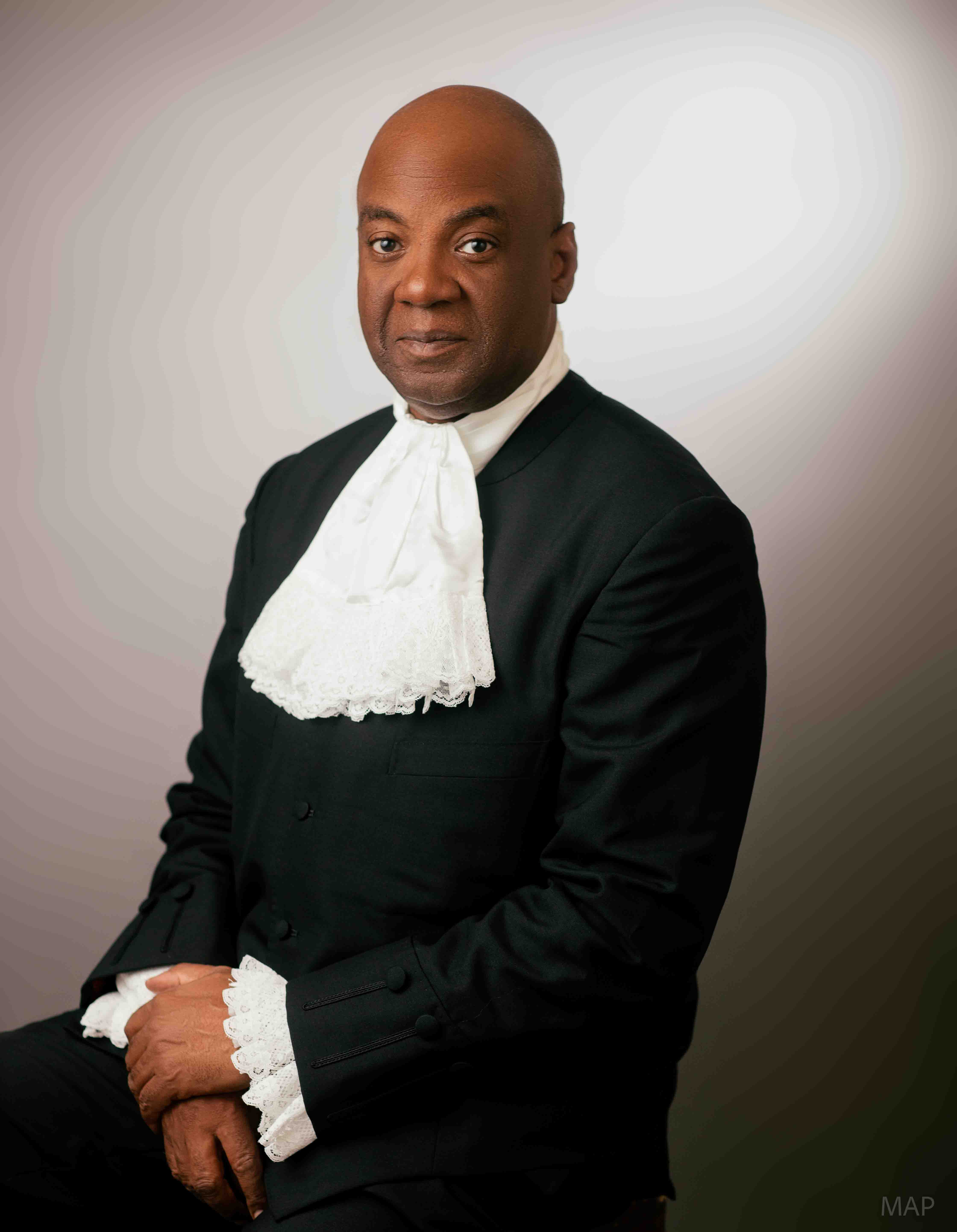
Dr. Charles Ayodeji Adeogun-Phillips, SAN

His unwavering dedication to fight against impunity in the aftermath of the 1994 Rwandan genocide, a tragedy that saw the massacre of over 800,000 Tutsi civilians at a rate surpassing four times that of the Nazi Holocaust, has placed him at the forefront of several pioneering developments in the field of international humanitarian and criminal law cumulating in his citation in the maiden edition of Creswell's "Who’s Who in Public International Law" in 2007 and in the International Year Book and Statesmen's Who's Who in 2011. He has served as the International Criminal Court Bar Association's focal point for Nigeria since 2018. In 2022, he was honored with an LL.D by the University of Warwick, in recognition of his contribution to the development of international criminal law.

== Regional and domestic legal career ==
Upon returning to private practice in June 2010, Charles practices at Guernica 37 (International law) Chambers in London. He is also lead counsel at Charles Anthony Lawyers in Nigeria. He specializes in the areas of public international law, international human rights law, international criminal law, international anti-corruption law, international civil service law and international climate change law. He has also acted on matters involving corruption, asset forfeiture, money laundering and fraud including tracing proceeds of fraud, international recognition of anti-money laundering protocols and jurisdictional issues.

His international criminal and humanitarian law advisory practice has included providing specialist advice to the Military High Command in Nigeria in connection with the preliminary examinations launched by the ICC into alleged crimes against humanity and/or war crimes committed in the context of armed conflict between "Boko Haram" and the Nigerian security forces. He also advises various African governments on ICC related transitional justice issues.

As part of his international human rights practice, between 2013 and 2014, he successfully represented Rev. Christopher Mtikila, the outspoken Tanzanian politician, in his watershed and precedent-setting case against the Tanzanian Government, before the African Court on Human and People's Rights (AfCHPR), wherein he successfully challenged the constitutional prohibition against independent candidature for election into public office, as a violation of the African Charter on Human and People's Rights. The Mtikila vs. Tanzania case was the first ever case to be heard by AfCHPR on the merits since its inception in 2004. It was also the first case to be decided by the Court in favour of the Applicant and the first case before the Court on the issue of reparations

Since 2017, Charles has been retained by the Asset Management Corporation of Nigeria (AMCON), to trace and recover over $14 billion Dollars, currently owed to the Government of the Federal Republic of Nigeria (FRN), following its acquisition in 2011, of non-performing loans from some of the country's ailing commercial banks.

In 2016, Charles was appointed by the Attorney General of the Federal Republic of Nigeria, to lead unprecedented investigations and trials of multiple high-ranking judicial officials in Nigeria, including a then-serving Justice of the Supreme Court of Nigeria, Sylvester Ngwuta, JSC (now deceased). However, facing unwarranted political interference and misuse of prosecutorial powers, Charles decided to step down from these cases in 2017.

Despite these challenges, Charles's dedication to eradicating corruption within Africa has not waned. He continues to champion for the efficient return of illicitly obtained public assets to the victim countries. Presently, he serves as the vice-chairman of the Board for Integrity Initiatives International (III), a Boston-based NGO. In this role, he actively supports the creation of an International Anti-Corruption Court, further emphasizing his commitment to global anti-corruption efforts.

In June 2010, following his distinguished UN career, Charles returned to private practice and founded Charles Anthony (Lawyers) LLP, a cross-border firm of legal practitioners in Lagos and London, with specialisation in international criminal and human rights law, complex white-collar crime, and international asset recovery matters. He is currently admitted to practice as list counsel before several international and regional courts including the International Criminal Court (ICC), the Special Tribunal for Lebanon (STL), the United Nations Residual Mechanism for International Tribunals (UNMIT) and the African Court on Human and People's Rights in Tanzania (AfCHPR). Since 2018, he has served as the International Criminal Court Bar Association's focal point for Nigeria.

In 2013, while representing the outspoken Tanzanian opposition politician, the late Rev Christopher Mtikila, in a landmark and precedent-setting case against the United Republic of Tanzania before the African Court on Human and Peoples' Rights, he successfully challenged the Tanzanian constitutional prohibition against independent candidature for election into public office as a violation of the African Charter on Human and People's Rights. The Mtikila vs. Tanzania case was the first case to be heard by the said Court on its merits since its inception in 2004. It was also the first case to be decided by the Court in favour of the Applicant and the first case before the Court on the issue of reparations.

His advisory practice in international criminal and humanitarian law has included providing specialist advice to the Military High Command in Nigeria in connection with the preliminary examinations launched by the ICC into alleged crimes against humanity and/or war crimes committed in the context of armed conflict between "Boko Haram" and the Nigerian security forces. He also advises various African governments on ICC-related transitional justice issues.

He has acted on matters involving corruption, asset forfeiture, money laundering and fraud (including tracing the proceeds of fraud), international recognition of anti-money laundering protocols and jurisdictional issues.

== Precedent Setting Genocide Trials Led by Dr. Charles Adeogun-Phillips SAN at the United Nations International Criminal Tribunal for Rwanda (ICTR) ==
S/N	Case	Category	Case No	Role	Trial Dates	Charges	Status	Sentence	Appeal
1.	Prosecutor vs. Dominique Ntawukulilyayo	Sous-Préfet (Deputy Governor) Gisaraga Sub-Préfecture, Butare	ICTR-05-82	Lead Prosecutor	6 May 2009 – 14 June 2010	Genocide; Direct and Public Incitement to Commit Genocide; Rape and other Inhumane Acts as Crimes against Humanity.	Convicted 3 August 2010	25	Conviction upheld but Sentence reduced to 20 years on 14 December 2011
2.	Prosecutor vs. Lt. Col Tharcisse Muvunyi (Re-Trial)	Military Commander, ESO Butare Préfecture	ICTR-00-55A-R	Lead Prosecutor	17 June 2009 – 17 Sept 2010	Direct and Public Incitement to Commit Genocide (Re-trial)	Convicted 11 February 2010	15	Convictions and Sentence Upheld on 1 April 2011
3.	Prosecutor vs. Juvenal Rugambarara	Bourgmestre (Mayor), Bicumbi Commune, Kigali-Rural Préfecture	ICTR-00-59T	Lead Prosecutor	15 August 2003 – 13 July 2007	Genocide, Conspiracy to Commit Genocide, Direct and Public Incitement to Commit Genocide; Extermination, Murder, and Torture as Crimes against Humanity; War Crimes.	Convicted on 16 November 2007, following a Guilty Plea to Extermination	11	N/A
4.	Prosecutor vs. Francois Karera	Préfet (Governor) of Kigali-Rural Préfecture	ICTR-01-74	Lead Prosecutor	9 Jan 2006 – 1 June 2007	Genocide; Extermination and Murder as Crimes against Humanity; War Crimes.	Convicted 7 December 2007	Life	Convictions and Sentence Upheld on 2 February 2009.
5.	Prosecutor vs. Lt. Col Tharcisse Muvunyi	Military Commander, ESO Butare Préfecture	ICTR-00-55A-T	Lead Prosecutor	28 Feb 2005 – 23 June 2006	Genocide; Direct and Public incitement to commit genocide; Rape, and Other Inhumane Acts as Crimes against Humanity.	Convicted 12 September 2006	25	Convictions quashed & retrial ordered on 29 August 2008
6.	Prosecutor vs. Paul Bisengimana	Bourgmestre (Mayor) Gikoro commune Secteur, Kigali-Rural Préfecture	ICTR-00-60	Lead Prosecutor	18 March 2002 – 7 December 2005	Genocide, Murder, Extermination, and Rape as Crimes against Humanity.	Convicted on 13 April 2006 following a Guilty Plea to Murder & Extermination	15	N/A
7.	Prosecutor vs. Vincent Rutaganira	Conseiller de secteur Mubuga, Kibuye Préfecture	ICTR-95-1C	Lead Prosecutor	12 March 2002 – 8 Dec 2004	Genocide; Murder, and Extermination as Crimes against Humanity; War crimes.	Convicted on 14 March 2005 following a Guilty Plea to Extermination	6	N/A
8.	Prosecutor vs. Mika Muhimana	Conseiller de secteur, Gishyita, Kibuye Préfecture	ICTR-95-1B	Lead Prosecutor	29 March 2004 – 20 Jan 2005	Genocide; Murder and Rape as Crimes against Humanity.	Convicted 28 April 2005	Life	Convictions and Sentence Upheld on 27 May 2007
9.	Prosecutor vs. Emmanuel Ndindabahizi	Minister of Finance	ICTR-01-71	Lead Prosecutor	1 Sept 2003 – 2 March 2004	Genocide; Extermination, and Murder as Crimes against Humanity.	Convicted 15 July 2004	Life	Convictions and Sentence Upheld on 16 January 2007
10.	Prosecutor vs. Pastor Elizaphan Ntakirutimana	Clergy, Seventh Day Adventist Church, Kibuye Préfecture	ICTR-96-10	Lead Prosecutor	18 Sept 2001 – 22 Aug 2002	Genocide; Extermination, and Murder as Crimes against Humanity	Convicted 21 February 2003	10	Convictions and Sentence Upheld on 13 December 2004
11.	Prosecutor vs. Dr. Gerard Ntakirutimana	Physician, Seventh Day Adventist Hospital, Kibuye Préfecture	ICTR-96-10	Lead Prosecutor	18 Sept 2001 – 22 Aug 2002	Genocide; Extermination, and Murder as Crimes against Humanity	Convicted 21 February 2003	25	Convictions and Sentence Upheld on 13 December 2004
12.	Prosecutor vs. Mr. Ignace Bagilishema	Bourgmestre (Mayor) of Mabanza Commune, Kibuye Préfecture	ICTR-96-01A	Prosecutor	27 Oct 1999 – 19 Oct 2000	Genocide; Conspiracy to Commit Genocide; Extermination, and Murder as Crimes against Humanity	Acquitted 7 June 2001	N/A	Acquittal Upheld on 3 July 2002
13.	Prosecutor vs. Alfred Musema	Director, Gisovu Tea Factory, Kibuye Préfecture	ICTR-96-13	Prosecutor	25 Jan – 28 June 1999	Genocide; Conspiracy to Commit Genocide; Extermination, and Murder as Crimes against Humanity	Convicted 27 January 2000	Life	Convictions and Sentence Upheld 16 November 2001
