= List of World Heritage Sites in Rwanda =

Location of World Heritage Sites in Rwanda. Blue dots indicate the sites connected to the Rwandan genocide.

The United Nations Educational, Scientific and Cultural Organization (UNESCO) World Heritage Sites are places of importance to cultural or natural heritage as described in the UNESCO World Heritage Convention, established in 1972. Cultural heritage consists of monuments (such as architectural works, monumental sculptures, or inscriptions), groups of buildings, and sites (including archaeological sites). Natural features (consisting of physical and biological formations), geological and physiographical formations (including habitats of threatened species of animals and plants), and natural sites which are important from the point of view of science, conservation, or natural beauty, are defined as natural heritage. Rwanda accepted the convention on 28 December 2000, making its sites eligible for inclusion on the list. There are two World Heritage Sites in Rwanda, both of them were listed in 2023. There are no sites on the country's tentative list.

== World Heritage Sites ==
UNESCO lists sites under ten criteria; each entry must meet at least one of the criteria. Criteria i through vi are cultural, and vii through x are natural.

World Heritage Sites
Site	Image	Location (province)	Year listed	UNESCO data	Description
Memorial sites of the Genocide: Nyamata, Murambi, Gisozi and Bisesero	Monument to the genocide with spears pointing up	Eastern, Kigali, Southern, Western	2023	1586; vi (cultural)	The serial property comprises the sites commemorating the Rwandan genocide, where between April and July 1994 an estimated one million people, belonging to the Tutsi minority ethnic group, as well as some moderate Hutu and Twa, were killed by armed Hutu militias. These sites are the Bisesero Genocide Memorial Centre (monument pictured), Murambi Genocide Memorial Centre, Nyamata Genocide Memorial Centre, and the Kigali Genocide Memorial.
Nyungwe National Park	Tropical scenery with trees and mountains in the background	Southern, Western	2023	1697; x (natural)	This site comprises three protected areas with rainforests, peat bogs, moorlands, and grasslands. The area is home to the eastern chimpanzee, golden monkey, and Hills' horseshoe bat. The park is also important for bird conservation.

== Tentative list ==
In addition to sites inscribed on the World Heritage List, member states can maintain a list of tentative sites that they may consider for nomination. Nominations for the World Heritage List are only accepted if the site was previously listed on the tentative list. Rwanda does not maintain any properties on its tentative list.
