= Cyanika Genocide Memorial =

- New building of the Cyanika Genocide Memorial, constructed in 2012, August 2025
- Interactive map of Cyanika Genocide Memorial
- Location: Cyanika, Nyamagabe District, Southern Province, Rwanda
- Coordinates: 2°26′27.75″S 29°36′11.81″E
- Type: Genocide memorial
- Dedicated to: 1994 genocide against the Tutsi
- Use: Ibuka

The Cyanika Genocide Memorial is a memorial site located in Cyanika, Nyamagabe District, Southern Province, Rwanda. It commemorates the victims of the 1994 genocide against the Tutsi, including Tutsi killed at Cyanika Catholic Parish in April 1994, and serves as a burial site and a place of remembrance and commemoration.

== Location ==

Some memorials of the 1994 Genocide against the Tutsi in Rwanda.

=== Context ===
The site forms part of the network of memorial sites dedicated to victims of the genocide against the Tutsi throughout Rwanda. These sites preserve burial places, physical remains and memories associated with the genocide and are used for remembrance and commemoration.

Four genocide memorial sites in Rwanda are inscribed as a serial World Heritage Site by UNESCO: Nyamata, Murambi, Gisozi and Bisesero.

=== Setting ===
The memorial is located in Cyanika, in Nyamagabe District, in southern Rwanda. It was constructed near Cyanika Catholic Parish, where large numbers of Tutsi sought refuge and were killed during the genocide.

The memorial is located near Murambi, another major massacre site in Nyamagabe District. Some Tutsi who survived the massacre at Murambi fled towards Cyanika Parish, where they were subsequently attacked.

Interior of the Cyanika Genocide Memorial, with chambers containing victims' remains; August 2025.

The memorial was inaugurated in 2012 by Jeannette Kagame and serves as a place of burial, remembrance and commemoration for victims killed in the Cyanika area.

Research by Julia Viebach at Rwanda's genocide memorials, including Cyanika, has examined how the preservation of victims' remains connects survivors and bereaved relatives with those who were killed.

== History ==
Site of one of the pits into which victims' bodies were pushed by bulldozer. The remains were later transferred to the memorial building; photograph taken in August 2025.

During the genocide, Cyanika Catholic Parish became a place of refuge for Tutsi from the surrounding area and for some survivors of the massacre at Murambi. On the morning of 21 April 1994, soldiers, local officials, politicians and militia members attacked the people gathered at the parish.

Research conducted by Laura Major documented the exhumation, handling and collective reburial of human remains at Cyanika during the creation of the memorial.

African Rights reported that the majority of approximately 25,000 victims whose remains were reburied at the Cyanika memorial on 26 February 2012 had been killed at the parish on 21 April 1994. Their remains had previously been buried in three mass graves near the parish. The New Times reported before the reburial that more than 30,000 victims killed at Cyanika Parish were expected to be transferred to the new memorial site.

In October 2019, 104 victims whose remains had been discovered at Cyanika Catholic Parish were given a formal burial at the memorial. During the ceremony, Minister of Justice Johnston Busingye called for information about the locations of genocide victims to be disclosed so that their remains could be recovered and buried.

In April 2022, nine additional victims were buried at the memorial during the 28th commemoration of the genocide against the Tutsi. The Ministry of National Unity and Civic Engagement stated at the time that the memorial contained the remains of more than 35,000 victims.

On 4 May 2025, 53 additional victims were laid to rest at the Cyanika Genocide Memorial during a commemoration attended by President of the Senate François Xavier Kalinda. The Parliament of Rwanda described the site at that time as the burial place of more than 40,000 Tutsi victims of the genocide.

== Features ==
The Cyanika Genocide Memorial was established as a collective burial and remembrance site. Human remains recovered from mass graves around Cyanika Parish were transferred to the memorial during its construction and subsequent reburial ceremonies.

The memorial contains chambers in which victims' remains are preserved. Julia Viebach examined the care of human remains at memorial sites and their role in maintaining connections between survivors, bereaved relatives and those who were killed.

The memorial is also used for annual remembrance ceremonies. Survivors, victims' families, local residents and public officials gather at the site to honour those killed and commemorate the history of the genocide in the Cyanika area.

== See also ==
- Rwandan genocide
- List of Rwandan genocide memorials
- Cyanika
- Nyamagabe District
- Murambi Genocide Memorial Centre
- Kigali Genocide Memorial
