= Kaduha Genocide Memorial =

- The Kaduha Genocide Memorial, August 2025
- Interactive map of Kaduha Genocide Memorial
- Location: Bamba, Kavumu Cell, Kaduha Sector, Nyamagabe District, Southern Province, Rwanda
- Coordinates: 2.335637°S 29.522778°E
- Type: Genocide memorial
- Opening date: July 2001
- Dedicated to: 1994 genocide against the Tutsi

The Kaduha Genocide Memorial is a memorial site and burial ground for victims of the 1994 genocide against the Tutsi. It is located at Kaduha, in Nyamagabe District, in the Southern Province of Rwanda. In 1994, Kaduha was part of Gikongoro Prefecture.

The main massacre took place at the Kaduha parish on 21 April 1994. The memorial holds the remains of more than 47,000 victims. President Paul Kagame opened it in July 2001.

== Location ==
The memorial is in Bamba village, Kavumu Cell, Kaduha Sector, Nyamagabe District. It stands close to the Catholic parish, a school and a health centre. The area has steep hills and deep valleys.

== History ==
The burial ground, August 2025

In April 1994, thousands of Tutsi took refuge at the Kaduha parish. They hid in the church, the school and the health centre. Kaduha was one of several massacre sites in Gikongoro. The other main sites included Murambi, Cyanika and Kibeho.

The attack began at dawn on 21 April 1994. The killers used grenades, guns and traditional weapons. They attacked the church, the parish buildings, the school and the health centre. Before the attack, refugees had dug trenches. The trenches were presented as latrines. After the massacre, they were used as mass graves.

A 1996 study by the Rwandan Ministry of Higher Education found that more than 20,000 people died at the Kaduha parish.

In 2022, a court in Paris tried Laurent Bucyibaruta. He was the prefect of Gikongoro in 1994. The court found him guilty of complicity in genocide. The verdict covered the massacres at Murambi, Cyanika and Kaduha. He received a sentence of 20 years in prison.

== Memorial ==
The people of the district built the memorial with their own contributions. President Paul Kagame officially opened it in July 2001. In his speech, he asked Rwandans to remember the genocide so that it never happens again.

According to the memorial records, 47,311 victims were buried there by 2013. Remains are still added when new bodies are found. A commemoration is held each year. Survivors say it should take place on 21 April. The exact date is set by local authorities.

The school, church and health centre near the memorial, August 2025

Sister Milgitha Kösser was a German nun. She ran the Kaduha health centre from 1973. She witnessed the massacre. She kept an album of 193 photographs taken between 1992 and 1995. The album documents the destruction at Kaduha. Historians use it to study the genocide at Kaduha.

== See also ==
- Rwandan genocide
- List of Rwandan genocide memorials
- Nyamagabe District
- Murambi Genocide Memorial Centre
- Cyanika Genocide Memorial
