= Ministry of National Unity and Civic Engagement =

Government ministry of Rwanda

- Headquarters of MINUBUMWE in Kigali

Ministry overview
- Formed: 14 July 2021; 5 years ago
- Preceding agencies: National Unity and Reconciliation Commission; National Commission for the Fight against Genocide; National Itorero Commission; Genocide Survivors Assistance Fund (FARG)
- Jurisdiction: Government of Rwanda
- Headquarters: KG 7 Ave, Gasabo District, Kigali
- Minister responsible: Jean-Damascène Bizimana, Minister of National Unity and Civic Engagement
- Ministry executive: Eric U. Mahoro, Permanent Secretary
- Website: www.minubumwe.gov.rw

The Ministry of National Unity and Civic Engagement (MINUBUMWE) is a ministry of the Government of Rwanda. It was created in 2021.

MINUBUMWE promotes the unity of Rwandans. It also preserves the history and memory of the genocide against the Tutsi. It is also in charge of civic education and culture. Four former public institutions were merged into this ministry.

== History ==
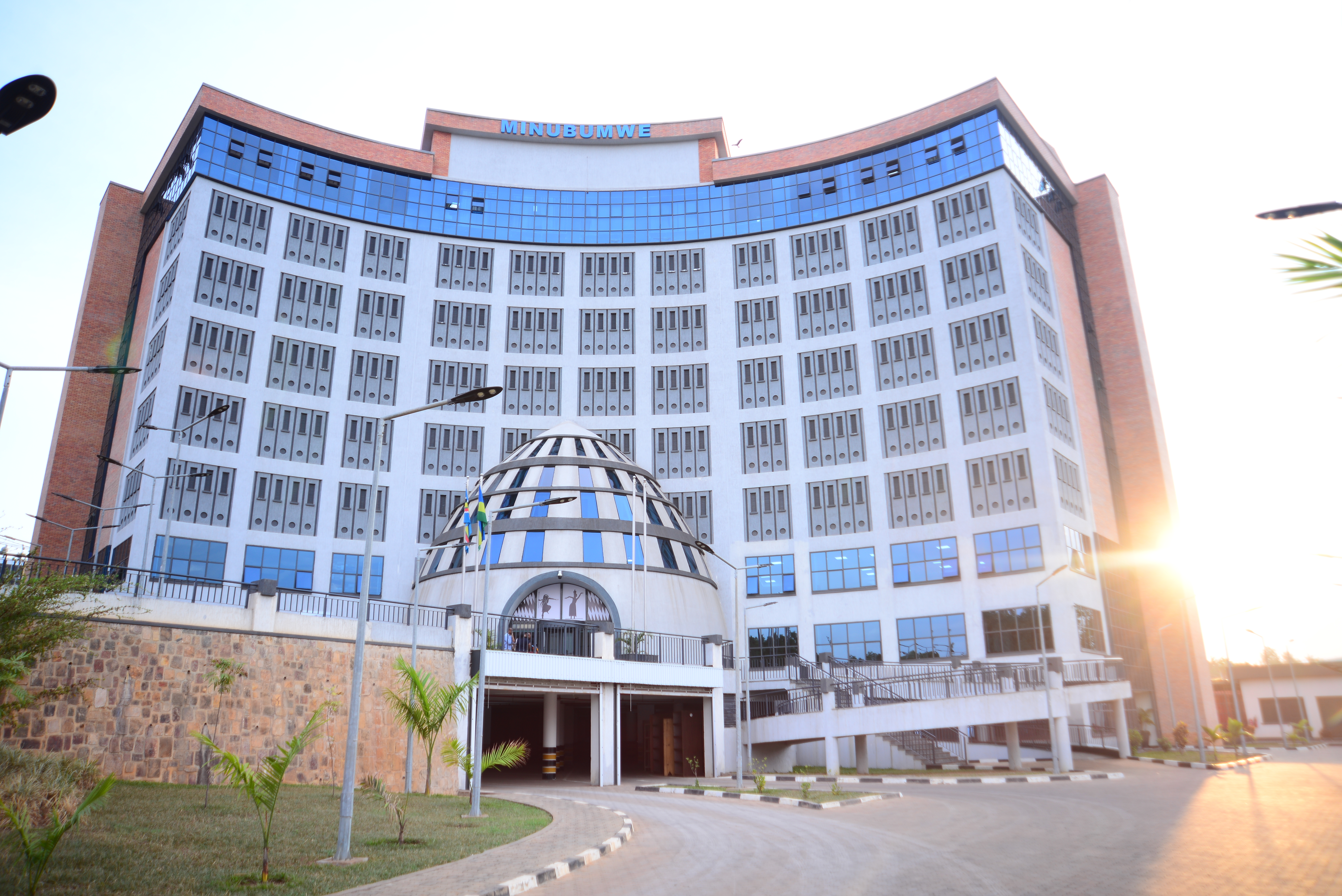
Front of the MINUBUMWE building (2024)

On 14 July 2021, the Cabinet met under the chairmanship of President Paul Kagame. It approved the creation of MINUBUMWE.

On 21 September 2021, the Cabinet approved the abolition of four public institutions. Their responsibilities were transferred to MINUBUMWE. These institutions were:

- the National Unity and Reconciliation Commission (NURC);
- the National Commission for the Fight against Genocide (CNLG);
- the National Itorero Commission;
- the Genocide Survivors Assistance Fund (FARG).

Prime Minister's Order n° 021/03 of 21 October 2021 sets out the mission and structure of MINUBUMWE.

On 31 August 2021, Jean-Damascène Bizimana was appointed to lead the ministry. Before that, he was Executive Secretary of the National Commission for the Fight against Genocide. In April 2026, he was still the minister.

== Mandate ==
MINUBUMWE has three aims. The first is to preserve historical memory. The second is to strengthen the unity of Rwandans. The third is to promote civic education and culture.

The main responsibilities of MINUBUMWE are:

- implementing policies on Rwandan history, national unity, civic engagement and culture;
- preventing genocide and fighting genocide ideology;
- fighting genocide denial and revisionism of the genocide against the Tutsi;
- supporting the recovery and welfare of genocide survivors;
- maintaining the memorial sites of the genocide against the Tutsi;
- preserving evidence of the genocide, including the records of the Gacaca courts;
- planning and coordinating the commemoration (Kwibuka) of the genocide against the Tutsi;
- promoting unity and peace through education and community dialogue.

== Structure ==
MINUBUMWE has four departments:

- National Unity and Community Resilience;
- Itorero and Culture;
- Research and Policy Development;
- Memory and Genocide Prevention.

The headquarters of MINUBUMWE are on KG 7 Ave, in Kigali. The Permanent Secretary is Eric U. Mahoro.

== Ministers ==
- Jean-Damascène Bizimana (since August 2021)

== See also ==
- National Commission for the Fight against Genocide
- Rwandan genocide
- Cabinet of Rwanda
