= Kabgayi Genocide Memorial =

Rwandan genocide memorial

- The Kabgayi Genocide Memorial, August 2025
- Interactive map of Kabgayi Genocide Memorial
- Location: Kabgayi, Muhanga District, Southern Province, Rwanda
- Coordinates: 2.106625°S 29.751415°E
- Type: Genocide memorial
- Dedicated to: 1994 genocide against the Tutsi

The Kabgayi Genocide Memorial is a memorial site and burial ground for victims of the 1994 genocide against the Tutsi. It is located in Kabgayi, in Muhanga District, Southern Province, Rwanda.

The memorial honours the many Tutsi who sought refuge in Kabgayi during the genocide. Many of them were killed there, or taken away and killed elsewhere.

== Location ==
Visitor area above the memorial, August 2025

The memorial is on Kabgayi hill, south of the town of Muhanga, formerly called Gitarama. It is near the Kabgayi Cathedral, Kabgayi Hospital and several schools of the Catholic Church.

== History ==
=== Refuge at Kabgayi ===
During the genocide, Kabgayi became a refuge for thousands of Tutsi. They came from the communes of Gitarama Prefecture, especially Mushubati, Tambwe, Ntongwe, Mugina, Taba and Buringa. Others had fled the killings in Kigali. They sheltered in the primary school, the Petit Séminaire of Kabgayi, Saint-Joseph secondary school and the CND convent. They hoped that church land would protect them, as it had in 1959.

From 15 April 1994, Father Vjeko Ćurić, a Franciscan priest, drove refugees from Kivumu to Kabgayi. He paid bribes to the Interahamwe at roadblocks. In May 1994, Human Rights Watch estimated that about 50,000 displaced people were in Kabgayi, most of them Tutsi. The government of the time refused to recognise the neutrality of Kabgayi Hospital.

=== Killings ===
Life for the refugees in Kabgayi was very hard. Killers attacked the site often and chose people to kill. Anyone who tried to leave could be caught and killed by the Interahamwe. Many Tutsi, especially men and boys, were gathered and put on ONATRACOM buses. They were taken to Ngororero and killed there. Human Rights Watch also reported that groups of people were taken from the Tutsi refugee camp at the church centre in Kabgayi and killed. Survivors also say that women and girls were raped, and that men were taken to unknown places and killed.

On 2 June 1994, at about 9 a.m., the Rwandan Patriotic Front took Kabgayi and rescued the refugees who were still there.

== Features ==
Graves below the memorial, August 2025

The memorial lies below the hill of Kabgayi Cathedral, near the hospital. Like other memorials in Rwanda, it hosts the annual Kwibuka commemoration ceremonies required by law.

== See also ==
- Rwandan genocide
- List of Rwandan genocide memorials
- Kabgayi
- Muhanga District
- Cyarwa Genocide Memorial
- Murambi Genocide Memorial Centre
