= List of massacres in Rwanda =

This is a list of massacres that have occurred in Rwanda in chronological order.

== List of massacres ==
Name	Date	Deaths	Involved	Location – Circumstances
Bugesera invasion also known as the Bloody Christmas	December 21-27 1963	10,000-20,000		Various locations – Reprisals for attack by exiled Tutsis 5% of Tutsis in Rwanda killed
1991 Bagogwe massacre	January-March 1991	300	Hutu	Northwest Rwanda – Reprisal for RPF offensive
Bugesera massacres	March 1992	300+	Hutu	Bugesera District – Disinformation on Radio Rwanda
Assassination of Juvénal Habyarimana and Cyprien Ntaryamira	6 April 1994	12	Tutsi rebel Rwandan Patriotic Front (RPF) or government-aligned Hutu Power followers (disputed)	Kigali – 12 people, including Rwandan President Juvénal Habyarimana and Burundian President Cyprien Ntaryamira were killed when their airplane was shot down. The shootdown was the catalyst for the Rwandan genocide
Rwandan genocide	7 April – 15 July 1994	500,000–1,000,000	Hutu-led government (led by Théoneste Bagosora); Interahamwe (led by Robert Kajuga); Impuzamugambi (led by Jean-Bosco Barayagwiza and Hassan Ngeze); Other militias and gangs financed by Félicien Kabuga; local Hutu extremists	Various locations – 70% of Tutsis exterminated, 30% of Twa killed
Musha Church massacre	13 April 1994	1,180-1,200	Interahamwe (Hutu paramilitary organization)	Rutoma sector, Gikoro commune, Kigali – Part of the Rwandan genocide
Murambi Technical School massacre	April 18 – 21, 1994	5,000–20,000	Interahamwe (Hutu paramilitary organization)	Murambi Technical School – Part of the Rwandan genocide.
Ntarama Massacre	15 April 1994	5,000	Police, soldiers, interahamwe and local volunteers	Ntarama church, Ntarama – Part of the Rwandan genocide.
Nyarubuye massacre	April 15-16, 1994	20,000	Interahamwe (Hutu paramilitary organization)	Kibungo Province – Part of the Rwandan genocide.
Kibeho Massacre	April 22, 1995	4000+	Rwandan Patriotic Army	Near Kibeho – Rwandan government estimated death toll at 330
Gikondo massacre	April 9, 1994	110	Interahamwe militia under supervision of the Hutu presidential guard	Gikondo, Kigali – part of the Rwandan genocide.
Nyakimana cave massacre	October 23-October 28,1997	5,000-8,000	RPF	Gisenyi Province – RPF bombing of alleged Hutu displaced persons
Mudende camp massacre	December 10, 1997	231-300	Hutu	Northwest Rwanda – Hutu guerilla attack on Tutsi refugee camp

== See also ==
- Attacks on humanitarian workers
