= Cyarwa Genocide Memorial =

- The Cyarwa Genocide Memorial
- Interactive map of Cyarwa Genocide Memorial
- Location: Tumba Sector, Huye District, Southern Province, Rwanda
- Coordinates: 2.625133°S 29.750079°E
- Type: Genocide memorial
- Dedicated to: 1994 genocide against the Tutsi

The Cyarwa Genocide Memorial is a memorial site and burial ground for victims of the 1994 genocide against the Tutsi. It is located in Tumba Sector, Huye District, in the Southern Province of Rwanda.

The memorial holds the remains of more than 11,000 victims of the genocide.

== Location ==
The Cyarwa Genocide Memorial

The memorial is in Tumba Sector, in Huye District. It lies near the city of Huye, formerly called Butare.

== History ==
The Cyarwa memorial is one of the commemoration sites linked to the genocide in the former Butare Prefecture. Many massacres took place in this prefecture in 1994.

The 28th commemoration was held at Cyarwa on 21 April 2022. At this event, witnesses said that the killings in the area began after a speech by the interim president Théodore Sindikubwabo. He gave this speech in Butare on 19 April 1994 and urged people to kill. The Minister of Health, Daniel Ngamije, described Sindikubwabo as a doctor who chose to become a killer.

== Features ==
Graves at the Cyarwa Genocide Memorial

The Cyarwa memorial holds the remains of more than 11,000 victims of the genocide.

On 15 May 2021, the remains of 48 victims were reburied with dignity at the memorial. Forty-seven of them had been found in Akamuhoza village between 26 and 28 April 2021. One had been brought from Ngoma Sector. The ceremony was attended by the Vice-President of the Senate, Espérance Nyirasafari, and by Théodate Siboyintore, president of Ibuka in Huye District.

== See also ==
- Rwandan genocide
- List of Rwandan genocide memorials
- Huye District
- Butare
- Cyanika Genocide Memorial
- Murambi Genocide Memorial Centre
