= List of Rwandan genocide memorials =

This is a non-exhaustive list of memorial sites associated with the 1994 Rwandan genocide. It includes memorials, monuments, stelae, plaques, gardens and other public places of remembrance. It does not include individual graves or private tributes.

== List of memorial sites ==
#	Site	Type	Country	Province / region	District / city / location	Images	Area	Establishment date / key dates	Speciality
01	Bazize Genocide Memorial (Hanika)	Memorial	Rwanda	Western	Rusizi	Other images	< 1 ha		
02	Birogo Genocide Memorial	Memorial	Rwanda	Western	Rusizi	Other images	< 1 ha		
03	Cyabakamyi Genocide Memorial	Memorial	Rwanda	Southern	Nyanza; Cyabakamyi, Nyabinyenga	Other images	< 1 ha		Located in Cyabakamyi sector, Nyanza District.
04	Rubengera Genocide Memorial	Memorial	Rwanda	Western	Karongi	Other images	0.2 ha.		
05	Rubona Genocide Memorial	Memorial	Rwanda	Southern	Huye	Other images	0.1 ha.		
06	Cyarwa Genocide Memorial	Memorial	Rwanda	Southern	Huye	Other images	0.2 ha.		
07	Bisesero Genocide Memorial Centre^{*}	Memorial	Rwanda	Western	Karongi	Other images	106 ha.	7 April: annual commemoration of the beginning of the genocide.	Associated with the resistance of Tutsi at Bisesero.
08	Murambi Genocide Memorial Centre^{*}	Memorial	Rwanda	Southern	Nyamagabe	Other images	95 ha.		The site was associated with Opération Turquoise.
09	Nyanza-Kicukiro Genocide Memorial	Memorial	Rwanda	Kigali	Kicukiro	Other images	5 ha.	11 April 1994.	The site is closely associated with the withdrawal of UNAMIR peacekeepers from the École technique officielle and the subsequent massacre of at least 2,000 Tutsi.
10	Nyanza Garden of Memory	Garden	Rwanda	Kigali	Kicukiro	Other images	100 ha.		
11	Belgian peacekeepers memorial site	Memorial	Rwanda	Kigali	Nyarugenge	Other images	1,400 m^{2} (0.35 acres)		Memorial to the Belgian peacekeepers killed at Camp Kigali.
12	Bigogwe	Memorial	Rwanda	Western	Nyabihu	Other images	0.74 ha		The expansion of the memorial was completed in 2025.
13	Cyanika	Memorial	Rwanda	Southern	Nyamagabe	Other images		Opened in 2012.	The memorial was officially opened by the First Lady of Rwanda.
14	Gahanga	Memorial	Rwanda	Kigali	Kicukiro	Other images			Genocide memorial in Gahanga.
15	Gashirabwoba	Memorial	Rwanda	Western	Nyamasheke	Other images			Associated with the reburial of genocide victims in Nyamasheke.
16	Gashora Genocide Memorial	Memorial	Rwanda	Eastern	Bugesera; Gashora, Biryogo	Other images		11 April: burial and commemoration ceremonies.	The memorial contained 5,281 victims after the burial of 52 newly recovered remains in 2026. The site is associated with massacres committed in the Gashora area of Bugesera.
17	Giheke Genocide Memorial	Memorial	Rwanda	Western	Rusizi	Other images			
18	Kabuye Genocide Memorial	Memorial	Rwanda	Southern	Gisagara; Ndora, Kabuye	Other images			More than 50,000 victims are associated with the memorial. The memorial is located in Ndora sector, Gisagara District.
19	Kaduha	Memorial	Rwanda	Southern	Nyamagabe	Other images		Inaugurated in 2001.	The genocide memorial at Kaduha was inaugurated in July 2001.
20	Kamembe Genocide Memorial	Memorial	Rwanda	Western	Rusizi	Other images			
21	Karama Genocide Memorial	Memorial	Rwanda	Southern	Huye	Other images			
22	Kayonza-Mukarange Genocide Memorial	Memorial	Rwanda	Eastern	Kayonza	Other images			
23	Kibeho	Memorial	Rwanda	Southern	Nyaruguru	Other images			The church at Kibeho has been discussed as both a religious site and a place of genocide remembrance.
24	Kibilizi Genocide Memorial	Memorial	Rwanda	Southern	Gisagara	Other images			
25	Kibungo-Ngoma Genocide Memorial	Memorial	Rwanda	Eastern	Ngoma; Kibungo	Other images		14 April: commemoration of the Kibungo massacres.	More than 25,000 victims are buried at the memorial. The site occupies the location of the former Kibungo prefecture.
26	Kibuye Genocide Memorial (Home St-Jean)	Memorial	Rwanda	Western	Karongi	Other images			
27	Kibuye (Gatwaro)	Memorial	Rwanda	Western	Karongi	Other images			Associated with massacres committed in Kibuye during the genocide.
28	Kibuye Genocide Memorial (St-Pierre)	Memorial	Rwanda	Western	Karongi	Other images			Associated with the genocide sites of Kibuye.
29	Kigali Genocide Memorial (Gisozi)^{*}	Memorial	Rwanda	Kigali	Gasabo				One of the four components of the UNESCO World Heritage property Memorial sites of the Genocide: Nyamata, Murambi, Gisozi and Bisesero.
30	Kiziguro Genocide Memorial	Memorial	Rwanda	Eastern	Gatsibo	Other images			
31	Mayunzwe Genocide Memorial	Memorial	Rwanda	Southern	Ruhango	Other images	0.6 ha	23–24 April 1994: arrival of Interahamwe and beginning of massacres.	The memorial is closely associated with the site known as Karuvariyo ("Calvary"), where many of the victims of Mayunzwe were killed on 24 April 1994. Local estimates indicate more than 850 victims in Mayunzwe sector.
32	Ngoma-Mugonero	Memorial	Rwanda	Western	Nyamasheke	Other images			Until 2009, it was the only memorial in Rwanda that explicitly identified the Tutsi victims of the 1994 genocide.
33	Musanze	Memorial	Rwanda	Northern	Musanze	Other images			The memorial was inaugurated in Musanze.
34	Mvuzo	Memorial	Rwanda	Northern	Rulindo				Also documented by the Genocide Archive of Rwanda as Shyorongi Memorial.
35	Ngororero	Memorial	Rwanda	Western	Ngororero				Plans to modernise the memorial were reported in 2009.
36	Ntarama	Memorial	Rwanda	Eastern	Bugesera	Other images			The memorial preserves a former church used as a massacre site during the genocide.
37	Nyamasheke	Memorial	Rwanda	Western	Nyamasheke	Other images		2019: reburial ceremony.	15,629 victims were accorded burial in 2019.
38	Nyamata^{*}	Memorial	Rwanda	Eastern	Bugesera	Other images	7.74 ha.		One of the four components of the UNESCO World Heritage property Memorial sites of the Genocide: Nyamata, Murambi, Gisozi and Bisesero.
39	Nyamirama Genocide Memorial	Memorial	Rwanda	Eastern	Kayonza	Other images			
40	Nyamishaba Genocide Memorial	Memorial	Rwanda	Southern	Huye	Other images			
41	Nyarubuye	Memorial	Rwanda	Eastern	Kirehe	Other images			The memorial underwent renovation work reported in 2013.
42	Nyarushishi Genocide Memorial	Memorial	Rwanda	Western	Rusizi	Other images			The construction and development of the Nyarushishi memorial in Rusizi have been documented in tourism and local reporting.
43	Nyundo	Memorial	Rwanda	Western	Rubavu	Other images	0.43 ha	9 April: commemoration.	According to Bishop Anaclet Mwumvaneza, the memorial is the main site where many Catholic priests killed in 1994 are buried.
44	Rebero	Memorial	Rwanda	Kigali	Kicukiro	Other images	1.17 ha	13 April: annual commemoration and tribute to politicians.	The memorial commemorates more than 21 political figures who opposed the genocidal policy.
45	Rubirizi Genocide Memorial	Memorial	Rwanda	Kigali	Kicukiro	Other images			
46	Ruhanga	Memorial	Rwanda	Kigali	Kicukiro	Other images	< 1 ha		Genocide survivors in Rusororo called for a memorial wall bearing the names of killed relatives.
47	Ruhashya Genocide Memorial	Memorial	Rwanda	Southern	Huye	Other images		2010: burial of additional remains.	The remains of more than 100 genocide victims were laid to rest at Ruhashya in 2010.
48	Rusiga	Memorial	Rwanda	Northern	Rulindo	Other images			The memorial is associated with the massacre at Rusiga church.
49	Muyumbu Genocide memorial site	Memorial	Rwanda	Eastern	Rwamagana	Other images		13 November 1994: first burial of victims at the memorial.	Described as Rwanda's first genocide memorial.
50	Jabana Genocide memorial site	Memorial	Rwanda	Kigali	Gasabo	Other images	0.2 ha		
51	Mutete Genocide Memorial	Memorial	Rwanda	Northern	Gicumbi	Other images	0.97 ha		
52	Kamonyi Genocide Memorial	Memorial	Rwanda	Southern	Kamonyi; Gacurabwenge, Kibuza	Other images		18 May 2026: burial of 30 additional victims.	The memorial contained the remains of 47,963 victims following the 2026 burial ceremony.
53	Nyanza Genocide Memorial (Southern Province)	Memorial	Rwanda	Southern	Nyanza				
54	Kabgayi Genocide Memorial	Memorial	Rwanda	Southern	Muhanga	Other images			The site is associated with genocide mass graves in the Kabgayi area.
55	Remera Genocide Memorial	Memorial	Rwanda	Eastern	Ngoma	Other images			
56	Rukara Genocide Memorial	Memorial	Rwanda	Eastern	Gatsibo	Other images			
57	Rukira Genocide Memorial	Memorial	Rwanda	Eastern	Ngoma	Other images			
58	Rukumberi Genocide Memorial	Memorial	Rwanda	Eastern	Ngoma; Rukumberi	Other images		16 April: commemoration of the Rukumberi massacres.	More than 45,000 victims are commemorated. The memorial also recalls victims killed at the ADEPR church and in the hills of the former Kibungo region.
59	Rwamagana Genocide Memorial	Memorial	Rwanda	Eastern	Rwamagana	Other images			
60	Shangi Genocide Memorial	Memorial	Rwanda	Western	Nyamasheke	Other images			
61	Songa Genocide Memorial	Memorial	Rwanda	Southern	Huye	Other images			
62	UNR Butare Genocide Memorial	Memorial	Rwanda	Southern	Huye	Other images			
63	Zaza Genocide Memorial	Memorial	Rwanda	Eastern	Ngoma	Other images			
64	Woluwe-Saint-Pierre memorial stele	Stele	Belgium	Brussels-Capital Region	Woluwe-Saint-Pierre	Other images		2004: inauguration.	The original inscription referring to the "Rwanda 1994 genocide" was later corrected to explicitly refer to the genocide against the Tutsi.
65	Brussels memorial plaque	Plaque	Belgium	Brussels-Capital Region	Brussels; Place Poelaert				A plaque commemorating the victims of the Rwandan genocide is located at Place Poelaert.
66	Liège memorial stele	Stele	Belgium	Wallonia	Liège; Parc d'Avroy				A memorial site dedicated to the victims of the genocide against the Tutsi was inaugurated by the City of Liège.
67	Paris memorial stele	Stele	France	Île-de-France	Paris; Père Lachaise Cemetery	Other images			A memorial in Paris dedicated to the victims of the genocide against the Tutsi.
68	Place Aminadabu-Birara	Square	France	Île-de-France	Paris	Other images		13 May 2022: inauguration.	Named after Aminadabu Birara, a leader of the Tutsi resistance at Bisesero.
69	Lyon memorial garden	Garden	France	Auvergne-Rhône-Alpes	Lyon; Parc Blandan	Other images			A garden dedicated to the victims of the genocide against the Tutsi in Rwanda.
70	Strasbourg memorial stele	Stele	France	Grand Est	Strasbourg; Cimetière Nord			27 January 2020: inauguration.	Located in Strasbourg's northern cemetery.
71	Amsterdam genocide memorial	Memorial	Netherlands	North Holland	Amsterdam; Beatrixpark	Other images		19 April 2023: inauguration.	The first permanent memorial in the Netherlands dedicated to the 1994 genocide against the Tutsi in Rwanda.
72	Liverpool memorial stele	Stele	United Kingdom	North West England	Liverpool; St John's Gardens			24 April 2013: inauguration.	Memorial to the victims of the Rwandan genocide in St John's Gardens.
73	Geneva memorial stele	Stele	Switzerland	Geneva	Geneva opposite the Place des Nations			8 April 2019: inauguration.	A memorial dedicated to the victims of the genocide against the Tutsi was inaugurated opposite the Place des Nations.
74	Cluny memorial stele	Stele	France	Bourgogne-Franche-Comté	Cluny; Esplanade des Quinconces			9 April 2011: inauguration.	A memorial stele dedicated to the victims of the genocide against the Tutsi.
75	Dieulefit memorial stele	Stele	France	Auvergne-Rhône-Alpes	Dieulefit			29 June 2013: inauguration.	The stele commemorates the victims of the genocide against the Tutsi.
76	L'Archive	Permanent memorial	France	Île-de-France	Paris; Esplanade Habib-Bourguiba, between Pont des Invalides and Pont de l'Alma, 7th arrondissement	Other images		2 June 2026: inauguration.	The permanent memorial was inaugurated by Emmanuel Macron and Paul Kagame.

^{*} Component of the UNESCO World Heritage Site Memorial sites of the Genocide: Nyamata, Murambi, Gisozi and Bisesero.
