= Musha Church massacre =

Event of the Rwandan Genocide

The Musha Church massacre was the killing of approximately 1180 Tutsi civilians in April 1994 by the Interahamwe, a Hutu paramilitary organization.

== Chronology ==
According to the ICTR verdict in the Paul Bisengimana case between the 8 and 13 April 1994, more than a thousand Tutsi civilians sought refuge at Musha Church, situated in Rutoma sector, Gikoro commune, Kigali-Rural préfecture, having fled from attacks against Tutsi civilians occurring throughout the préfecture. On about April 12, 1994, guns and grenades were distributed to Interahamwe militiamen and other armed civilians at Musha Church by members of the Rwandan Army. On about 13 April 1994, an attack was launched against the Tutsi civilians seeking refuge at the church. The attackers used guns, grenades, machetes, pangas and other traditional weapons. This attack resulted in the killing of more than a thousand Tutsi civilians. During the attack, a civilian militiaman named Manda set fire to the church, causing the death of many refugees.
