= Jean-Damascène Bizimana =

Rwandan diplomat

Jean-Damascène Bizimana (born 1950s) is a former Rwandan diplomat. He was ambassador of Rwanda to the United Nations.

At the time of the assassination of president Habyarimana of Rwanda, Bizimana held a non-permanent seat on the United Nations Security Council. He was associated with several leaders of the Hutu Power movement, and has been accused by some, such as General Roméo Dallaire, of aiding the Rwandan genocide by passing information on Security Council deliberations to the Rwandan government at the centre of the genocide.

In an interview several years later, Michael Barnett, a diplomat with the United States mission spoke of the level of frustration at Bizimana's statements by those who were aware of what was happening in Rwanda but like the United States, didn't want to assist and stop the genocide."Nobody said, 'Why don't you get out of the room?' There was never a real moment in which they dressed him down, because if you did, you would be breaking the rules of the club."

In 2010, researcher David L. Bosco discovered that Bizimana and his family had settled in Opelika, Alabama, where he had become a naturalized citizen and was working as a quality-control manager for a plastic products manufacturer.

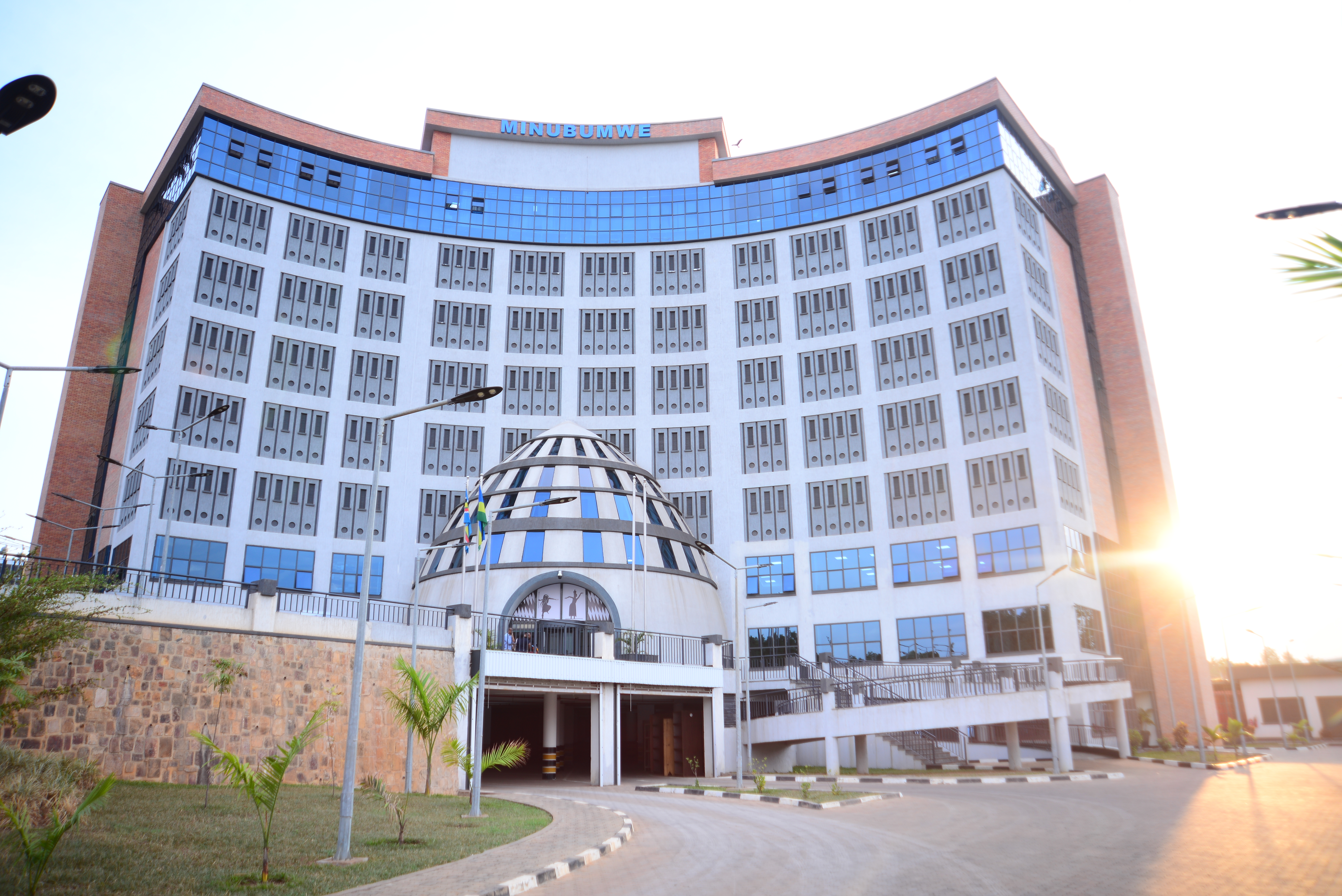
Ministry of National Unity & Civic Engagement building
