= Ndaba rock =

Rwandan cultural site and tourist centre

Ndaba Rocks, commonly known in Kinyarwanda as "Urutare rwa Ndaba," is a Rwandan cultural site and one of Karongi district's most popular tourist attractions.

== Mythical stories around Ndaba rock ==
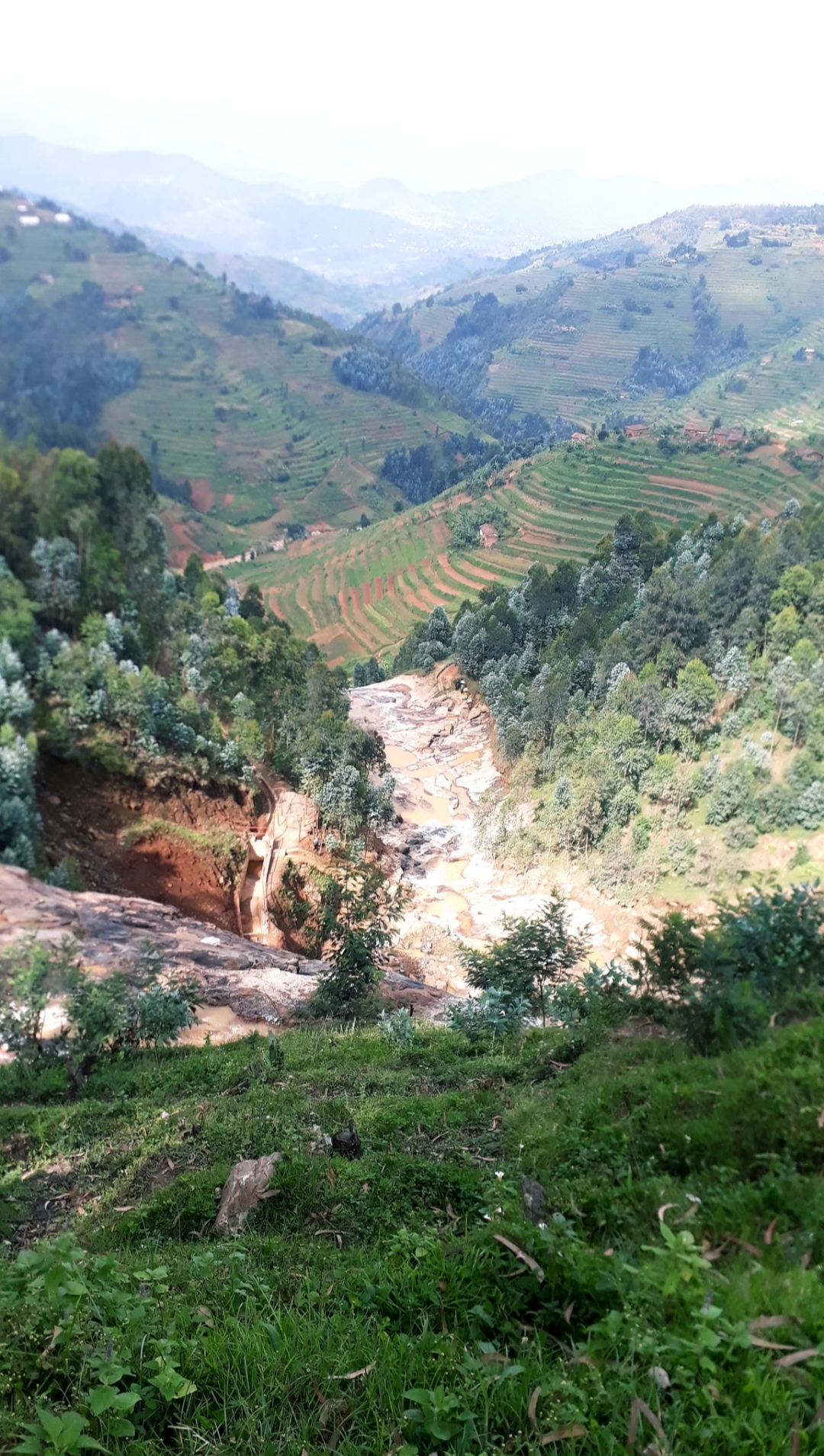

It is assumed that before the dawn of civilization, a well-known "Ndaba" resided in the forest surrounding the rock and hunted for a time. While out hunting for wild game and honey with his pals, he came across a rock with a large bees hole. He went to the hole because he was curious and ambitious, and he saw a lot of honey flowing from the honeycombs. He called his pals, telling them what he had found and urging them to go to the bottom and collect some of it. He dived down the hole to get some honey before his companions came, and once he was at the bottom, he started feeding himself that honey. The honey was plentiful to the point that the bees were unconcerned, but he ate excessively and lost vitality as a result of his hunger. As the sun began to set, the companions realized it was becoming dark, so they called his name and asked him to get up so they could return home. Unfortunately, Ndaba was stuffed to the brim and was unable to pull himself up. They chose to abandon him, and when he attempted to climb out of the hole, he slid and plummeted back to the bottom, losing his life. Today, this rock is known as the ndaba Rock, and it is home to several beautiful waterfalls.
