= Our Lady of Wisdom Cathedral, Butare =

Our Lady of Wisdom Cathedral
- Cathédrale Notre-Dame de la Sagesse
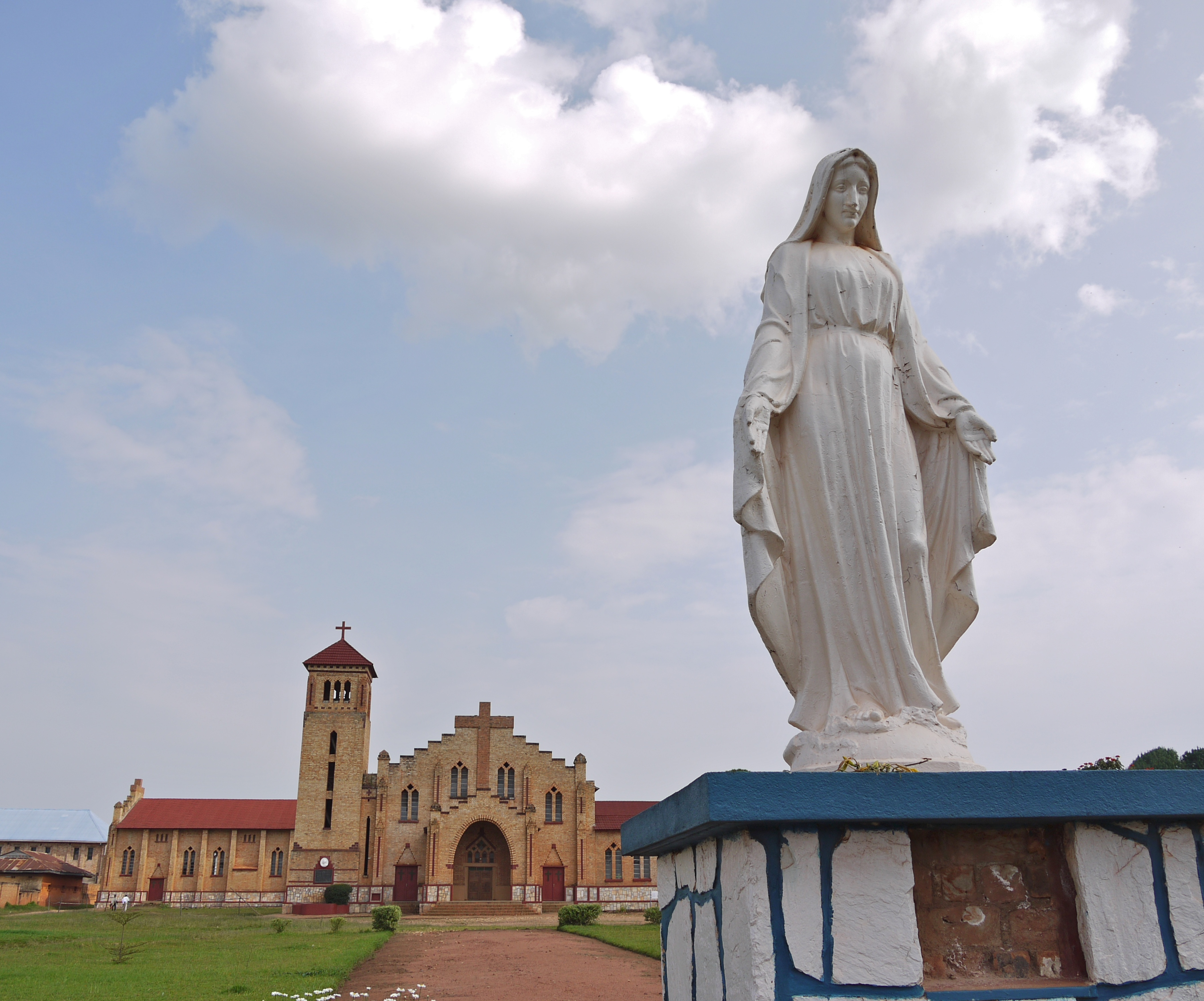
- Our Lady of Wisdom Cathedral
- Location: Butare
- Country: Rwanda
- Denomination: Roman Catholic Church
- Website: butarecatholicdiocese.com

The Our Lady of Wisdom (French: Cathédrale Notre-Dame de la Sagesse) or simply Cathedral of Butare, is a religious building belonging to the Catholic Church and is located in the town of Butare, in the southern part of the African country of Rwanda.

It is the largest cathedral in the nation, which was built in the 1930s when Butare (known as Astrida after 1935) was the colonial capital to commemorate the life of Astrid of Sweden Queen consort of the Belgians until 1935.

The cathedral follows the Roman or Latin rite and serves as the seat of the Diocese of Butare (Dioecesis Butarensis) which was erected in 1961 by Pope John XXIII by bula Gaudet sanctum.

== See also ==
- Cathedral Basilica of Our Lady
- Catholic Church in Rwanda
