= Anti-corruption Monument of Rwanda =

Monument in Kigali, Rwanda

Coordinates: 1°57′20.7″S 30°5′40.1″E

The Anti-corruption monument of Rwanda, located at Kigali Convention Center (KCC) in Rwanda, is a 12-meter tall monument built in recognition of Rwanda's anti-corruption policies. The monument was designed by Iraqi artist Ahmed Al Bahrani, built in 2019 during the International Anti-Corruption Excellence Awards, and paid for by the government of Qatar.

== Description ==
The sculpture depicts an extended, open palm, representing transparency and openness and implying that Rwanda has nothing to conceal from the rest of the world. The 12-meter-high monument is made up of pivots and linkages to represent the importance of worldwide alliances and collaborations in the fight against corruption. The 186 triangular joints that make up the monument reflect the signatories to the United Nations Convention Against Corruption. Its goal is to inspire individuals to fight corruption with a "never-say-die" attitude and tenacity.
