= Johnston Busingye =

Rwandan lawyer

His Excellency Johnston Busingye
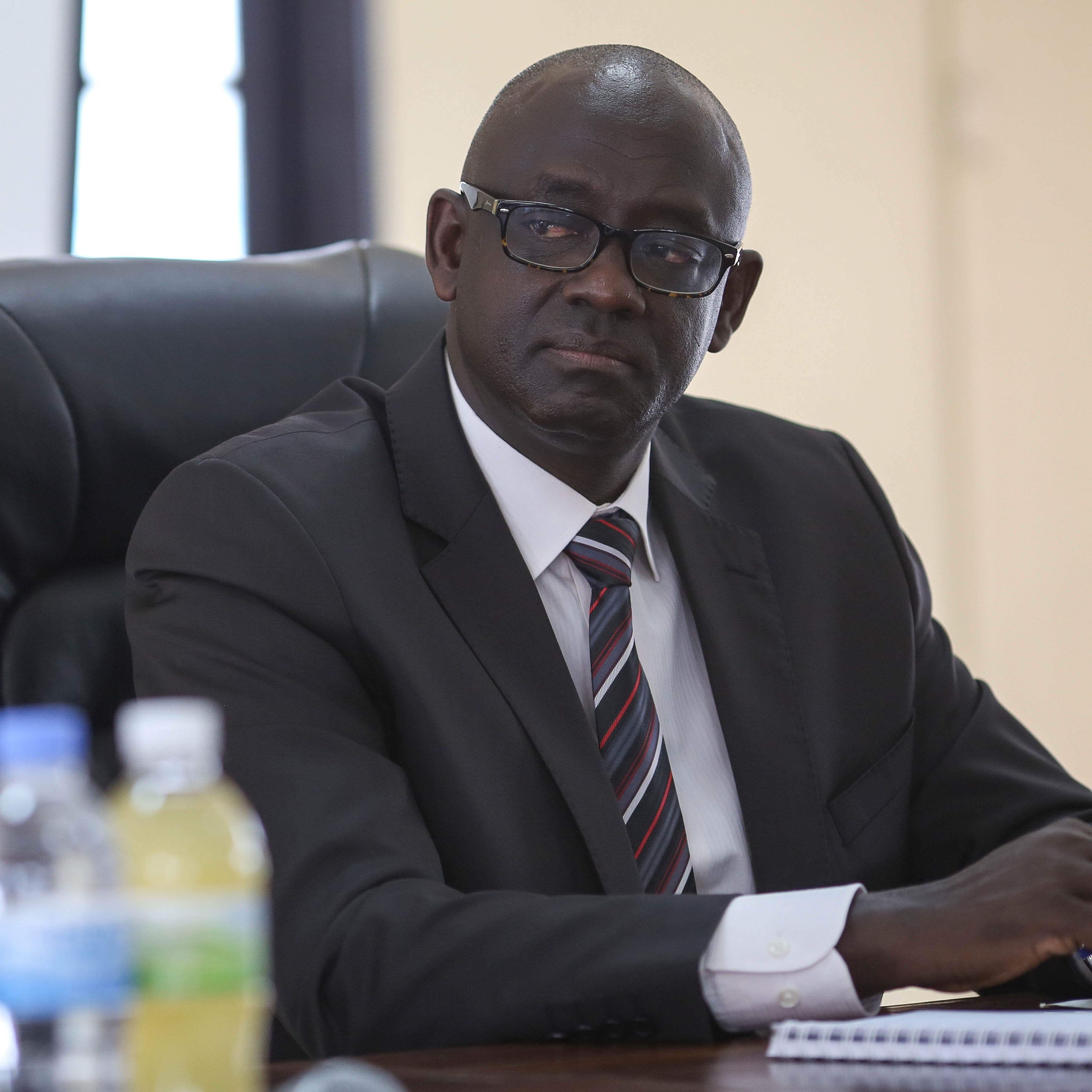
- Johnston Busingye (2014)
- Citizenship: Rwandan
- Education: Makerere University (Bachelor of Laws); Law Development Centre (Diploma in Legal Practice); Harvard Kennedy School (Diploma in Governance)
- Occupations: Politician, lawyer
- Years active: 1989–present
- Known for: The law, politics
- Title: High Commissioner of Rwanda to the United Kingdom

Johnston Busingye is a Rwandan lawyer, who is the current High Commissioner of Rwanda to the United Kingdom. Previously, he served as the Minister of Justice and Attorney General, from 2013 to 2022.

== Background and education ==
He has a Bachelor of Laws, obtained from Makerere University. He also holds a Diploma in Legal Practice, awarded by the Law Development Centre in Kampala.

== Career ==
Johnston Busingye has held many positions in the Rwandan government and Rwandan judiciary. from 2006 until 2013, he served as the President of the High Court of Rwanda. Other responsibilities in the past, include as the National Prosecutor of Rwanda, as Permanent Secretary in the Ministry of Justice(Minijust), and as Principal Judge of the East African Court of Justice (EACJ). In his capacity as Minister of Justice, he announced in July 2014, the decision by the government of Rwanda, not to become a member of the International Criminal Court (ICC).

== See also ==
- Cabinet of Rwanda
