= National Commission for the Fight against Genocide =

Organization based in Rwanda

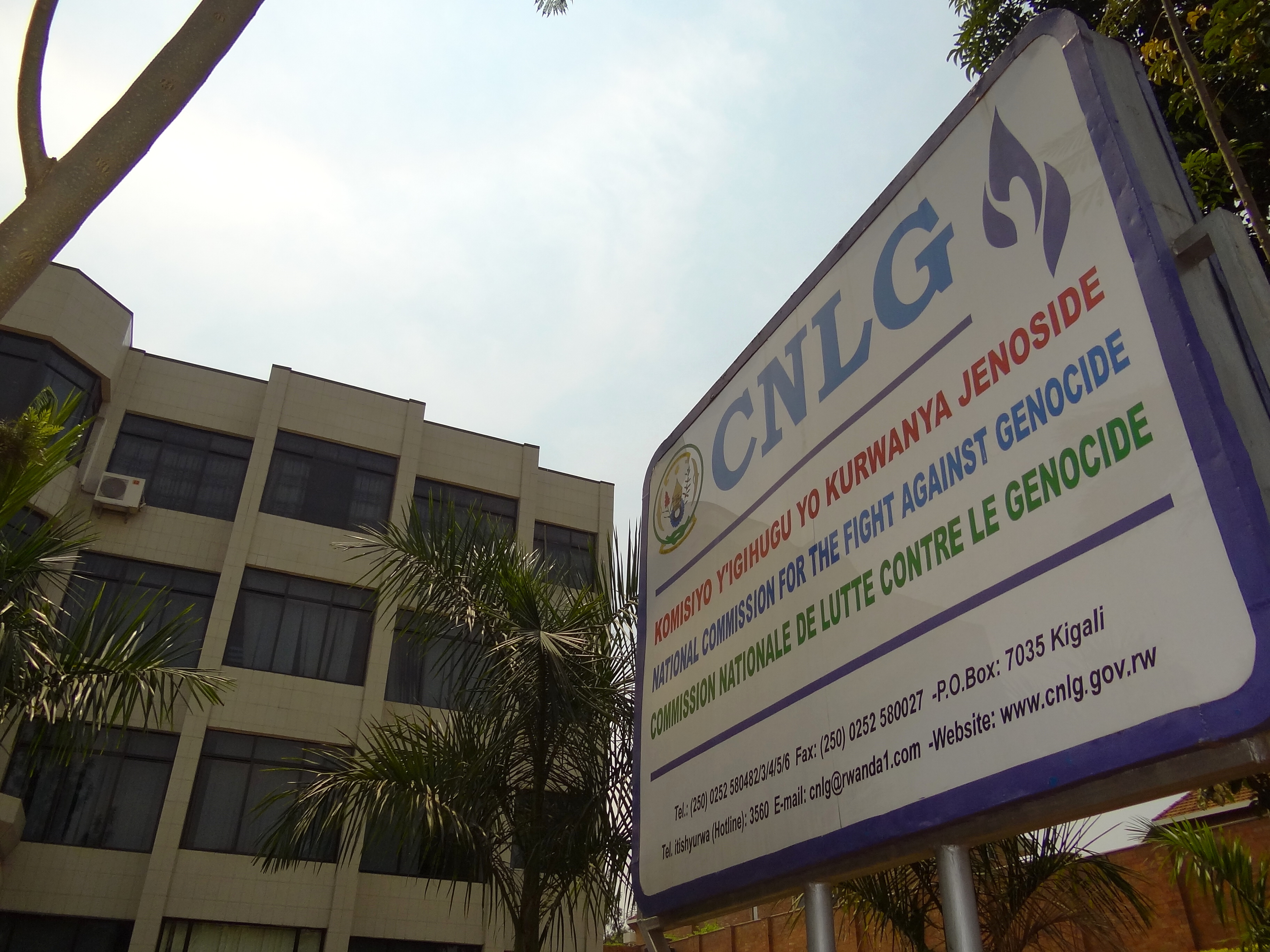
The Commission for the Fight against Genocide's headquarters in Kigali in 2012

The National Commission for the Fight against Genocide (CNLG) is a Rwandan organisation that is concerned with the 1994 Rwanda genocide. They are involved with studying what happened. Their mission is to preserve the memory of the crimes and to study how it can be avoided. The organisation is mandated by section 179 of the Constitution of Rwanda.

One of their actions was to create the Kigali Genocide Memorial Centre which they achieved in collaboration with the city's council and the Aegis Trust. The Aegis Trust now manage the centre.

== Mission ==
To prevent and fight against Genocide, its ideology and overcoming its consequences.
