= Nyamata Genocide Memorial Centre =

Nyamata Genocide Memorial
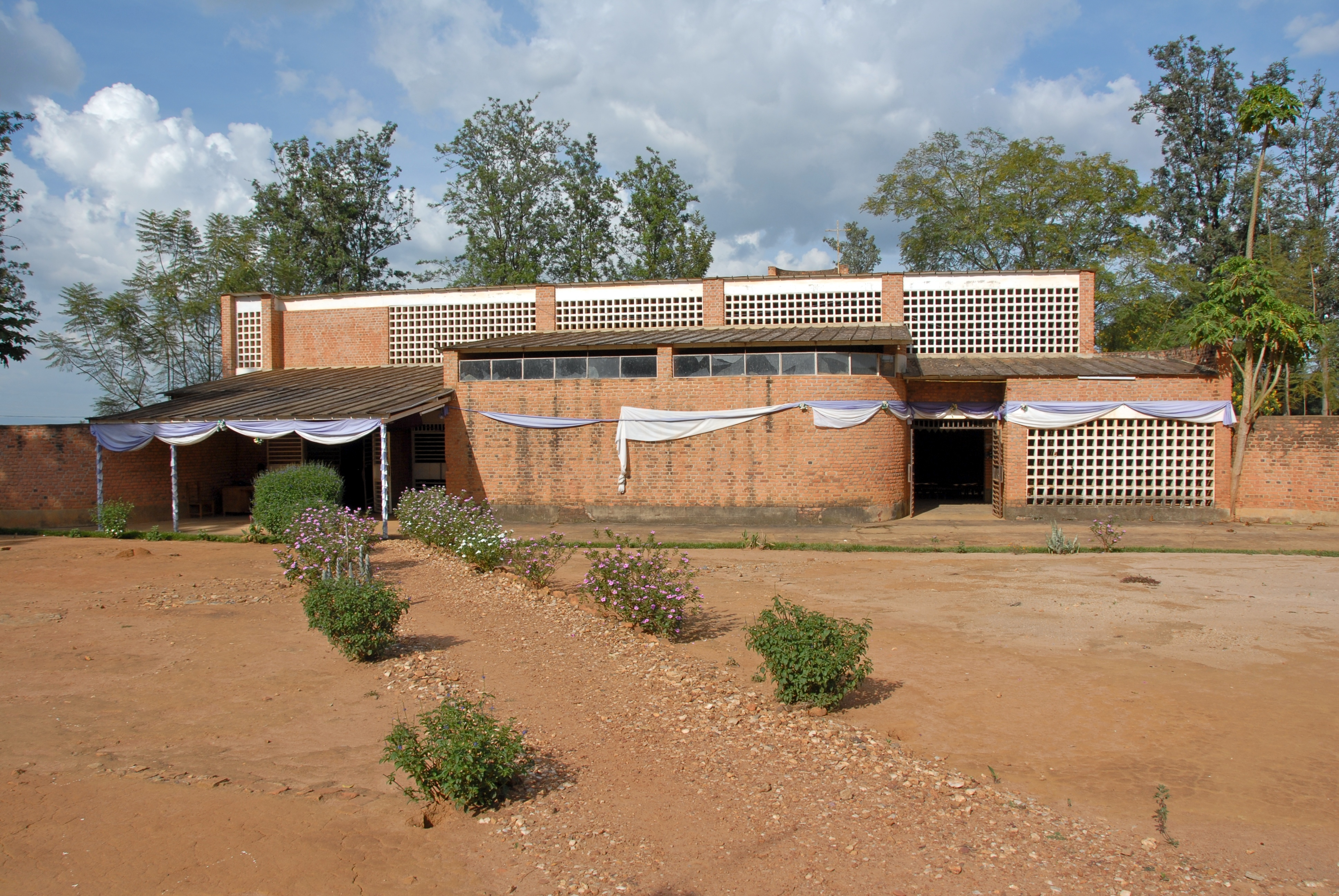

- Location within Rwanda

UNESCO World Heritage Site
- Part of: Memorial sites of the 1994 Genocide against the Tutsi in Rwanda
- Criteria: Cultural: vi
- Reference: 1586-001
- Inscription: 2023 (45th Session)
- Coordinates: 2.149°S 30.094°E

The Nyamata Genocide Memorial is a national memorial and World Heritage Site in Rwanda commemorating the 1994 Rwandan genocide against the Tutsi ethnic group. It is based around a former church in the town of Nyamata, roughly 30 km (19 mi) south of the capital of Kigali, where thousands of Tutsi were killed. The remains of 50,000 people are buried there.

== Location ==

Some memorials of the 1994 Genocide against the Tutsi in Rwanda.

The memorial is based around a former church which is about 30 km (19 mi) south of Kigali in Rwanda, which commemorates the 1994 Genocide against Tutsi in Rwanda. It is one of six national memorial sites in Rwanda that commemorate the genocide. The others are the Murambi Memorial Centre, Bisesero Genocide Memorial Centre, Ntarama Genocide Memorial Centre, Kigali Genocide Memorial, and Nyarubuye Memorial. There are over 250 registered memorial sites that commemorate genocide in Rwanda.

== 1994 Rwandan genocide ==
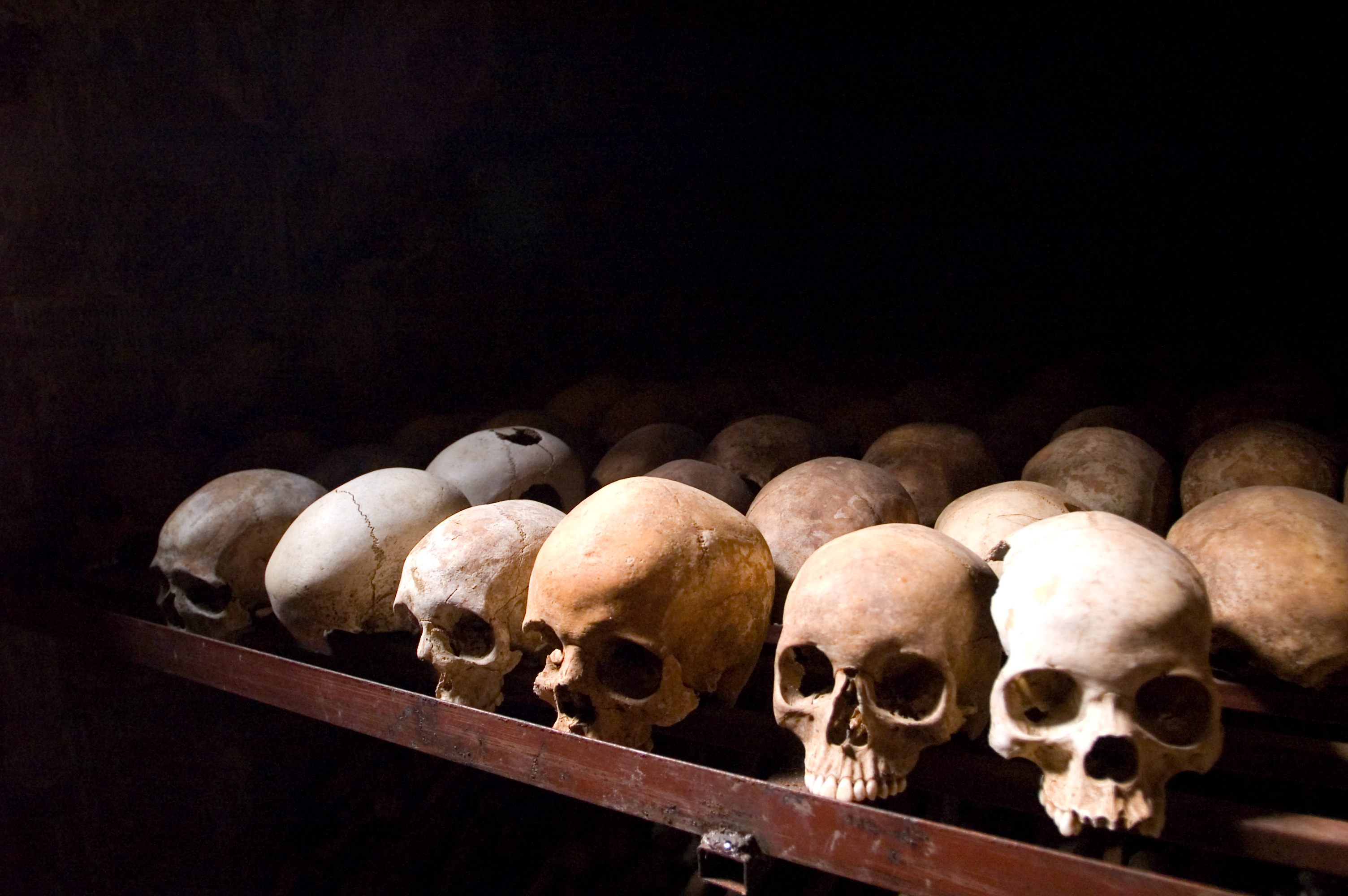
Human skulls at the Nyamata Genocide Memorial Centre

The genocide against the Tutsi in Rwanda began in April 1994. Many Tutsi people gathered in churches, which were considered safe places. About 10,000 people gathered there and locked themselves in. The attackers made holes in the walls of the church so that grenades could be thrown into the church, after which the rest were shot with guns or killed with machetes.

Most of the remains have been buried but clothing and identity cards are left. The identity cards were what identified people as either Tutsi or Hutu.

People in the surrounding area were also killed after the massacre at the church. The remains of 50,000 people are buried here.

== Status ==
In 2023, the memorials at Nyamata and three other locations were officially made World Heritage Sites by UNESCO.

== See also ==
- List of World Heritage Sites in Rwanda
