= Bisesero Genocide Memorial Centre =

Museum in Western Province, Rwanda

Bisesero Genocide Memorial
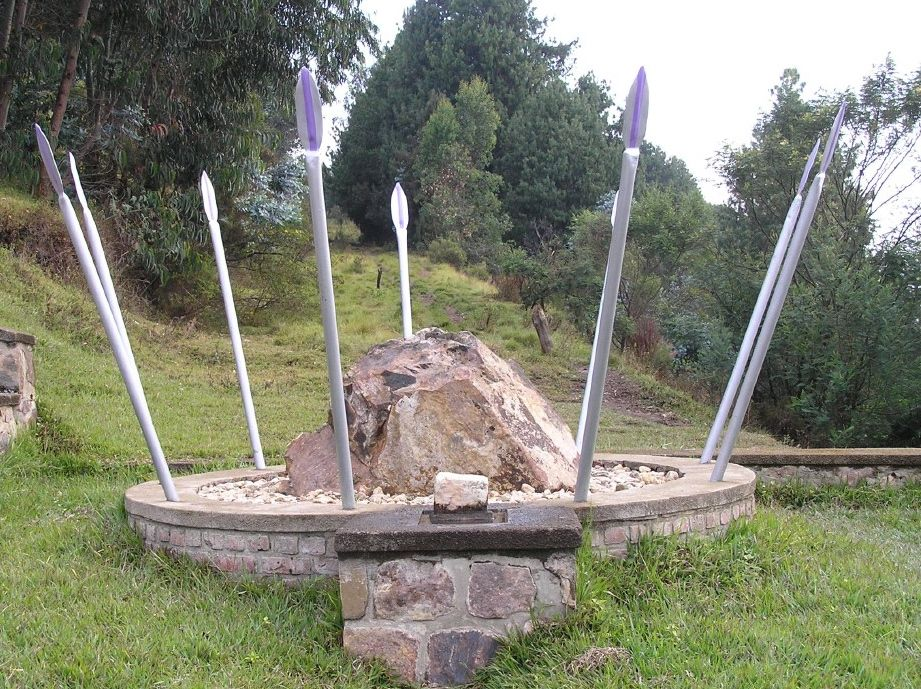
- Memorial centre sculpture

- Location within Rwanda
- Established: 1 June 1994 (centre)
- Coordinates: 2.179°S 29.338°E
- Type: Genocide museum

UNESCO World Heritage Site
- Part of: Memorial sites of the 1994 Genocide against the Tutsi in Rwanda
- Criteria: Cultural: vi
- Reference: 1586-004
- Inscription: 2023 (45th Session)
- Coordinates: 2.192011°S 29.341274°E

The Bisesero Genocide Memorial is a national memorial in Rwanda which commemorates the 1994 Rwandan genocide. 40,000 people were killed where the memorial now stands.

Some memorials of the 1994 Genocide against the Tutsi in Rwanda.

== Location ==
The memorial is on Muyira hill at the small settlement of Bisesero, which is about 60 km of road away from Kibuye, Rwanda.

== History ==
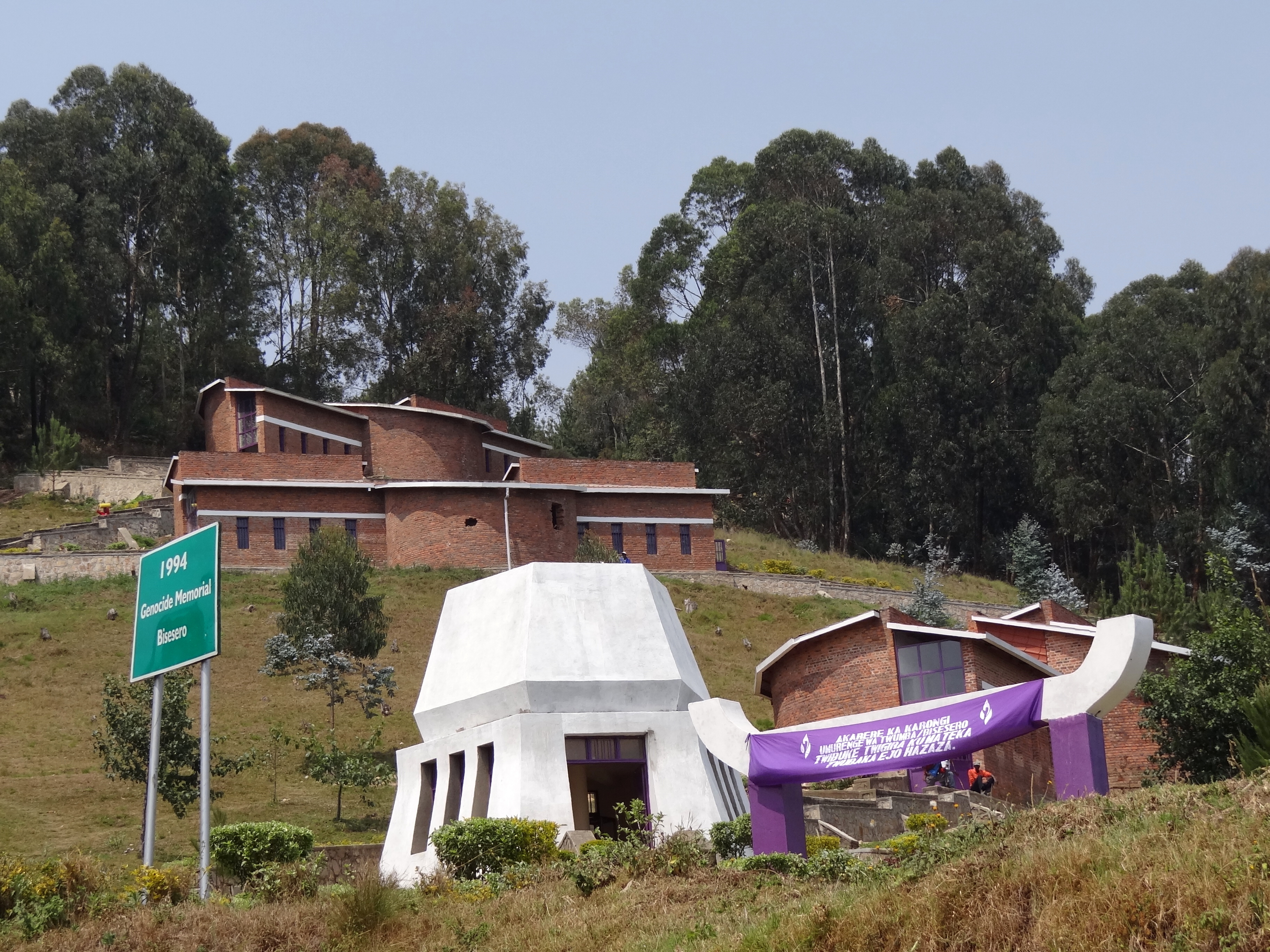
The Memorial Centre

Genocide against the Tutsi began in April 1994. 40,000 people died in the area around Bisesero. Unusually these people offered some defence and they appealed to French peace keeping troops for assistance. The troops had no mandate to intervene and they withdrew from the carnage. 40,000 Rwandans died around Bisesero.

This memorial began on the fourth anniversary of the genocide when the then Rwandan President laid a stone here in 1998. The centre is one of six major centres in Rwanda that commemorate the 1994 Tutsi genocide. The others are the Kigali Memorial Centre, Murambi Memorial Centre, Ntarama Memorial Centre, Nyamata Memorial Centre, and Nyarubuye Memorial Center. In 2012, four of the memorial centres: Bisesero, Gisozi (City of Kigali), Murambi and Nyamata were proposed as Rwanda national monuments. They are looked after by the National Commission for the Fight against Genocide.
