= Kigali Genocide Memorial =

Museum in Kigali, Rwanda

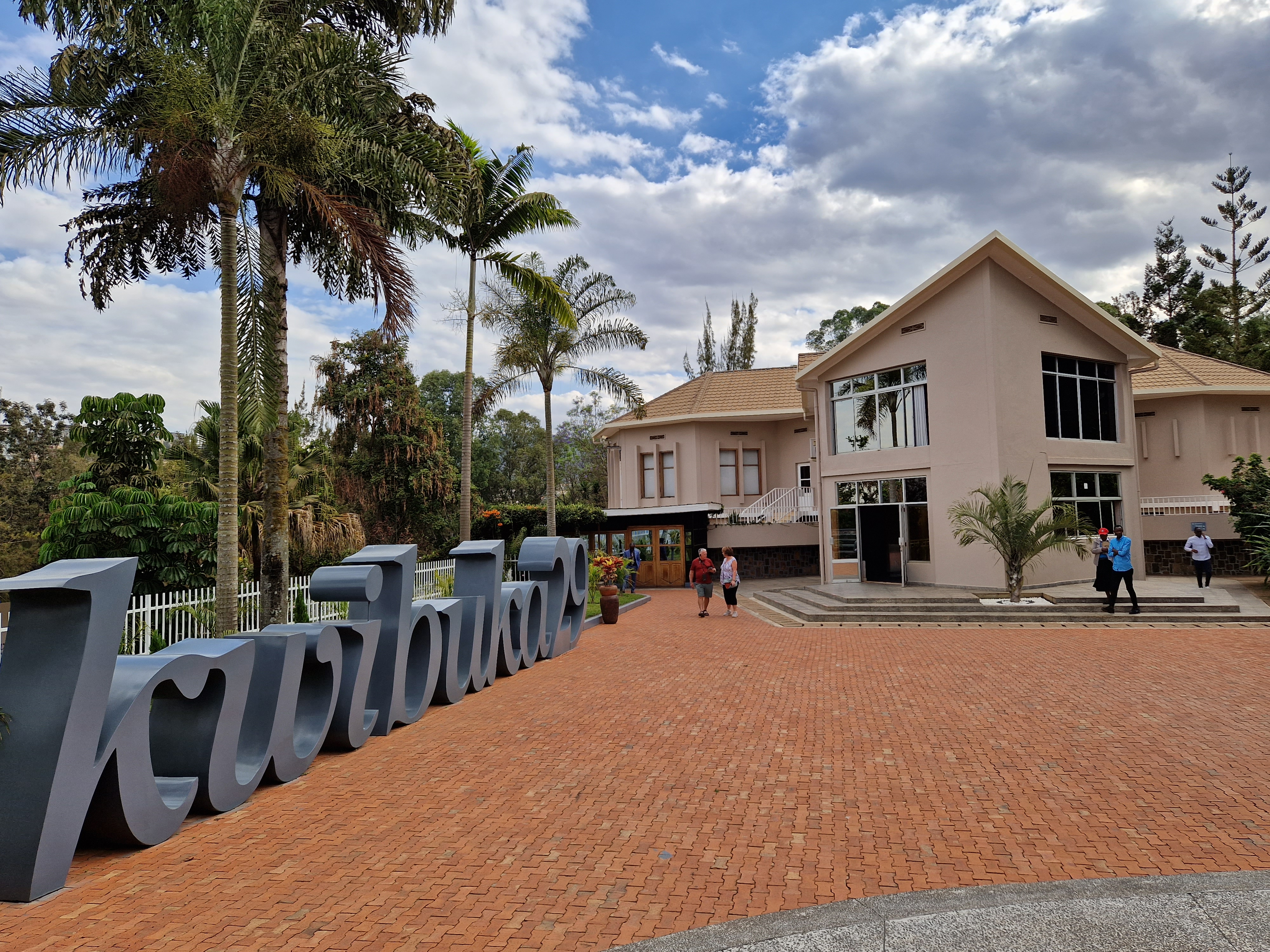

- Location within Rwanda
- Established: 1999 (Construction); April 2004 (Inaugurated)
- Location: KG 14 Avenue, Kigali

UNESCO World Heritage Site
- Part of: Memorial sites of the 1994 Genocide against the Tutsi in Rwanda
- Criteria: Cultural: vi
- Reference: 1586-003
- Inscription: 2023 (45th Session)
- Coordinates: 1.93124°S 30.060133°E
- Type: Genocide museum
- Visitors: 96,278 (2017)

The Kigali Genocide Memorial commemorates the 1994 Rwandan genocide. The remains of over 250,000 people are interred there.

There is a visitor centre for students and others wishing to understand the events leading up to the Rwanda genocide against Tutsi in 1994. The Centre is a permanent memorial to those who fell victim to the genocide and serves as a place where the bereaved could bury their family and friends. The Centre is managed and run by the Aegis Trust on behalf of the National Commission for the Fight Against Genocide.

== Location ==

Some memorials of the 1994 Genocide against the Tutsi in Rwanda.

The memorial and the memorial centre are in Gisozi, Rwanda, just outside of central Kigali.

== Background ==
In April 1994, reports of systematic mass murder within Rwanda began to filter out of Rwanda and circulate throughout the world. Little was done to stop the genocide. To outsiders, the genocide was represented as tribal-based ethnic violence, with the Tutsis as the victims and the Hutus as the perpetrators. Precisely how many people were actually murdered may never be known; estimates vary between 500,000 and over a million. The number of people killed is widely accepted as being somewhere close to 800,000.

== History ==
In 2000, the Kigali City Council began to construct a building, which would eventually become the Memorial Centre. Aegis was invited to turn the genocide memorial center into a reality. The Aegis Trust then began to collect data from across the world to create the three graphical exhibits. The text for all three was printed in three languages, designed in the UK at the Aegis head office by their design team, and shipped to Rwanda to be installed.

This memorial centre is one of six major centres in Rwanda that commemorate the Rwandan genocide. The others are the Murambi Genocide Memorial Centre, Bisesero Genocide Memorial Centre and Ntarama Genocide Memorial Centre, the Nyamata Genocide Memorial Centre and the Genocide Memorial Centre in Nyarubuye.

Human remains were brought from all over the capital after they had been left in the street or thrown in the river. They are buried together in lots of 100,000. The memorial was opened in 1999.

The centre started when Kigali City Council and the Rwandan National Commission for the Fight against Genocide commissioned a UK-based genocide prevention organization called Aegis Trust to establish the Kigali Genocide Memorial Centre. In April 2004, on the 10th anniversary of the genocide, the Kigali Genocide Memorial was inaugurated.

The response from genocide survivors to the creation of the centre was immense. In the first week, over 1,500 survivors visited each day. In the first three months of the centre's opening, around 60,000 people from a variety of backgrounds visited it. Over 7,000 of these visitors were from the international community.

== Facility ==
The centre documents the genocide, but it also describes the history of Rwanda that preceded the event. Comparisons are also made with similar sites in Germany, Japan, Cambodia, and Bosnia. Unlike the ex-concentration camps at Auschwitz Birkenau, the Rwanda site include human remains and the tools and weapons used in their destruction.

The upstairs floor of the centre includes three permanent exhibitions, the largest of which documents the genocide in 1994, providing historical context to the genocide. There is a children’s memorial, with life-sized photos, accompanied by personal details about their favorite toys, their last words and the manner in which they were killed. There is also an exhibition on the history of genocidal violence around the world.

The Kigali Memorial Centre is international. It deals with a topic of international importance, with far-reaching significance, and is designed to engage and challenge an international visitor base.

Audiovisual and GPS documentation projects record and substantiate survivor testimony and also record the Gacaca court process. The Memorial has had hundreds of thousands of visitors. The memorial concludes with sections on the search for justice through the international tribunal in Arusha as well as the local Gacaca courts (traditional tribunals headed by village elders).

The informative audio tour (US$15) includes background on the divisive colonial experience in Rwanda and as the visit progresses, the exhibits become steadily more powerful, as visitors are confronted with the crimes that took place here and moving video testimony from survivors.

The commission from the Kigali City Council was to develop the memorial site, where up to 250,000 genocide victims were buried in mass graves, into a memorial centre and permanent exhibition for the benefit of survivors and young people. The Aegis Trust manages the Kigali Genocide Memorial and is developing it with a school of education.

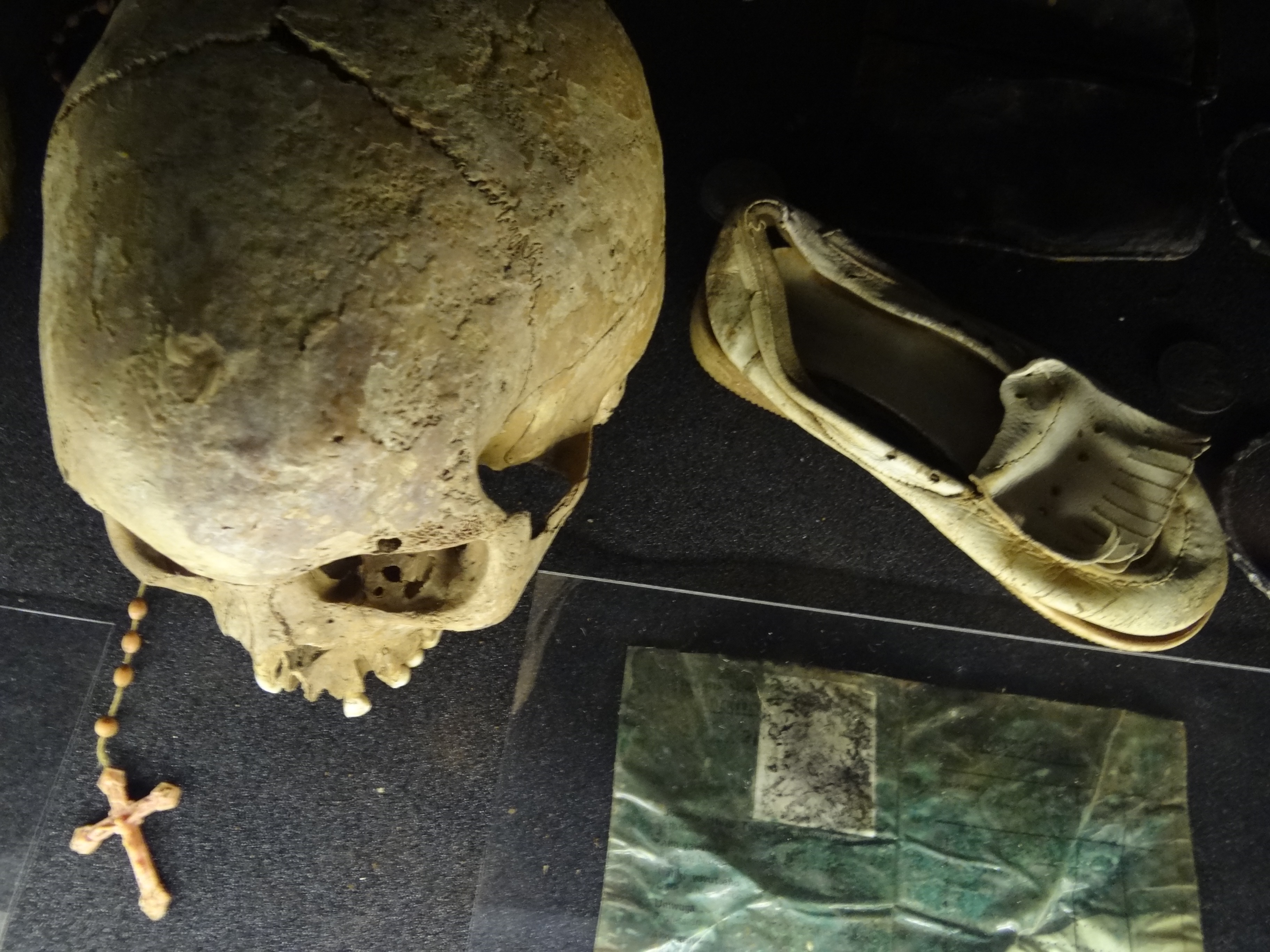
Skull and belongings of Genocide victims at the centre

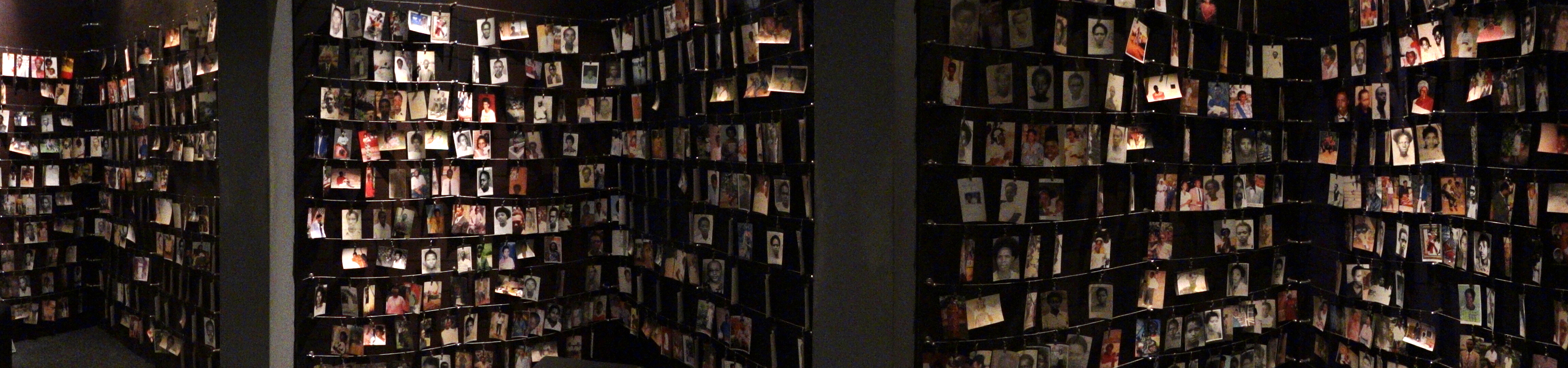
Genocide victims

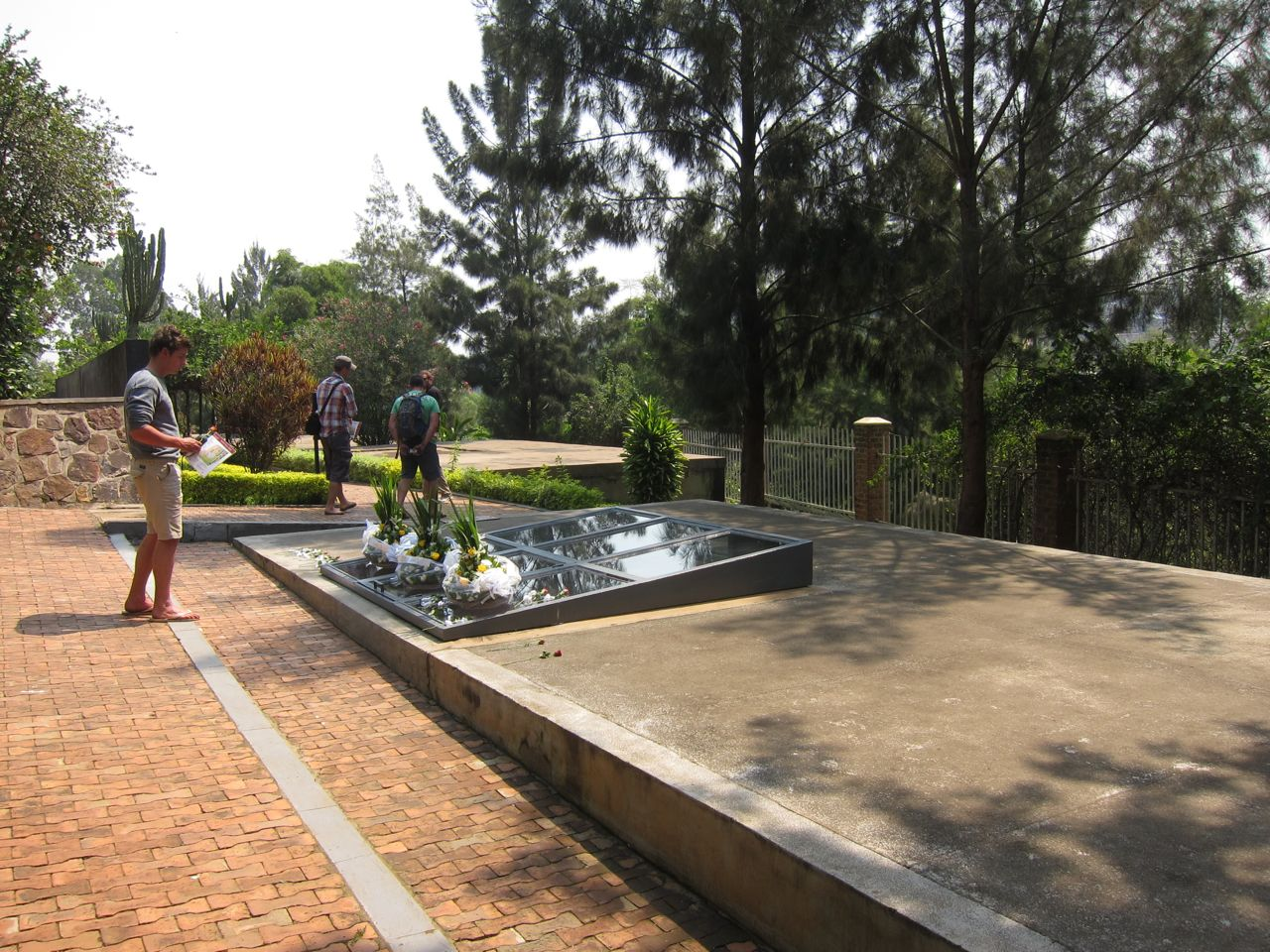
Kigali Genocide Memorial site

Kigali Genocide Memorial building
