= Ntarama Genocide Memorial Centre =

Genocide museum in Ntarama, Rwanda

Ntarama Genocide Memorial
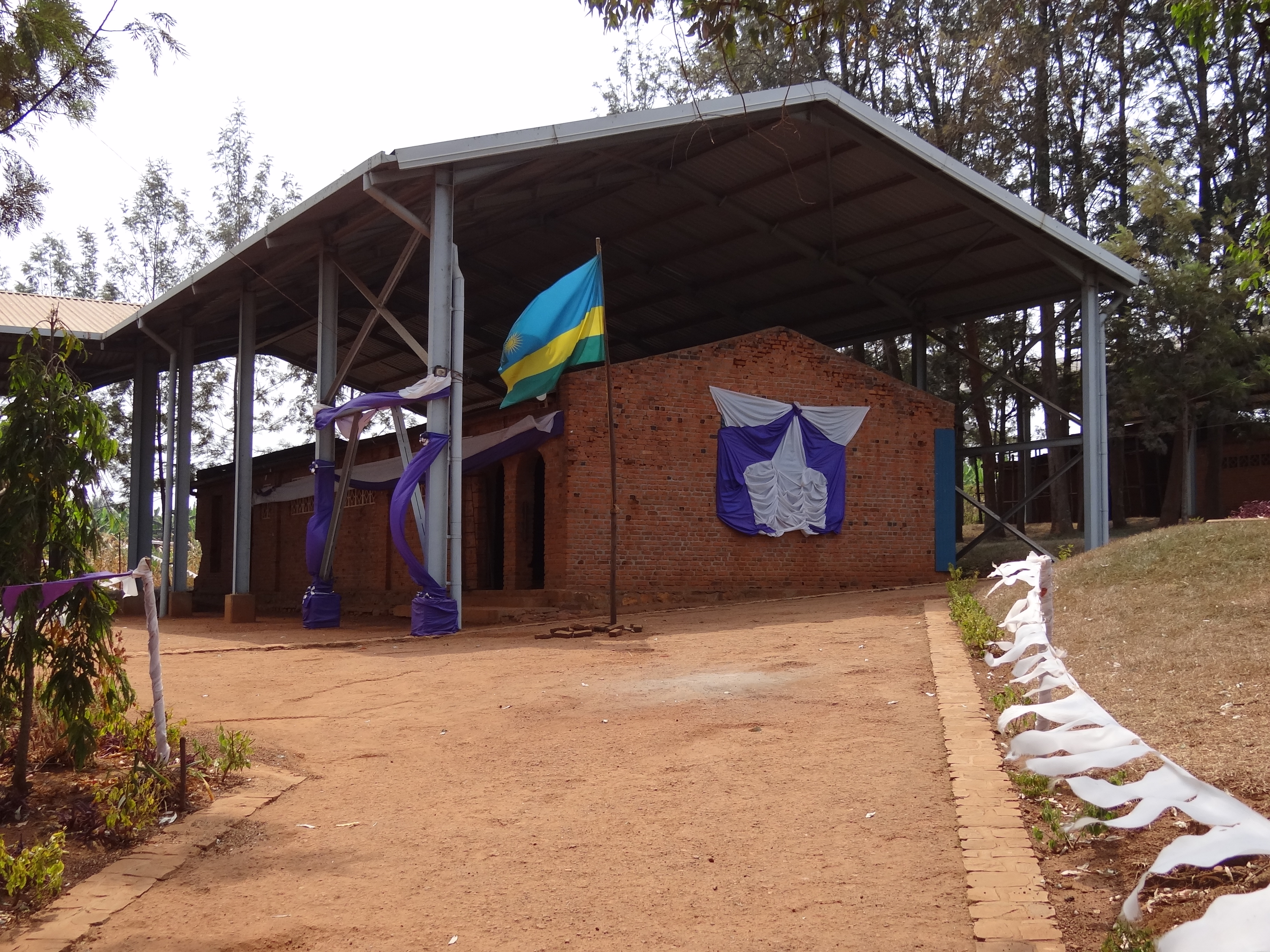

- Location within Rwanda
- Established: 1 June 2004
- Location: Ntarama
- Coordinates: 2.1097°S 30.374°E
- Type: Genocide museum

Ntarama Genocide Memorial Centre (Kinyarwanda: Urwibutso rwa jenoside rwa Ntarama, French: Mémorial du génocide à Ntarama) is a former Catholic church and one of six genocide museums in Rwanda in which five thousand people were killed during the Rwandan genocide.

== Location ==
Ntarama is located in Bugesera District. It is an hour's drive south of Kigali, the national capital and the largest city in the country.

== Overview ==

Some memorials of the 1994 Genocide against the Tutsi in Rwanda.

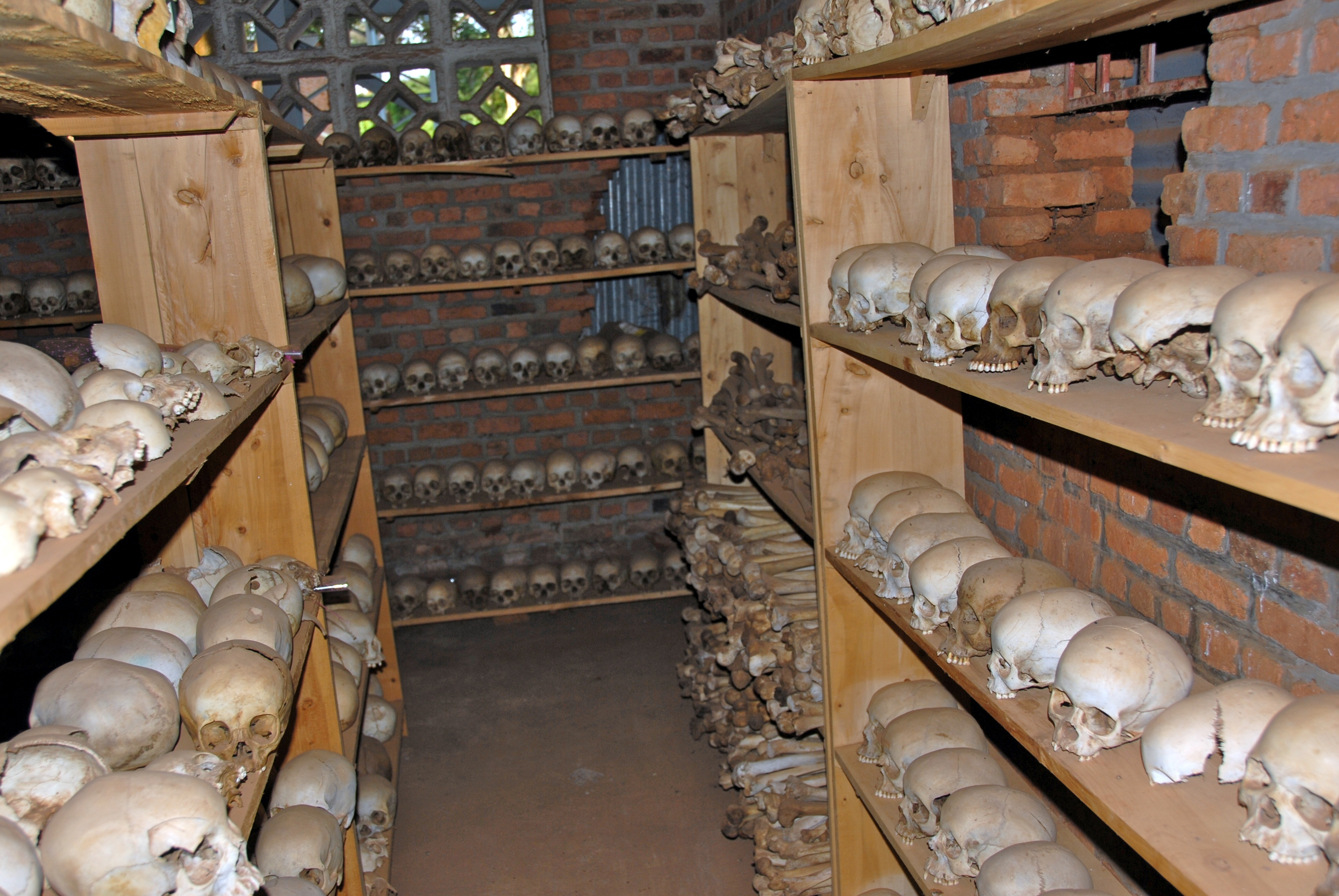
Shelves of skulls

Ntarama's former Catholic church is now a memorial site. Five thousand people were massacred there on 15 April 1994 during the Rwandan genocide.

This memorial centre is one of six major centres in Rwanda that commemorate the Rwandan genocide. The others are the Murambi Memorial Centre, the Kigali Genocide Memorial Centre and others at Nyamata, Bisesero, and Nyarubuye.

During the genocide, people were killed at this church by the police, soldiers, Interahamwe and local volunteers. They used grenades, spears, clubs and machetes. The government in charge would send 'clean up squads' to the sites of massacres to hide the evidence. The bodies of the dead would be hastily buried in mass graves. The people inside, who had tried to escape, were killed in nearby fields while the majority were killed inside the building of the church. When the government changed, they decided not to bury the bodies. The bones of those who had died outside were stacked on tables, but the bodies of those inside were left where they were murdered. For many years after the massacre, visitors could smell the rotting flesh from inside the church. But, by 1997, all that was left were the remains of the bodies left after a massacre.

== See also ==
- List of massacres in Rwanda
