= Murambi Genocide Memorial Centre =

Murambi Genocide Memorial
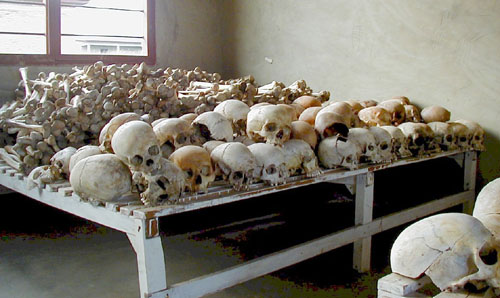
- Skulls of genocide victims (2001)

- Location within Rwanda
- Established: 21 April 1995

UNESCO World Heritage Site
- Part of: Memorial sites of the 1994 Genocide against the Tutsi in Rwanda
- Criteria: Cultural: vi
- Reference: 1586-002
- Inscription: 2023 (45th Session)
- Coordinates: 2.455528°S 29.567722°E

The Murambi Technical School, now known as the Murambi Genocide Memorial Centre, is situated near the town of Murambi in southern Rwanda.

== Description ==

Some memorials of the 1994 Genocide against the Tutsi in Rwanda.

This Memorial Center is one of six major centres in Rwanda that commemorate the 1994 genocide against Tutsi in Rwanda. The others are the Kigali Memorial Centre, Ntarama Memorial Centre and others at Nyamata Genocide Memorial Centre, Bisesero Memorial Centre and Nyarubuye.

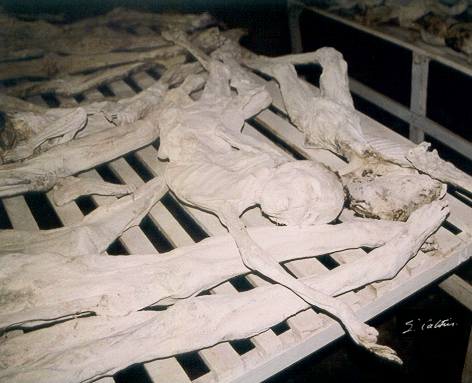
Mummified bodies of genocide victims. 2001

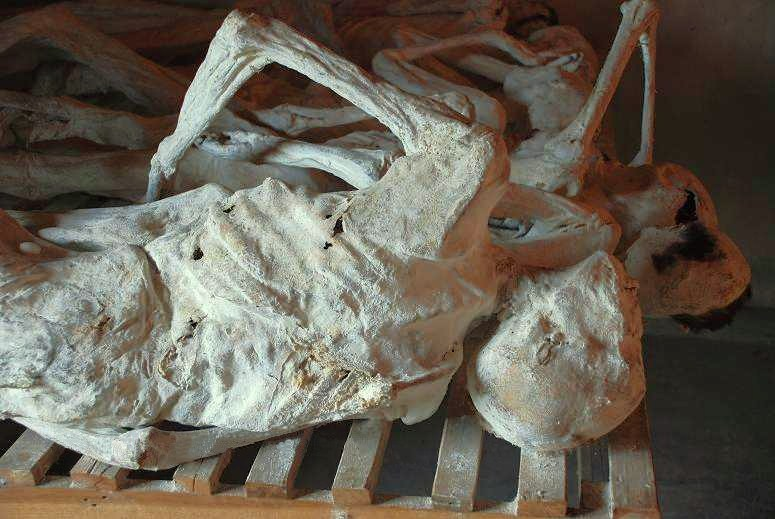
Mummified genocide victims.

This was the site of a massacre during the 1994 Rwandan genocide. When the killings started, Tutsis in the region tried to hide at a local church. However, the bishop and mayor lured them into a trap by sending them to the technical school, claiming that French troops would protect them there. On April 16, 1994, an average of 65,000 Tutsis traveled to the school. Once the victims arrived, no water or food was provided. This was done to ensure the people were too weak to resist. After defending themselves for a few days using stones, the Tutsi were overrun on April 21.

The French soldiers disappeared and the school was attacked by Hutu Interahamwe militiamen. Some 20,000 Tutsi were murdered at the school, and almost all of those who managed to escape were killed the next day when they tried to hide in a nearby church. The death toll of around 50,000 given by the government is not supported by the number of bodies exhumed, even considering yet to be opened graves and unburied bodies. According to the guide at the memorial, the French brought in heavy equipment to dig several pits where many thousands of bodies were placed. They then placed a volleyball court over the mass graves in an attempt to hide what happened. Among the bodies currently displayed are those of children and infants.

Only 34 people are thought to have survived the massacre in Murambi.

The memorial was founded on 21 April 1995. The site contains 50,000 graves. The school building is now a genocide museum exhibiting the skeletons and mummified bodies of some of the thousands of people killed in Gikongoro Province in 1994. In his study of Rwandan genocide memorials, Timothy Longman argues that although the bodies on display at Murambi are presented as those of people killed on site, in reality they are bodies brought to Murambi from throughout the surrounding area. Those killed at Murambi were buried in mass graves on site in 1996.

== See also ==
- Dark tourism
- List of massacres in Rwanda
