= Embassy of Rwanda, Paris =

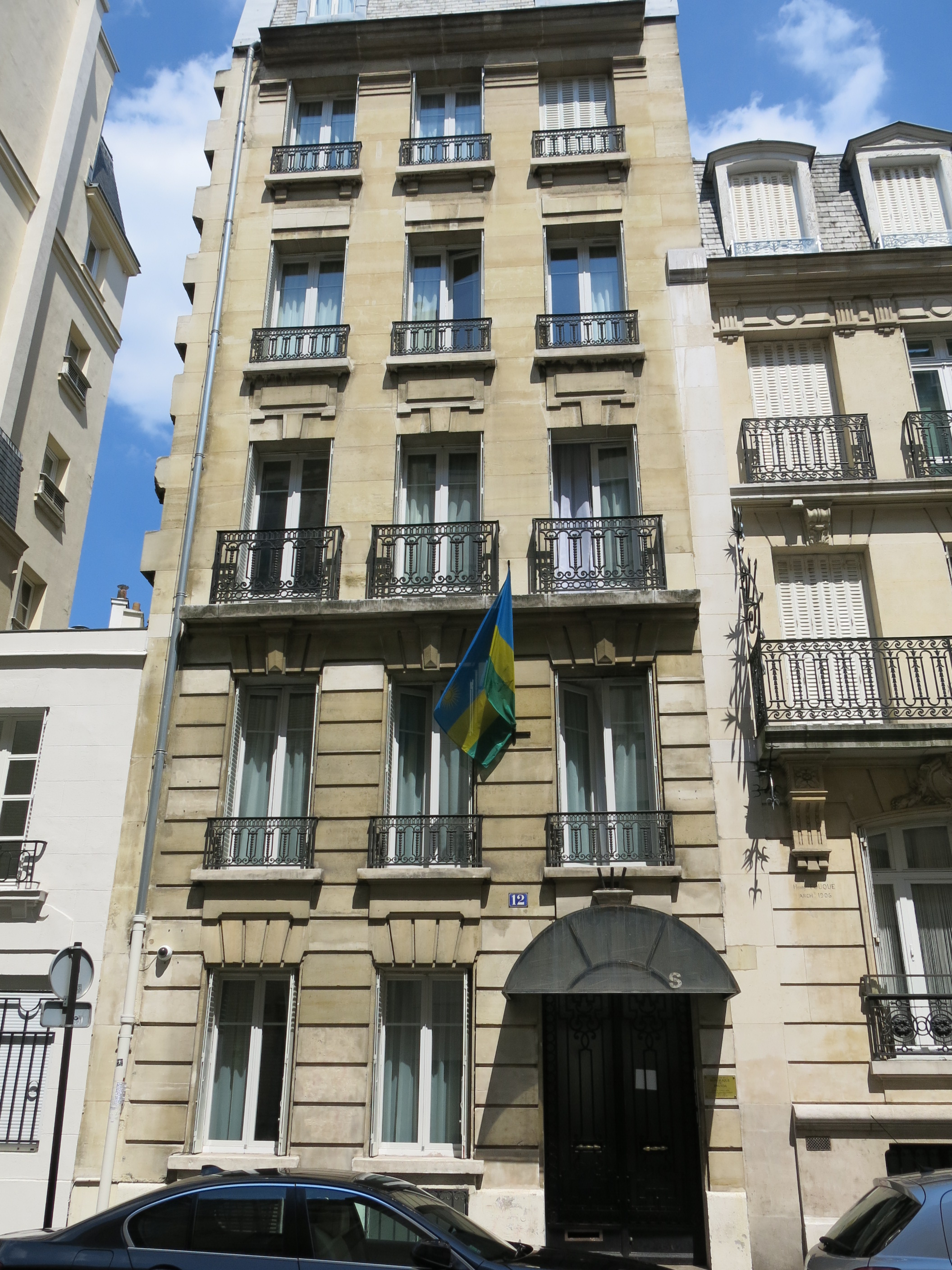
- Front of the embassy, 2015.
- Address: 30, Assomption Street, Paris
- Coordinates: 48.8539301°N 2.2723555°E
- Ambassador: François Nkulikiyimfura
- Website: rwandainfrance.gov.rw

The embassy of Rwanda in France is the diplomatic mission of Rwanda to France. It is located on 30, Assomption Street, in the 16th arrondissement of Paris. Since 2022, its ambassador has been François Nkulikiyimfura.

As well as its responsibilities in France, the embassy also has jurisdiction over Spain, Italy, Monaco and Portugal.

It also represents Rwanda in UNESCO, La Francophonie, the FAO, the WFP, the International Fund for Agricultural Development, UN Tourism and OECD.

Until 2024, the embassy was located on 12 Jadin Street, in the 17th arrondissement of Paris.

== Ambassadors of Rwanda in France ==
Date of accreditation (issuance of letters of credence)	Ambassador
6 June 1964	Emmanuel Kaberuka
31 January 1967	Pierre Canisius Mudenge
28 October 1969	Célestin Kabanda
27 November 1972	Canisius Karake
9 October 1974	Jules Kananura
20 March 1980	Tharcisse Nyandwi
14 October 1982	Bonaventure Ubalijoro
31 May 1988	Denis Magira Bigilimana
6 December 1990	Jean-Marie Vianney Ndagijimana
7 March 1995	Christophe Mfizi
22 October 2001	Jacques Bihozagara
11 January 2005	Emmanuel Ndagijimana
Break in diplomatic relations (2006-2009)
2 July 2010	Jacques Kabalé
10 December 2019	François-Xavier Ngarambe
22 July 2022	François Nkulikiyimfura

[[Fichier:Jacques_Kabalé-Festival_international_de_géographie_2011_(3).jpg|center|thumb|Ambassador Jacques Kabalé (2nd right) unveils an Imigongo mural in Saint-Dié-des-Vosges as part of the 22nd International Festival of Geography (October 2011)]]

== Consulate ==
Rwanda does not have any consulates other than the consulate in its embassy in Paris.

== See also ==
=== Related articles ===
- Ministry of Foreign Affairs and Cooperation (Rwanda)
- List of diplomatic missions of Rwanda
- Embassy of France to Rwanda
- France–Rwanda relations
