= Foreign relations of Rwanda =

Rwanda has diplomatic relations with most member countries of the United Nations and with the Holy See.

== Accepting refugees ==
Rwanda has accepted tens of thousands of refugees from neighboring African countries including Burundi, the Democratic Republic of Congo, Eritrea, Somalia and South Sudan. It has also accepted hundreds of African refugees from Israel and Afghan schoolgirls.

As of 2015, Rwanda hosted 75,000 Burundian refugees according to UNHCR. When credible reports surfaced that Rwanda recruited and trained Burundi refugees including children to remove Burundian President Nkurunziza, Rwanda announced to relocate Burundian refugees to third countries.

Since September 2019, Rwanda has also taken in Libyan refugees and asylum-seekers, operating a refugee center at Gashora, Rwanda, which houses up to 700 refugees from eight African countries (Eritrea, Sudan, South Sudan, Somalia, Ethiopia, Nigeria, Chad and Cameroon) and is financed by UNHCR until 31 December 2023.

In 2021 Denmark signed a deal to establish an asylum center in Kigali, and since April 2022, the UK has sought to shift its asylum responsibilities, considering Rwanda a safe third country by offering 120 million pounds in economic development programs in return for accepting refugees.

== Diplomatic relations ==
List of countries which Rwanda maintains diplomatic relations with:

#	Country	Date
1	France	1 July 1962
2	Israel	1 July 1962
3	Japan	1 July 1962
4	United Kingdom	1 July 1962
5	United States	1 July 1962
6	Belgium	18 July 1962
7	Pakistan	July 1962
8	Uganda	18 December 1962
9	Germany	13 February 1963
10	South Korea	21 March 1963
11	Denmark	2 April 1963
12	Russia	17 October 1963
13	Switzerland	12 November 1963
—	Holy See	6 June 1964
14	Netherlands	1 October 1964
15	Luxembourg	27 October 1964
16	Sweden	1964
17	Tanzania	7 January 1965
18	Colombia	22 February 1965
19	Italy	5 May 1965
20	Kenya	11 June 1965
21	Poland	10 July 1965
22	Romania	15 July 1965
23	Czech Republic	24 July 1965
24	Austria	14 September 1965
25	Canada	23 November 1965
26	Ghana	1965
—	Democratic Republic of the Congo (suspended)	August 1966
27	Ethiopia	26 October 1966
28	Spain	16 June 1967
29	Guinea	28 June 1967
30	India	1967
31	Burundi	April 1969
32	Norway	30 January 1971
33	Senegal	9 February 1971
34	Egypt	10 February 1971
35	Syria	10 February 1971
36	Serbia	15 June 1971
37	China	12 November 1971
38	Tunisia	1971
39	North Korea	22 April 1972
40	Nigeria	10 June 1972
41	Hungary	31 July 1972
42	Chad	9 December 1972
43	Zambia	January 1973
44	Greece	1 February 1973
45	Cameroon	11 March 1974
46	Ivory Coast	15 March 1974
47	Libya	10 May 1974
48	Argentina	8 January 1975
49	Burkina Faso	26 November 1975
50	Vietnam	30 September 1975
51	Algeria	25 November 1975
52	Niger	1975
53	Mexico	21 January 1976
54	Portugal	12 February 1976
55	Mozambique	17 April 1976
56	Gabon	1976
57	Cuba	6 September 1979
58	Bulgaria	20 December 1979
59	Turkey	18 February 1980
60	Djibouti	3 April 1980
61	Brazil	20 January 1981
62	Venezuela	18 August 1981
63	Republic of the Congo	17 August 1982
64	Philippines	15 December 1982
65	Finland	1 June 1983
66	Lesotho	1983
67	Bangladesh	13 January 1984
68	Indonesia	16 January 1984
69	Benin	8 March 1985
70	Mauritania	27 April 1985
71	Iran	October 1985
72	Mali	6 January 1987
73	Thailand	30 October 1987
74	Angola	20 December 1988
75	Cyprus	31 March 1990
76	Namibia	21 December 1990
77	Chile	20 September 1991
78	Slovakia	1 January 1993
79	Ukraine	8 September 1993
80	South Africa	6 May 1995
81	United Arab Emirates	1995
82	North Macedonia	18 April 1996
83	Ireland	April 1997
84	Bahrain	2 March 1998
85	Oman	March 1998
86	Jamaica	6 November 1998
87	Zimbabwe	7 October 1999
88	Costa Rica	8 March 2001
89	Mauritius	16 March 2001
90	Malawi	26 June 2001
91	Belarus	25 February 2002
92	Sudan	15 October 2003
93	Armenia	29 March 2004
94	Iceland	12 May 2004
95	Azerbaijan	28 May 2004
96	Botswana	September 2004
97	Singapore	18 March 2005
98	Malaysia	1 August 2005
99	Cambodia	29 September 2005
100	Estonia	14 March 2006
101	Slovenia	8 December 2006
102	Latvia	10 April 2007
103	Australia	9 May 2007
104	Morocco	21 June 2007
105	Uruguay	16 June 2009
106	Laos	31 August 2009
107	Equatorial Guinea	29 July 2010
108	Seychelles	5 October 2010
109	Georgia	23 March 2011
110	Sri Lanka	20 April 2011
111	New Zealand	17 April 2012
112	Kazakhstan	10 May 2012
113	Somalia	18 October 2012
114	Lithuania	27 March 2013
115	Montenegro	12 April 2013
116	Kuwait	19 September 2013
117	Bosnia and Herzegovina	17 October 2013
118	South Sudan	21 October 2013
119	Mongolia	25 November 2013
120	Sierra Leone	29 November 2013
121	Monaco	10 April 2014
122	Gambia	15 July 2014
123	Eswatini	30 August 2014
124	Barbados	28 July 2015
125	Central African Republic	8 July 2016
126	Liechtenstein	11 November 2016
127	São Tomé and Príncipe	11 January 2017
128	Togo	17 January 2017
129	Eritrea	18 April 2017
130	Lebanon	21 April 2017
131	Cape Verde	4 May 2017
132	Qatar	4 May 2017
133	Liberia	16 May 2017
134	Jordan	4 June 2017
135	Peru	7 December 2017
136	Madagascar	17 January 2018
137	Croatia	15 February 2018
138	Saudi Arabia	29 March 2018
139	Malta	12 July 2018
140	Nepal	20 July 2018
141	Tajikistan	30 July 2018
142	Haiti	15 August 2018
143	Vanuatu	3 October 2018
144	Andorra	14 November 2018
145	Saint Kitts and Nevis	15 February 2019
146	Saint Lucia	28 August 2019
147	Maldives	6 September 2019
148	Suriname	14 October 2019
149	Ecuador	17 October 2019
150	Nicaragua	8 November 2019
151	Antigua and Barbuda	10 December 2019
152	Belize	22 January 2020
153	Brunei	9 December 2020
154	Grenada	3 March 2021
155	Dominica	15 April 2021
156	Guinea-Bissau	27 April 2021
157	Bolivia	21 September 2021
158	Saint Vincent and the Grenadines	9 November 2021
159	Trinidad and Tobago	26 May 2022
160	Bahamas	16 June 2022
161	Guyana	24 August 2022
162	Dominican Republic	23 September 2022
163	Kyrgyzstan	13 December 2022
164	Tonga	21 March 2023
165	Paraguay	18 April 2023
166	El Salvador	18 September 2023
167	Panama	18 September 2023
168	Moldova	25 January 2024
169	Solomon Islands	23 September 2024
170	Guatemala	24 September 2024
171	Marshall Islands	25 September 2024
172	Samoa	23 October 2024
173	Comoros	5 July 2025
174	Turkmenistan	14 July 2025
175	Uzbekistan	18 April 2026
—	Sahrawi Arab Democratic Republic	Unknown

== Bilateral relations ==
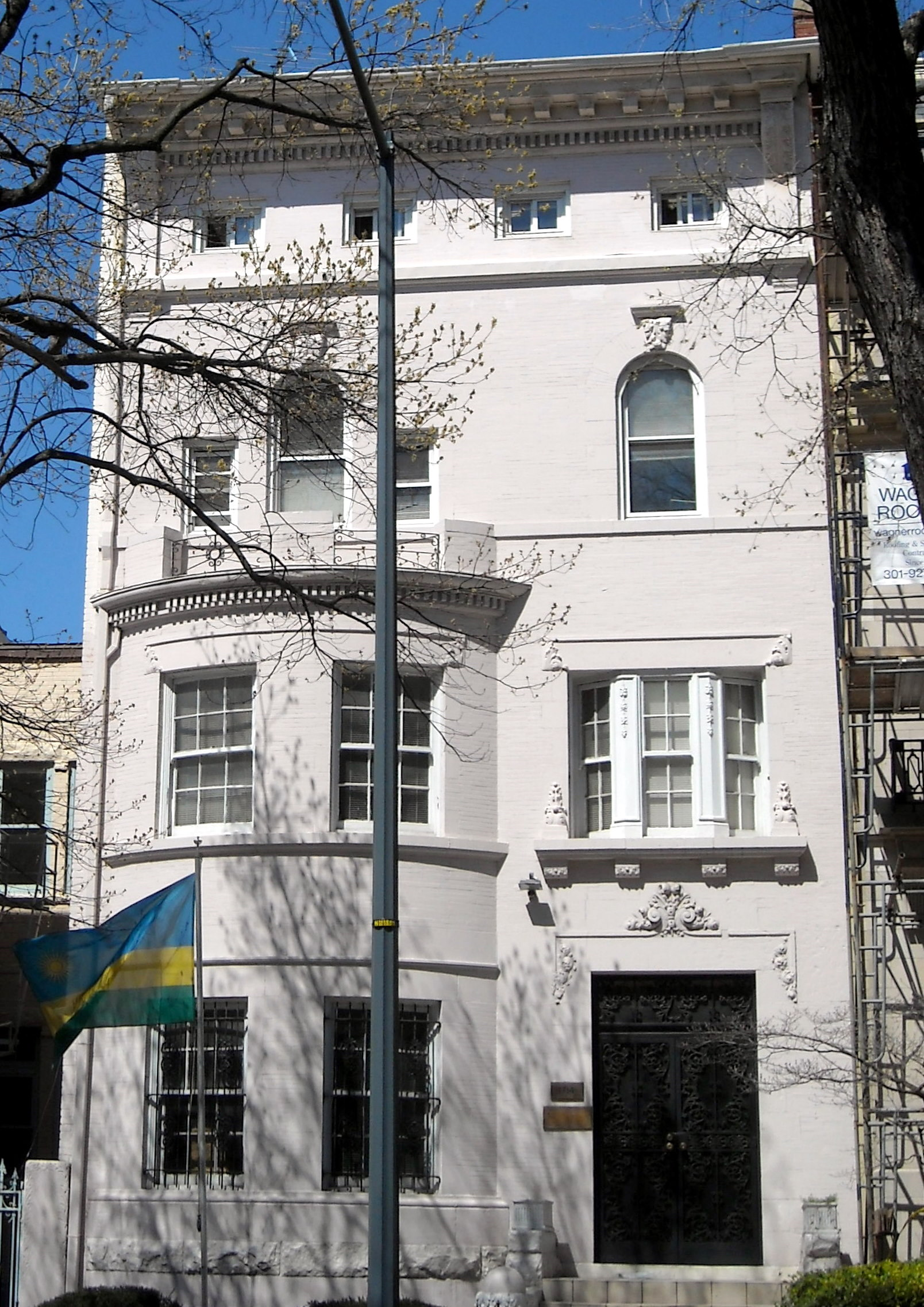
Embassy of Rwanda in Washington, D.C.

Several west European and African nations, Canada, People's Republic of China, Egypt, Libya, Russia, the Holy See, and the European Union maintain diplomatic missions in Kigali.

Country	Notes
Australia	Both countries established diplomatic relations in 2007: Rwanda is accredited to Australia through its High Commission in Singapore, Rwanda also has an Honorary Consul based in Melbourne.; Australia is represented in Rwanda through its High Commission in Nairobi, Kenya.
Bangladesh	See Bangladesh–Rwanda relations Both countries established diplomatic relations on 12 January 1984 In 1994 Bangladesh provided roughly 900 peace-keeping troops, including soldiers and medical personnel, to Rwanda to aid in keeping the peace during the Rwandan genocide, one of more than 40 countries to do so.
Belgium	See Belgium-Rwanda relations Belgium was the colonial power, administering the League of Nations mandate in Ruanda Urundi from 1922 until their independence in 1962. See Ruanda-Urundi. During the 1994 Genocide, 10 Belgian Peacekeepers were murdered while trying to protect then-Prime Minister Agathe Uwilingiyimana.: Belgium has an embassy in Kigali.; Rwanda has an embassy in Brussels.
Burundi	Main article: Burundi–Rwanda relations Burundi and Rwanda have always had diplomatic relations as the two were very closed linked kingdoms and their political relations can date back to the year 1091, when the Kingdom of Rwanda was founded, the two kingdoms always had close relationships and even political alliances between the two monarchies. In the modern era, the two states dispute sections of border on the Akanyaru and the Kagera/Nyabarongo rivers, which have changed course since the 1960s, when the boundary was delimited; cross-border conflicts among Tutsi, Hutu, other ethnic groups, associated political rebels, armed gangs, and various government forces persist in the Great Lakes region.: Burundi has an embassy in Kigali.; Rwanda has an embassy in Bujumbura.
China	See China–Rwanda relations China and Rwanda established diplomatic relations on 12 November 1971.: China has an embassy in Kigali.; Rwanda has an embassy in Beijing.
Democratic Republic of the Congo	Main article: Democratic Republic of the Congo–Rwanda relations In 1996, Rwandan forces invaded Democratic Republic of the Congo (then Zaire), leading to the replacement of the Congolese president, Mobutu Sese Seko with Laurent-Désiré Kabila. In 1998, Rwanda, along with Uganda, invaded DRC to back rebels trying to overthrow Kabila. After the Lusaka Ceasefire Agreement of 1999, Rwandan troops pulled back. On 6 August 2009, Rwandan President Paul Kagame met with the Democratic Republic of the Congo's President Joseph Kabila in Goma. It was the first presidential meeting between the two countries for 13 years. The presidents "reviewed all issues of common interest", with Kabila referred to it as "the first giant step forward" in an "all new era". One month previous to the meeting both countries had appointed ambassadors to each other's capitals. Since the 2010s, the DRC has accused Rwanda of supporting the M23 movement in the Kivu region, which Rwanda denies. In January 2025, the DRC severed diplomatic ties with Rwanda amidst the M23 campaign and ongoing Democratic Republic of the Congo–Rwanda conflict.
Denmark	See Denmark–Rwanda relations: Denmark has an embassy in Kigali.; Rwanda is accredited to Denmark from its embassy in Stockholm, Sweden.
France	See France–Rwanda relations As a result of French complicity before, during and after the genocide, with the genocidaires (that is, those who committed the genocide), Rwanda cut off relations with France at the end of the war, and replaced French with English as an official language. Relations were resumed in November 2009. Nicolas Sarkozy visited Kigali in February 2010. in 2016, A French court ordered the re-opening of the case investigating the fatal plane crash that killed Rwandan president Juvénal Habyarimana in 1994. The move angered administration in Ghana. The National Commission for the Fight Against Genocide (CNLG) issued the names of French military 22 officers requested for depositions. The officers were station in France during the 1994 Turquoise safe zone operation.
Germany	See Germany–Rwanda relations Both countries established diplomatic relations on 13 February 1963
India	See India–Rwanda relations: India is represented in Rwanda through its High Commission in Kigali.; Rwanda has its embassy in New Delhi.
Israel	See Israel-Rwanda relations In 1962, Israel was the second country to recognize Rwanda's independence. In 1973 the relations were severed and restored in October 1994 after the Rwandan genocide.: Israel has an embassy in Kigali from 2019.; Rwanda has an embassy in Tel Aviv from 2015.
Japan	Embassy of Japan in Kigali established in 2010; Rwasat launched by Japanese Space Agency
Kenya	Both countries established diplomatic relations on 11 June 1965 See Kenya-Rwanda Relations: Kenya has a High Commission in Kigali; Rwanda has a High Commission in Nairobi
Mexico	Both countries established diplomatic relations on 21 January 1976: Mexico is accredited to Rwanda from its embassy in Nairobi, Kenya and maintains an honorary consulate in Kigali.; Rwanda is accredited to Mexico from its embassy in Washington, D.C., United States.
Netherlands	The Embassy of the Republic of Rwanda was established in the Kingdom of the Netherlands in The Hague on the 1st of November 2006
North Korea	See North Korea–Rwanda relations
Singapore	The High Commission of the Republic of Rwanda in Singapore was officially opened in 2008: Singapore is accredited to Rwanda through a non-resident high commissioner based in Singapore.; Rwanda has a high commission in Singapore.
South Korea	22 August 1972 opened Embassy Republic of Korea in Rwanda, but closed 31 May 1975, reopened 11 September 1987, the embassy was closed again 30 November 1990 and reopened 30 December 2011. Rwanda opened its embassy in Seoul 30 March 2009: Establishment of Diplomatic Relations between the Republic of Korea (South Korea) and the Republic of Rwanda is 21 March 1963.
Spain	See Rwanda–Spain relations: Rwanda is accredited to Spain from its embassy in Paris, France.; Spain is accredited to Rwanda from its embassy in Dar es Salaam, Tanzania.
Tanzania	See Rwanda-Tanzania relations Both countries established diplomatic relations on 7 January 1965 when accredited first Ambassador of Rwanda to Tanzania (resident in Kampala) Mr. Musabyimana Malachie
Turkey	See Rwanda–Turkey relations: Rwanda has an embassy in Ankara.; Turkey has an embassy in Kigali.; Trade volume between the two countries was 32.4 million USD in 2019 (Rwandan exports/imports: 0.2/32.2 million USD).
United Arab Emirates	UAE Embassy in Kigali opened its temporary premises in March 2018 and was relocated to its current premises in April 2019: Rwanda has an embassy in the UAE; Trade volume stood at $434.8 million in 2018
United Kingdom	See Rwanda–United Kingdom relations Rwanda established diplomatic relations with the United Kingdom on 1 July 1962.: Rwanda maintains a high commission in London.; The United Kingdom is accredited to Rwanda through its high commission in Kigali.; Both countries share common membership of the Commonwealth, and the World Trade Organization. Bilaterally the two countries have a Development Partnership.
United States	See Rwanda–United States relations: Rwanda has an embassy in Washington, D.C.; the United States has an embassy in Kigali.

== See also ==
- List of diplomatic missions in Rwanda
- List of diplomatic missions of Rwanda
