= French Institute of Rwanda =

French cultural centre in Kigali, Rwanda

- Institut français du Rwanda
- Logo of the institute.
- Founded: 2011; 15 years ago
- Headquarters: 3, KN 33, Kiyovu
- Coordinates: 1.948611°S 30.066667°E
- Region served: Rwanda
- Parent organization: Institut Français
- Website: if.rwanda.org

The French institute of Rwanda is part of the global network of French institutes abroad. Since May 2021, it can be found in Rugando-Kimihurura in Kigali, the capital of the country.

== History ==
Created in 2010 under the name "French Cultural Centre of Rwanda (Note: French: Centre culturel français du Rwanda)", then "Franco-Rwandan cultural exchange centre (Note: French: Centre d'échanges culturels franco-rwandais)", it was renamed to the French Institute of Rwanda in the wake of a worldwide reform of the cultural network and the cooperation of the Ministry for Europe and Foreign Affairs initiated by the law of 27 July 2010, replacing the French cultural activities which were previously brought together with the organisation Culturesfrance.

This reorganisation has brought about greater unity and more simplicity in management. The departments for university, educational, linguistic and cutural cooperation of the Embassy of France were merged to form the French Institute of Rwanda.They maintain close ties with the Consulate General in the country.

Complex and often difficult diplomatic relations between France and Rwanda compelled the French Institute to operate "outside its walls" with its main office in the French emabssy and its media library, on the first floor of the Municipal Library of Kigali. After a thaw in diplomatic relations between Rwanda and France, the French Institute of Rwanda opened a centre on 27 May, 2021, in the presence of the French president Emmanuel Macron.

On 2 July, 2014, the mayor of Kigali issued a demolition order against the French Institue building after issuing an eviction order to its owners a few months earlier. At the time, the French Institute housed the city's only library open to the public, the only cinema and the only major performance venue (with 500 seats). It was near the main intersection of the city, Place de L'Unité nationale, between the Hôtel des Mille Collines and the Sainte-Famille Church.

Since May of 2021, the French Institue of Rwanda has been based in its new, 4000m² centre in Rugando-Kimihrura.

== Role in education ==
The main goal of the Institute is to offer French courses, examinations and training programs to as broad an audience as possible. As a result, the Institute has hundreds of students; children, university students and professionals. The IFR is also accredited to administer and deliver different international certifications: DELF, DALF, TCF, DELF Prim, DELF Junior and TCF Quebec.

== Cultural activities ==
The cultural center of the Institute participates in the local cultural scene by creating annual events with a scope ranging from local to regional and national. The IFR also participates in external events in its mission to promote culture and exchanges between France and Rwanda. It also actively develops partenerships with other governmental and non-govenmental organisations, particularly to host events that require using its facilities (such as Franco-Belgian cooperation for language training, Franco-German cooperation for cultural events, and Franco-American cooperation for scientific events)

== See also ==
- École Françophone Antoine de Saint-Exupéry (Kigali)
- Embassy of France to Rwanda
