= Rwanda–United Kingdom relations =

- Rwanda: United Kingdom

Diplomatic mission
- High Commission of Rwanda, London: High Commission of the United Kingdom, Kigali

Rwanda–United Kingdom relations refer to the bilateral relations between Rwanda and the United Kingdom. The two countries established diplomatic relations on 1 July 1962.

Both countries share common membership of the Commonwealth, and the World Trade Organization. Bilaterally the two countries have a Development Partnership.

== History ==
=== Colonial era ===
The German Empire ruled Ruanda-Urundi until losing World War I in 1916, when it had to give up its colonies. At the 1919 Paris Peace Conference, Britain intended to take all of German East Africa including Ruanda-Urundi, but the Orts-Milner agreement granted Ruanda-Urundi to Belgium instead. Britain did acquire the Kigezi District of northwestern Rwanda, absorbing it into Uganda.

Britain, while not directly interested in Rwanda, was engaged due to its borders with resource-rich Uganda and DRC. From the early 1990s, the UK supported the formation and goals of the Rwandan Patriotic Front (RPF) to topple the Francophone government of Juvénal Habyarimana in Rwanda. The RPF had contact with British intelligence, and they received military training from British and US forces in the military base in Jinja, Uganda.

=== Rwanda genocide ===
In 1993 NGOs warned of potential violence in Rwanda. As a permanent member of the UN Security Council, Britain played a key role in decisions to withdraw most of the UN peacekeeping troops from Rwanda in April 1994 after the genocide began, as British UN Ambassador Hannay argued that UNAMIR could have a similar fate as the failure in Somalia six months earlier, and proposed to reduce the operation.

On 31 May the Secretary-General declared what had occurred in Rwanda constituted genocide. There was pressure on UNSC members to strengthen UNAMIR. However, Britain ambassador argued against intervention and saying it was "an African problem that required an African solution". The strengthened UN force was not deployed until over three months after authorization, due to UNSC members failing to provide resources.

== Development and Economic relations ==
=== Development and International aid ===
Since 1994 the UK has provided significant aid, military and strategic support to Rwanda, despite concerns of the country committing human rights abuses and crimes in the Democratic Republic of Congo (DRC) with the goal of exploiting the DRC's mineral resources.

There are questions around whether UK foreign policy towards Rwanda is compatible with legal obligations, as it has been shown complicit in Rwanda crimes, and motivated by maintaining power status and economic interests.

In 2025 Rwanda claimed that criticism towards English association football club Arsenal, and their sponsorship with Visit Rwanda, was a danger towards Rwandan peace and stabilization.

Rwanda has criticized the UK's decision to impose sanctions and pause some bilateral aid over Kigali’s alleged support for the M23 rebel group in the Democratic Republic of the Congo. The UK said sanctions would remain until Rwanda withdrew its troops from DRC, though Kigali denied providing military support to M23. The UK’s actions included suspending defence training, reviewing export licenses, and limiting diplomatic engagement. US sanctions also targeted Rwandan officials, including the Minister of State for Regional Integration James Kabarebe, for alleged ties to M23.

=== Rwanda asylum plan ===
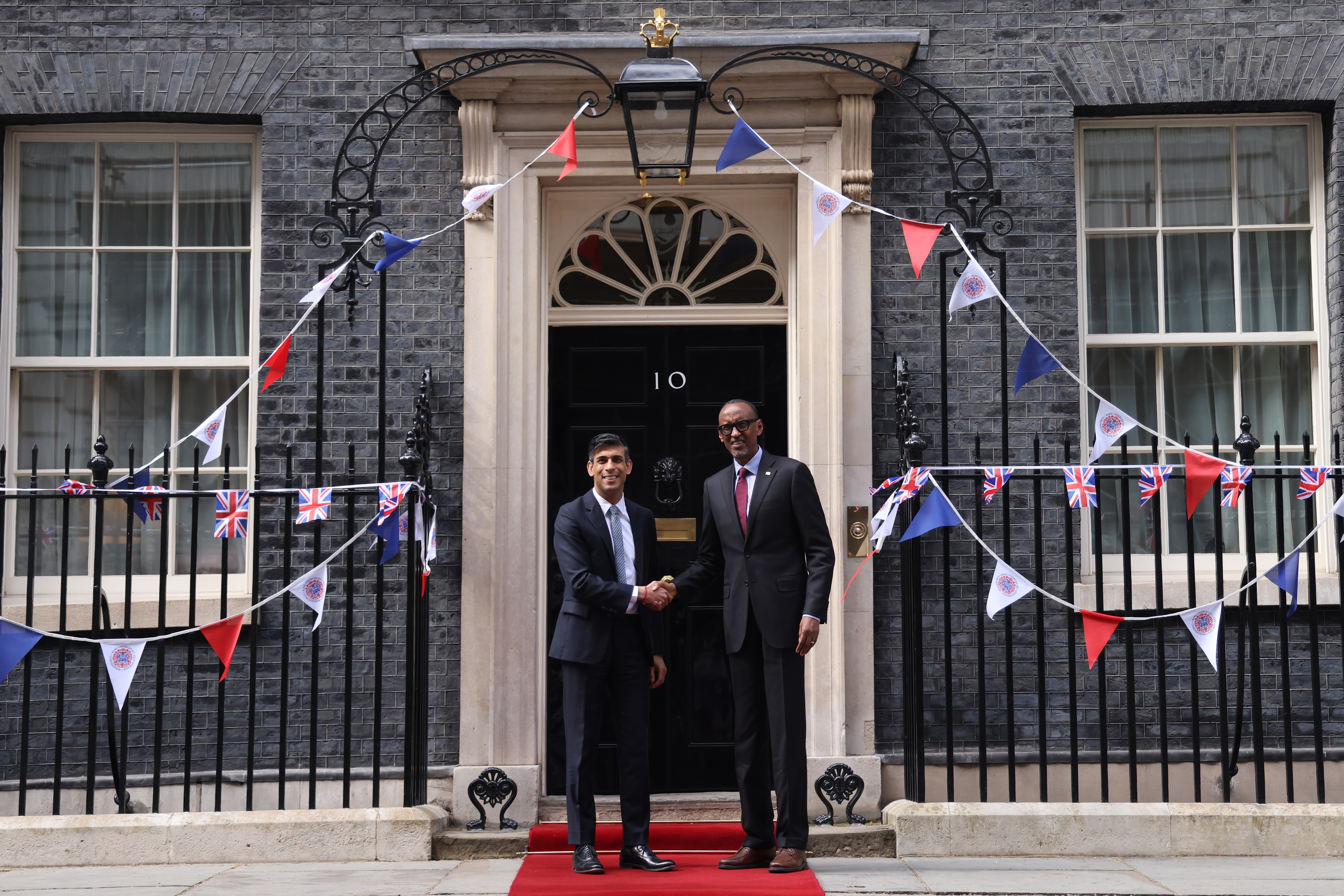
Rishi Sunak and Paul Kagame in 2023.

The UK and Rwanda Migration and Economic Development Partnership, also known as the Rwanda asylum plan, was a policy that was announced in a speech in 2022 by British prime minister Boris Johnson. It was to have been an immigration policy whereby people identified by the United Kingdom as being illegal immigrants or asylum seekers would be relocated to Rwanda for processing, asylum and resettlement. It was enacted for a duration of five years by British home secretary Priti Patel and Rwandan foreign minister Vincent Biruta on 13 April 2022. However, a series of legal challenges repeatedly delayed the implementation, and following the 2024 general election, in which the governing Conservative Party lost in a landslide to the Labour party, the plan was cancelled by new Prime Minister Keir Starmer. In 2026, the Permanent Court of Arbitration ruled that the UK didn't have to pay Rwanda £100 million related to Rwanda deal.

=== Economic relations ===
As a member of the East African Community, Article 143 gives Rwanda the legal right to make an accession request to join the UK–Kenya Economic Partnership Agreement - a free trade agreement between Kenya and the United Kingdom.

== Diplomatic relations ==
- Rwanda maintains a high commission in London.
- The United Kingdom is accredited to Rwanda through its high commission in Kigali.

== See also ==
- List of ambassadors of the United Kingdom to Rwanda
- Foreign relations of the United Kingdom
- Foreign relations of Rwanda
