= List of diplomatic missions in Rwanda =

This is a list of diplomatic missions in Rwanda. The capital Kigali currently hosts 45 embassies and high commissions.

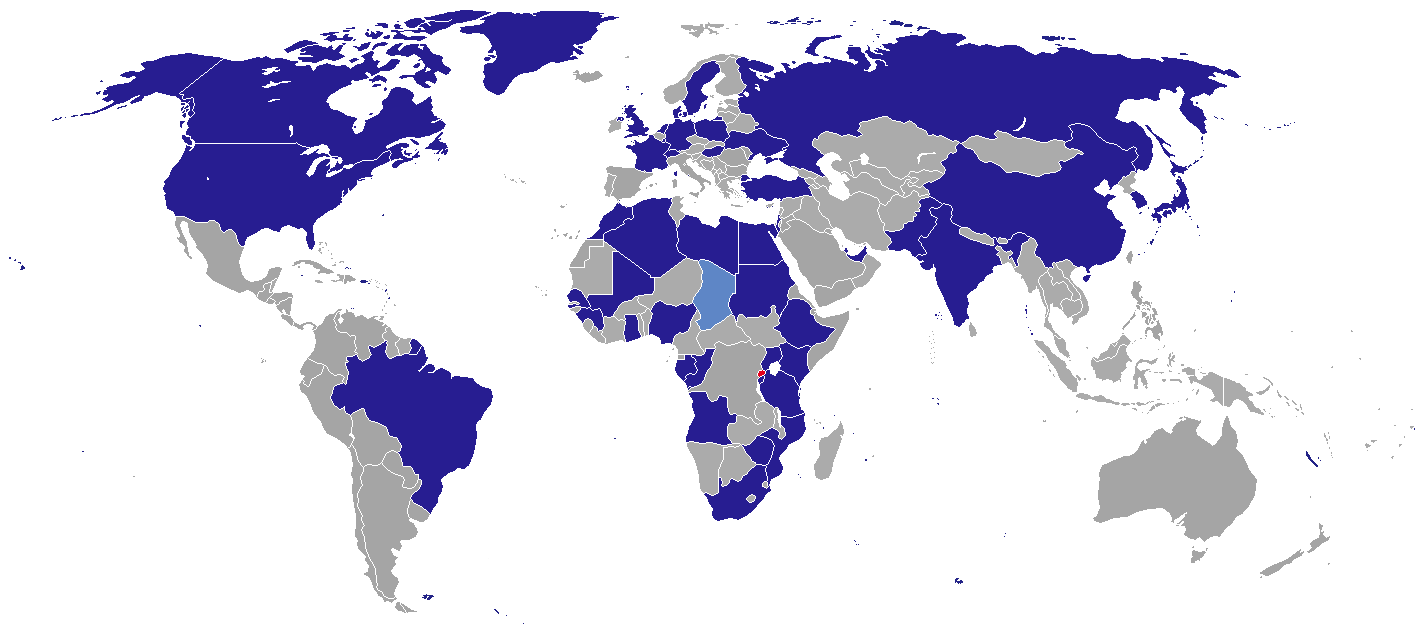
Map of diplomatic missions in Rwanda

== Diplomatic missions in Kigali ==
=== Embassies and High Commissions ===
Entries marked with an asterisk (*) are member-states of the Commonwealth of Nations. As such, their embassies are formally termed as "high commissions".

1. Algeria
2. Angola
3. Brazil
4. Burundi
5. Canada*
6. China
7. Congo-Brazzaville
8. Denmark*
9. Egypt
10. Ethiopia
11. France
12. Germany
13. Gabon*
14. Ghana*
15. Guinea
16. Holy See
17. India*
18. Israel
19. Japan
20. Kenya*
21. Libya
22. Luxembourg
23. Mali
24. Morocco
25. Mozambique*
26. Netherlands
27. Nigeria*
28. Pakistan*
29. Poland
30. Qatar
31. Russia
32. South Africa*
33. South Korea
34. Senegal
35. Sudan
36. Sweden
37. Switzerland
38. Tanzania*
39. Turkey
40. Uganda*
41. Ukraine
42. United Arab Emirates
43. United Kingdom*
44. United States
45. Zimbabwe

=== Other missions or delegations ===
1. European Union (Delegation)
2. Hungary (Embassy office)

== Consulate-general in Kigali ==
1. Chad

== Non-resident embassies accredited to Rwanda ==
=== Resident in Addis Ababa, Ethiopia ===
1. Armenia
2. Azerbaijan
3. Benin
4. Djibouti
5. Gambia
6. Georgia
7. Guinea-Bissau
8. Lesotho
9. Mauritania
10. New Zealand
11. Niger
12. Portugal

=== Resident in Dar es Salaam, Tanzania ===
1. Finland
2. Indonesia
3. Malawi
4. Namibia
5. Norway
6. Somalia
7. Spain
8. Vietnam
9. Zambia

=== Resident in Kampala, Uganda ===
1. Cuba
2. Iran
3. Ireland
4. Italy
5. Saudi Arabia
6. South Sudan
7. Sahrawi Republic
8. Venezuela

=== Resident in Kinshasa, Congo-Kinshasa ===
1. Cameroon
2. Ivory Coast
3. Togo

=== Resident in Nairobi, Kenya ===
1. Argentina
2. Australia
3. Austria
4. Bangladesh
5. Barbados
6. Botswana
7. Burkina Faso
8. Chile
9. Colombia
10. Czechia
11. Greece
12. Hungary
13. Jordan
14. Kazakhstan
15. Kuwait
16. Malaysia
17. Mexico
18. Oman
19. Philippines
20. Romania
21. Serbia
22. Sierra Leone
23. Slovakia
24. Sri Lanka
25. Thailand
26. Tunisia

=== Resident in Pretoria, South Africa ===
1. Croatia
2. Dominican Republic
3. Madagascar
4. Seychelles

=== Resident in other cities ===
1. Bahrain (Tunis)
2. Cambodia (Cairo)
3. Chad (Brazzaville)
4. Cyprus (Tel Aviv)
5. Equatorial Guinea (Brazzaville)
6. Eswatini (Maputo)
7. Jamaica (Abuja)
8. Malta (Valletta)
9. Nepal (Cairo)
10. Nicaragua (Harare)
11. Singapore (Singapore)

== Embassy to open ==
1. Oman

== See also ==
- Foreign relations of Rwanda
- List of diplomatic missions of Rwanda
- Visa requirements for Rwandan citizens
