= North Korea–Rwanda relations =

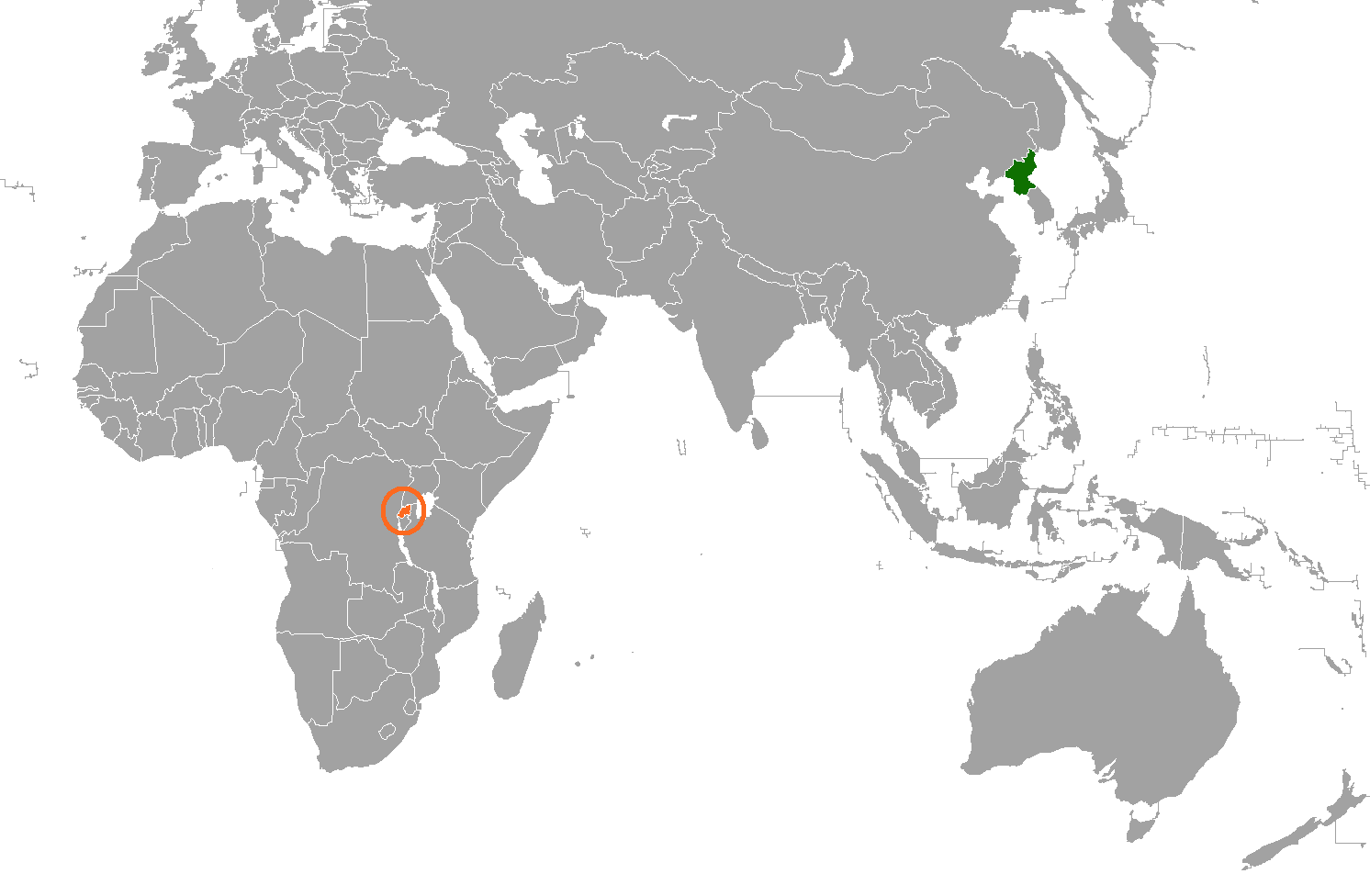

- North Korea: Rwanda

North Korea–Rwanda relations (Korean: 르완다-조선민주주의인민공화국 관계) refers to the current and historical relationship between North Korea and Rwanda. Neither country maintains an embassy in their respective capitals.

During the Cold War, most Rwandan governments were deeply anti-communist. Despite this, the Democratic People's Republic of Korea (DPRK, commonly known as North Korea) maintained friendly relations with the country, and provided developmental aid. One example of this is the deployment of a North Korean team in 1978 and 1979, to help start up Asian carp-based aquaculture in Rwanda.

Among the items featured in the International Friendship Exhibition, a museum hosting gifts presented by foreign dignitaries to Kim Il Sung and Kim Jong Il, are a large set of traditional Rwandan spears gifted by President Juvénal Habyarimana in June 1978.

Some members of the Rwandan Patriotic Front may have received military training in North Korea in the 1980s while serving in the Ugandan military, according to Ugandan press reports cited by Ogenga Otunnu.

Paul Kagame, a long-time rebel leader, eventually came to power in 2000. Following the 2010 presidential election in Rwanda, which saw a victory for Kagame with 93% of the vote, the North Korean government issued a communiqué congratulating the President on his victory.

Due to Rwanda's strong relations with South Korea, its relations with North Korea have been at a minimal and its trade, in accordance to UN sanctions on Korea.

== See also ==
- Foreign relations of North Korea
- Foreign relations of Rwanda
