= Embassy of France, Kigali =

Diplomatic mission of France in Rwanda

- Location: Député Kamuzinzi Street, Kigali
- Coordinates: 1.9486005°S 30.0667852°E
- Ambassador: Aurélie Royet-Gounin
- Website: rw.diplomatie.gouv.fr/en

The embassy of France to Rwanda is the diplomatic mission of France to Rwanda. It is located in Kigali, the capital of the country, and since September 2025 its ambassador has been Aurélie Royet-Gounin.

== Embassy ==
The embassy is located in Kigali. It also has a consulate and the French Institute of Rwanda.

== Ambassadors of France to Rwanda ==
From	To	Ambassador
1962	1964	Jean-Marc Barbey
1964	1967	Jean Fines
1967	1972	Jean-François Doudinot de La Boissière
1972	1976	Robert Picquet
1976	1980	Paul-Henry Manière
1980	1983	Jacques Leclerc
1983	1986	Robert Puissant
1986	1989	Pierre Bitard
1989	1993	Georges Martres
1993	1995	Jean-Michel Marlaud
1995	1998	Jacques Courbin
1998	2000	Jean-Claude Brochenin
2000	2004	François Ponge
2004	2006	Dominique Decherf
2006	2009	Break in diplomatic relations
2010	2012	Laurent Contini
2012	2015	Michel Flesch
2015	2021	Vacant
2021	2025	Antoine Anfré
2025	present	Aurélie Royet-Gounin

== Chargés d'affaires (2015-2021) ==
From	To	Chargé d'affaires
2015	2017	Xavier Verjus-Renard
2017	2019	Étienne de Souza
2019	2021	Jérémie Blin

== Diplomatic missions ==
France and Rwanda opened diplomatic relations in 1962, at the independence of the latter from the kingdom of Belgium.

On 24 November 2006, diplomatic missions were brokenn at the initiative of Rwanda as a result of the demands at the International Criminal Tribunal for Rwanda by the French judge Jean-Louis Bruguière at president Paul Kagame, and at the issuance of 9 arrest warrants for his close associates. This action was after the attack of 6 April 1994 at the then-president Juvénal Habyarimana and the genocide against the Tutsis. The embassy, as well as most French organisations present in Kenya, were closed.

On 29 November 2009, the 2 countries decided to reestablish their diplomatic relations. The French minister of Foreign Affairs, Bernard Kouchner, then the president of France, Nicolas Sarkozy, both travelled to Kigali to symbolise the normalisation of relations, 25 years after the last visit by a French head of state, François Mitterrand.

The poste of ambassador was vacant from 2006 to 2009 and from 2015 to 2021. The embassy was led by a chargé d'affaires during that time. In May 2021, during a warming of diplomatic relations, Emmanuel Macron announced the upcoming return of a French ambassador to Rwanda, which happened the following month.

== Consulate ==
=== French community ===
As of 31 December 2016, 365 French citizens were registered with the consular authorities in Kigali.

=== Electoral districts ===
Since the law of 22 July 2013 reformed the representation of French citizens living outside of France with the creations of consular councils in the diplomatic missions, the French citizens in a district containing Burundi, Kenya, Rwanda, Tanzania, Uganda, Zambia and Zimbabwe elect 3 consular councillors for a period of 6 years. They have 3 roles:

1. They are the locally based representatives of French citizens abroad;
2. They become part of one of 15 districts who elect among themselves the Assembly of French Citizens Abroad;
3. They become part of the electoral college which elects the senators of French citizens living abroad.

For the election to the Assembly of French Citizens abroad, until 2014, Rwanda was part of the electoral district of Nairobi, which also contained Burundi, Kenya, Tanzania and Uganda, and which accounted for 2 seats. Rwanda is currently part of the electoral district "Central, Eastern and Southern Africa" headquartered in Libreville and which elects 5 of its 27 consular councillors to serve as part of the 90 members of the Assembly of French Citizens Abroad.

For elections of legislative deputies representing French citizens abroad, Rwanda is in the 10th district.

== See also ==
=== Related articles ===
- École francophone Antoine de Saint-Exupéry
- Ministry for Europe and Foreign Affairs
- List of diplomatic missions of France

=== External links ===
- Embassy of France to Rwanda
- Minitsry for Europe and Foreign Affairs
