= Rwanda–Spain relations =

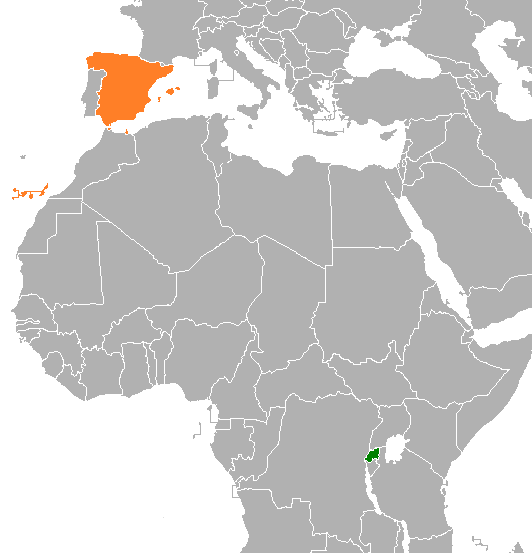
- Rwanda: Spain

Rwanda–Spain relations are the bilateral and diplomatic relations between these two countries. Rwanda does not have an embassy in Spain, however its embassy in Paris, France, is accredited to Spain and maintains an honorary consulate in Madrid. Spain does not have an embassy in Rwanda, however, its embassy in Dar es Salaam, Tanzania, is accredited to Rwanda and maintains an honorary consulate in Kigali.

== History ==
Rwanda and Spain established diplomatic relations in 1967.

In the aftermath of the 1994 Rwandan genocide, Spain sent 20 peacekeepers and a transport plane to support the logistics of the United Nations Assistance Mission for Rwanda.

In 2008, Spain's High Court sought the extradition of 40 Rwandan officers for their role in the genocide. While the proceedings started in response to the complaints raised by the families of 9 Spaniards who were killed, harmed or disappeared during the genocide, the indictment ended up covering crimes committed against Rwandan and Congolese victims between 1990 and 2002, and primarily against members of the Hutu ethnic group by former and current high-ranking military officials, which was made possible by universal jurisdiction legal doctrine. The Rwandan military dismissed the allegations as a smear campaign.

Spanish PM José Luis Rodríguez Zapatero, initially set to co-chair a United Nations meeting with Rwandan President Paul Kagame in Madrid in 2010, decided to withdraw due to the undergoing legal proceedings against the 40 Rwandan officers. Spain's NGOs and political parties also urged Zapatero not to meet with Kagame. He was replaced by Foreign Minister Miguel Ángel Moratinos for the duration of the meeting.

In June 2015, Karenzi Karake, head of Rwanda's intelligence services, was arrested in London following a European Arrest Warrant by Spain. Judge Fernando Andreu, in charge of the 2008 case, sought the extradition of Karake to Spain. In a tweet, Rwandan Minister of Foreign Affairs Louise Mushikiwabo accused Western countries of "degrading Africans" and sought explanations from the British government. Karake was finally released in August 2015, after a British court ruled that the British laws applicable to the case did not cover the actions of non-British citizens.

In October 2015, following the restriction of universal jurisdiction by Spain's parliament, the case against the 40 Rwandan officers was dismissed. However, 29 could still be prosecuted if they enter Spanish territory on terror charges.

In December 2020, Rwanda's Minister of Foreign Affairs Vincent Biruta and Spain's Arancha González Laya signed a memorandum of understanding to strengthen bilateral relations. In 2021, Spain named Rwanda as a country of economic interest in its Africa Strategy to 2023.

== Diplomatic relations ==
In 1994, Spain turned to the Rwandan people, highlighting the participation of Spanish troops in the Mission sent that year by the United Nations. It was also the first country that moved a team of forensics and prosecutors to the ground shortly after the genocide to collect evidence and testimonies that allowed to identify and prosecute those guilty of it. The voluminous result of this work, delivered to the UN in 1995, was very useful to initiate the causes of the International Criminal Tribunal for Rwanda. That same year, Spain organized from Nairobi an air bridge with two military planes in order to transfer international humanitarian aid to the hundreds of thousands of refugees installed in the Congolese camp in Goma, in which a Spanish directed the first battalion of Medical officers deployed there by the World Health Organization. It was also through the aid granted by Spain that the Kigali psychiatric hospital was rebuilt after the civil war, with funds provided by the Ministry of Health of the Junta de Andalucía.

== Economic relations ==
In 2012, Spanish exports to Rwanda amounted to 6.58 million euros. The main exported chapters consisted of: sounding devices (44.5% of the total); photovoltaic cells (20.4%); centrifugal pumps (0.9%); iron or steel bars (0.6%) and medical-surgical or laboratory sterilizers (0.3%). In 2013, until November, exports amounted to 1.7 million euros.

The Spanish importation of Rwanda in the same period was 0.49 million euros. The main chapters imported in 2012 were: coffee (75.3% of the total); juices and vegetable extracts (18.9%); nuts (3.5%); cathodic oscilloscopes and oscillographs (1.4%) and basketry articles (0.6%). In 2013, until November, imports amounted to 0.9 million euros and INDRA SISTEMAS and ISOFOTON are the main Spanish companies operating in Rwanda.

== Cooperation ==
Rwanda has not traditionally been a country of cooperation for Spain, nor is it on the list of priority countries of the Master Plan for Spanish Cooperation 2013–2016. The development cooperation that is carried out with Rwanda is done multilaterally.

In the 2006–2009 period, the Autonomous Communities dedicated a total of €5,282,360 to Rwanda as development aid, with Extremadura standing out (€603,000), Navarra (€1,060,000), Basque Country (€1,361,900) and C. Valenciana (€1,235,155). The rest are punctual and minor contributions from the Junta de Andalucía, Baleares, Aragón, Cataluña, Castilla-La Mancha and Castilla y León.

== See also ==
- Foreign relations of Rwanda
- Foreign relations of Spain
