= Victor Nkindi =

Rwandan media executive

- Born: Jean Victor Nkindi Nteziryayo; 13 January 1979 (age 47); Kigali, Rwanda
- Education: Robert Schuman University (Bachelor of Law, Political Science and Management- (Dropped out))
- Occupations: Business executive; Consultant
- Years active: 2006–present
- Employer: Hooza Media (2012–present)
- Notable work: Founder at Hooza Media; Board member at European Business Chamber of Rwanda.; Fondateur & Directeur Général at Hooza and Partners France.
- Website: https://www.hoozapartners.com

Jean Victor Nkindi Nteziryayo (commonly Victor Nkindi, born 13 January 1979), is a Rwandan media executive and social entrepreneur.

Nkindi is the founder of Hooza Media, a Rwandan convergent digital media company founded in 2012, which operates in many African countries such as Rwanda, D.R Congo, Burundi, Senegal, Cameroon, Kenya, Uganda, Botswana, Tanzania, Guinea, Ivory Coast and Mali. Nkindi, through Hooza Media, is known as the service provider of a 2-way audio channel low-tech news service in Rwanda and Africa accessible through feature phones, with no need for the internet. The technology was used during the 2017 Rwandan presidential elections, helping the Rwanda National Electoral Commission (NEC) to strengthen its awareness campaign for civic education.

Nkindi serves as a board Director at European Business Chamber of Rwanda (EBCR). He sits as vice chairman of board for Breast Cancer Initiative East Africa (BCIEA) since September 2022. Between 2007 and 2012, Nkindi served as station manager at Contact FM, a Rwanda based radio station.

== Early life and education ==
Victor Nkindi was born on 13 January 1979, raised in Beijing, China where he grew up during 8 years and attended the Lycée Français International Charles de Gaulle de Pékin, Beijing until 1988. His father, Jean Berchmans Nteziryayo, was a career diplomat who campaigned for and was elected to the Rwandan Parliament in 1988 before dying in January 1989. His mother, Quitterie Mukankusi, was appointed in Transitional National Assembly of Rwanda in December 1994 and served until her death in January 2002. Both parents died at the Nairobi Hospital and are buried side by side at their family home in Gicumbi District, Rwanda after official Government tributes. Victor Nkindi is the third of 5 siblings.

Nkindi studied secondary school education at École Francophone Antoine de Saint-Exupéry Kigali, Rwanda. and APE Rugunga Secondary School where he obtained his secondary school diploma. In 2000, he enrolled in Strasbourg University(Robert Schuman), France where he attended the Faculty of Law, Political Science and Management. In 2018, Victor Nkindi further enrolled in University of Helsinki, Finland for post-graduate certificates, he holds certificate for 2 ECTS in Artificial Intelligent.

== Career ==
From 2005 while staying in France, Victor Nkindi focused on his communication and managerial skills and prepared to return in Rwanda to work as an executive in the broadcast business. In 2006, he started working on a local radio station, Contact FM, as a program manager, where the radio hosted high personalities such as Paul Wolfowitz, Donald Kaberuka, Desmond Tutu and Paul Kagame, and famous artists like Alpha Blondy, Brick and Lace, P Square. In April 2007, Nkindi was promoted to become station manager of same institution. He served in this position until June 2012.

In July 2012 Nkindi partnered with Net Solutions, a Rwanda based technology company focuses on software engineering for mobile and web content. Net solutions is known as the first provider of Call Ringback tone service in Rwanda, licensing hundreds of local artists and generating royalties for the first time in Rwanda. Net Solution was also the provider of mobile voting platform used for the Rwanda music talent competition Primus Guma Guma Super Star and Miss Rwanda selection process. He served in this position until December 2015.

=== Hooza Media ===
In August 2012, Nkindi founded Hooza Ltd (known as its brand name Hooza Media), a Rwanda based convergent digital media company which operates in 17 African countries and Haiti. Nkindi and Hooza Media are popularly known for enhancing citizen engagement among rural populations of different African countries with a mobile solution. In 2016, they started a 2 way audio channel accessible through feature phones, with no need for the internet. The low tech Mobile Governance voice solution, awarded at the International Telecommunication Union (ITU) SME Virtual Digital World Awards in 2020, has the capacity to give 80% of populations in Rwanda and Africa an access to information, education and entertainment, beyond the barrier of internet access or illiteracy in local languages. This data driven technology was used during the 2017 Rwandan presidential elections, helping the National Electoral Commission (NEC) to strengthen its awareness campaign for civic education. and was exported to various African countries to support mass communication campaigns mainly for health and civic education campaigns.

Hooza Media is a global distribution partner for music copyright with The Orchard Enterprises, an American music and entertainment company, a subsidiary of Sony Music specializing in media distribution, based in New York City. Hooza Media is an active supporter of the music business in Africa where it has signed, promoted and monetized music artist with creative mobile, online and video broadcast technologies for innovative revenue streams.

In 2020, Nkindi also founded Hooza and Partners (H&P), a Rwandan strategic and information intelligence firm, which helps global corporate and institutional partners ensure a stable foundation for their assets and investments. The H&P combines advanced analytics, data mining, and intelligence gathering techniques to provide market research, competitor analysis, risk assessments, threat assessments, due diligence, and other types of intelligence gathering activities to help understand market trends in Rwanda and Africa.

=== Rotary International ===
Victor Nkindi served in different capacities in the Rotary Club of Kigali Gasabo Committee and as the President. For over 15 years, the club has been instrumental in supporting social and economic development in Rwanda such as building 10 houses Village in Gicumbi District benefiting families displaced by the May 2023 heavy floods in Rwanda.

== Social impact ==
Victor Nkindi serves in multiple executive and board mandates where his expertise helped thousands of social entrepreneurs in Rwanda and Africa, using mobile based technology he developed an inclusive approach for social and economic resilience for vulnerable rural populations impacted by the climate change, pandemics and civil wars.

Since 2015, Nkindi served as a mentor, business coach, trainer and international consultant for, Africa Entrepreneurship Award-Casablanca, Morocco; These Numbers Have Faces-Oregon, US; The Tony Elumelu Foundation- Lagos, Nigeria; Care International- Yaounde, Cameroon; OSIWA (Open Society Initiative for West Africa- Senegal & Ivory Coast; Open Innovation Program, Make IT Africa- Bonn, Germany; Media Impacting Communities- Kigali, Rwanda.

== Other considerations ==
Nkindi is a 2015 graduate of Tony Elumelu Entrepreneur Program (TEEP), with the company Hooza, they received $5000 seeds funds.

== See also ==
- École Francophone Antoine de Saint-Exupéry
