= List of diplomatic missions of Rwanda =

This is a list of diplomatic missions of Rwanda, excluding honorary consulates.

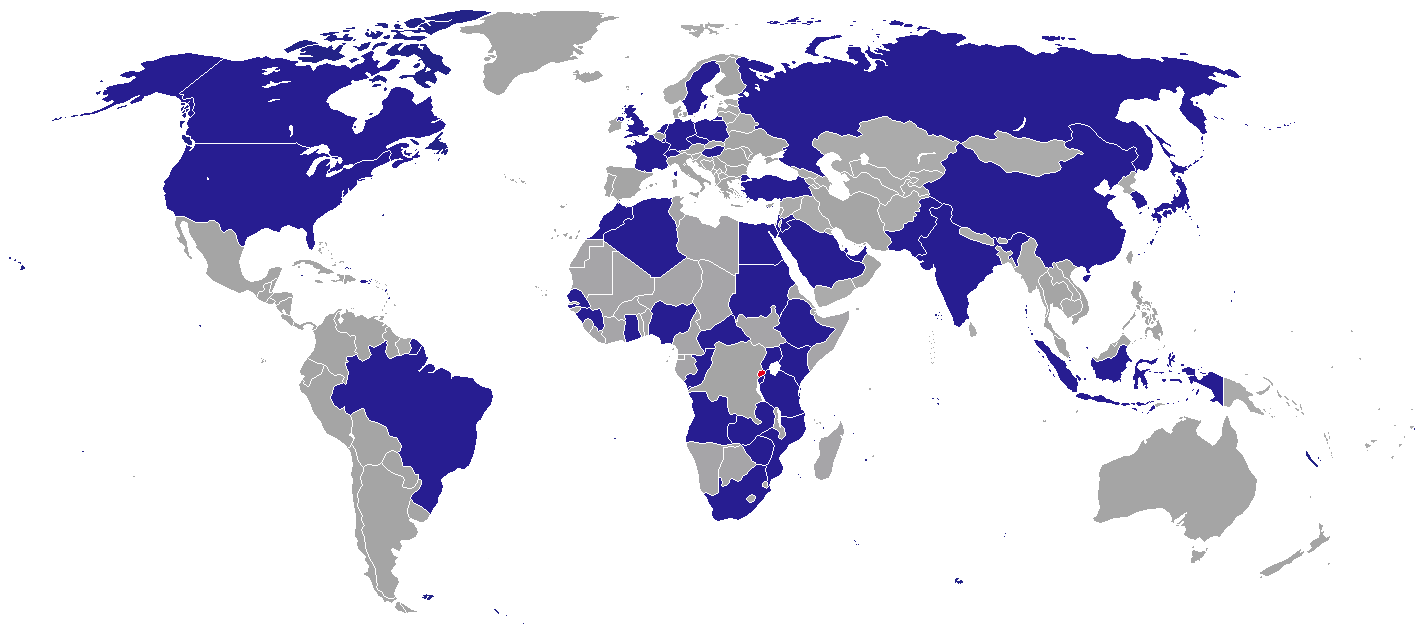
Rwandan diplomatic missions

== Current missions ==
=== Africa ===
Host country	Host city	Mission	Concurrent accreditation	Ref.
Algeria	Algiers	Embassy		
Angola	Luanda	Embassy		
Burundi	Bujumbura	Embassy		
Central African Republic	Bangui	Embassy		
Congo-Brazzaville	Brazzaville	Embassy	Countries: Cameroon; Equatorial Guinea; Gabon	
Egypt	Cairo	Embassy	Countries: Libya	
Ethiopia	Addis Ababa	Embassy	Countries: Djibouti; International Organizations: African Union; United Nations Economic Commission for Africa	
Ghana	Accra	High Commission	Countries: Benin; Ivory Coast; Liberia; Sierra Leone; Togo	
Guinea	Conakry	Embassy		
Kenya	Nairobi	High Commission	International Organizations: United Nations; United Nations Environment Programme; United Nations Human Settlements Programme	
Morocco	Rabat	Embassy	Countries: Mauritania; Tunisia	
Mozambique	Maputo	High Commission	Countries: Comoros; Eswatini	
Nigeria	Abuja	High Commission	Countries: Burkina Faso; Chad; Niger	
Senegal	Dakar	Embassy	Countries: Cape Verde; Guinea-Bissau; Gambia; Mali	
South Africa	Pretoria	High Commission	Countries: Lesotho; Madagascar; Mauritius; Namibia	
Sudan	Khartoum	Embassy		
Tanzania	Dar es Salaam	High Commission	Countries: Seychelles; International Organizations: East African Community	
Uganda	Kampala	High Commission		
Zambia	Lusaka	High Commission	Countries: Malawi	
Zimbabwe	Harare	Embassy	Countries: Botswana	

=== Americas ===
Host country	Host city	Mission	Concurrent accreditation	Ref.
Brazil	Brasília	Embassy		
Canada	Ottawa	High Commission	Countries: Cuba; Dominican Republic; Haiti; International Organizations: ICAO	
United States	Washington, D.C.	Embassy	Countries: Argentina; Mexico	

=== Asia ===
Host country	Host city	Mission	Concurrent accreditation	Ref.
China	Beijing	Embassy	Countries: North Korea; Vietnam	
India	New Delhi	High Commission	Countries: Bangladesh; Maldives; Nepal; Sri Lanka	
Indonesia	Jakarta	Embassy	Multilateral Organizations: Association of Southeast Asian Nations	
Israel	Tel Aviv	Embassy	Countries: Bulgaria; Cyprus; Greece	
Japan	Tokyo	Embassy	Countries: Malaysia; Philippines; Thailand	
Jordan	Amman	Embassy		
Pakistan	Islamabad	High Commission		
Qatar	Doha	Embassy	Countries: Kuwait	
Saudi Arabia	Riyadh	Embassy		
Singapore	Singapore	High Commission	Countries: Australia; Brunei; New Zealand	
South Korea	Seoul	Embassy	Countries: Cambodia; Laos	
Turkey	Ankara	Embassy	Countries: Azerbaijan; Kazakhstan; Lebanon	
United Arab Emirates	Abu Dhabi	Embassy	Countries: Bahrain	
United Arab Emirates	Dubai	Consulate-General	Countries: Bahrain	

=== Europe ===
Host country	Host city	Mission	Concurrent accreditation	Ref.
Czechia	Prague	Embassy		
France	Paris	Embassy	Countries: Italy; Monaco; Portugal; International Organizations: Food and Agriculture Organization; Francophonie; International Fund for Agricultural Development; OECD; UNESCO; World Food Programme; World Tourism Organization	
Germany	Berlin	Embassy	Countries: Romania; Slovakia; Ukraine	
Hungary	Budapest	Embassy		
Luxembourg	Luxembourg City	Embassy		
Netherlands	The Hague	Embassy	Countries: Estonia; Latvia; Lithuania; Belgium; International Organizations: International Court of Justice; OPCW; Permanent Court of Arbitration	
Poland	Warsaw	Embassy		
Russia	Moscow	Embassy	Countries: Armenia; Belarus	
Spain	Madrid	Embassy		
Sweden	Stockholm	Embassy	Countries: Denmark; Finland; Iceland; Norway	
United Kingdom	London	High Commission	Countries: Ireland; Malta	

=== Multilateral organizations ===
Organization	Host city	Host country	Mission	Concurrent accreditation	Ref.
United Nations	New York City	United States	Permanent Mission	Countries: Chile; Colombia; Guatemala; Jamaica; Venezuela	
United Nations	Geneva	Switzerland	Permanent Mission	Countries: Austria; Holy See; Liechtenstein; Slovenia; Switzerland; International Organizations: International Organization for Migration; UNCTAD; UNIDO; World Health Organization; World Trade Organization	

== Gallery ==
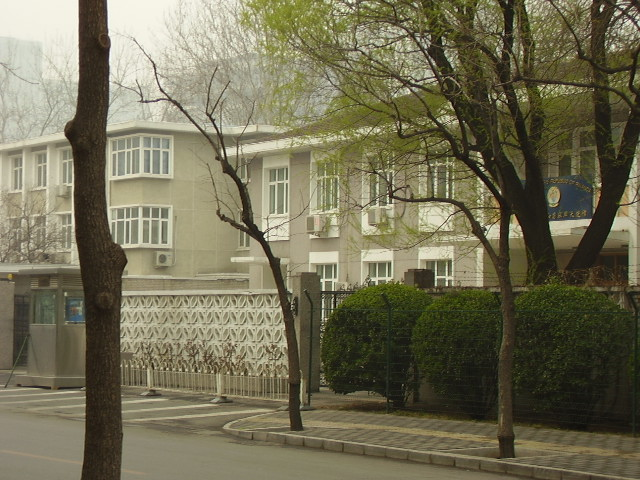
Embassy in Beijing

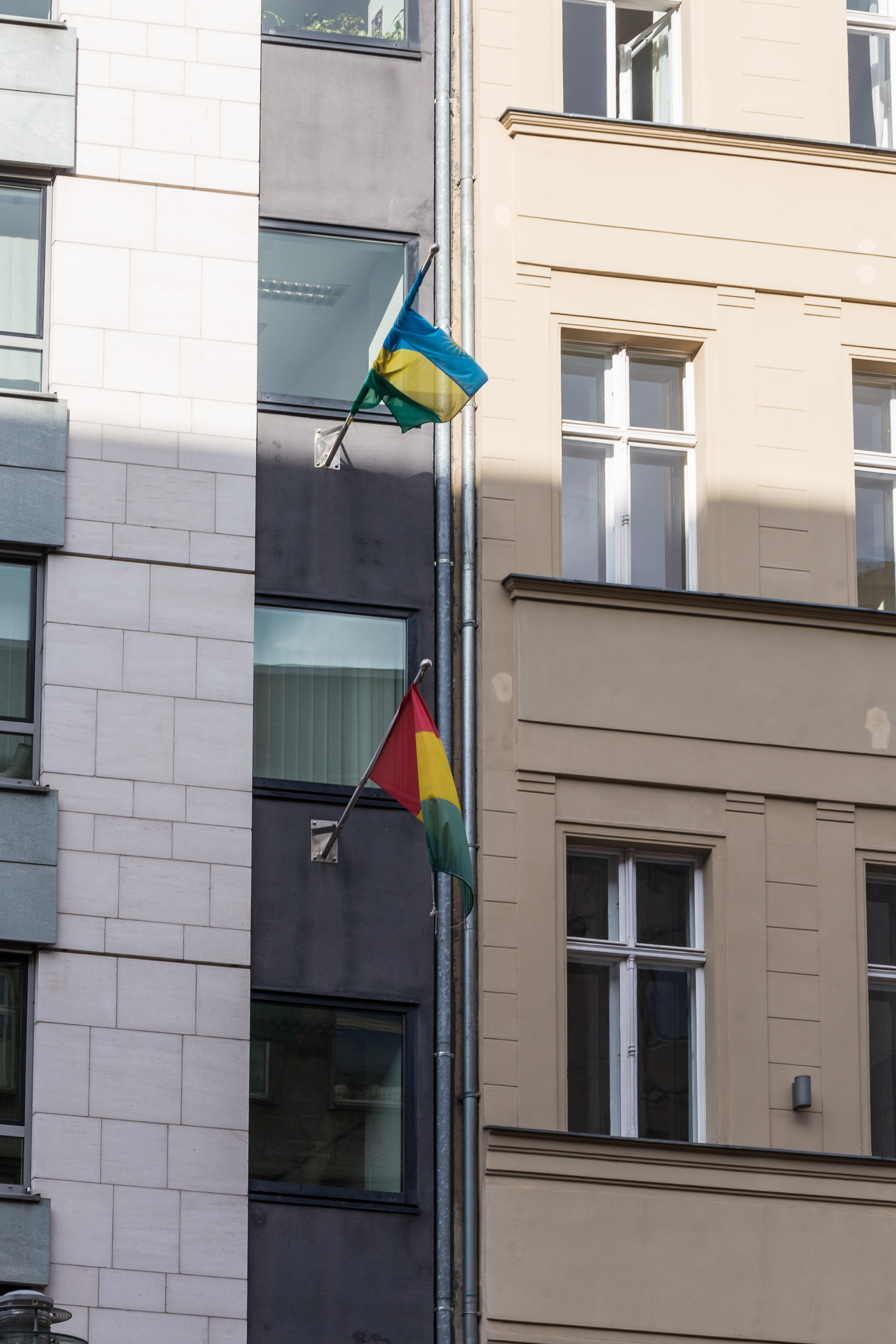
Embassy in Berlin

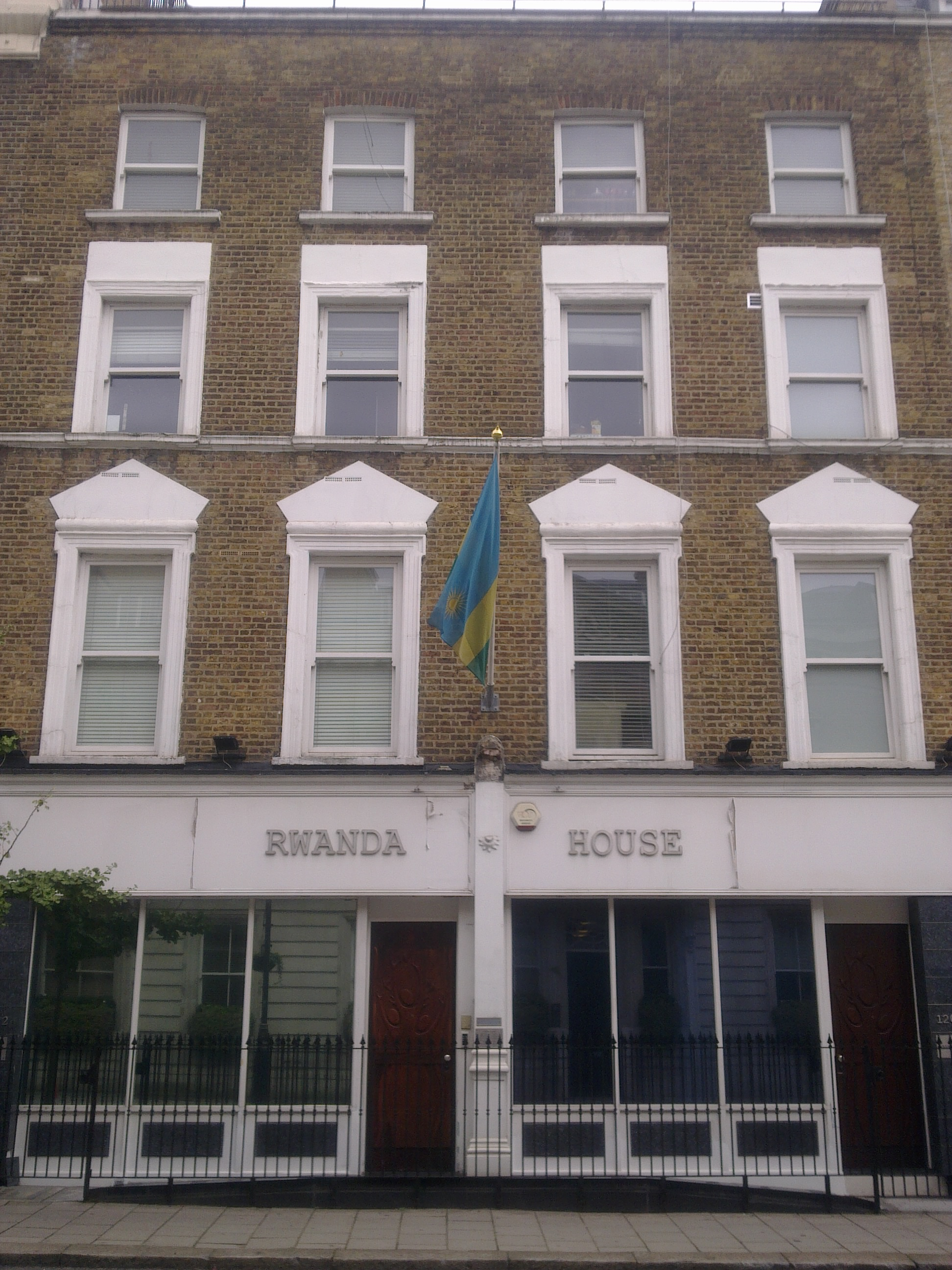
High Commission in London

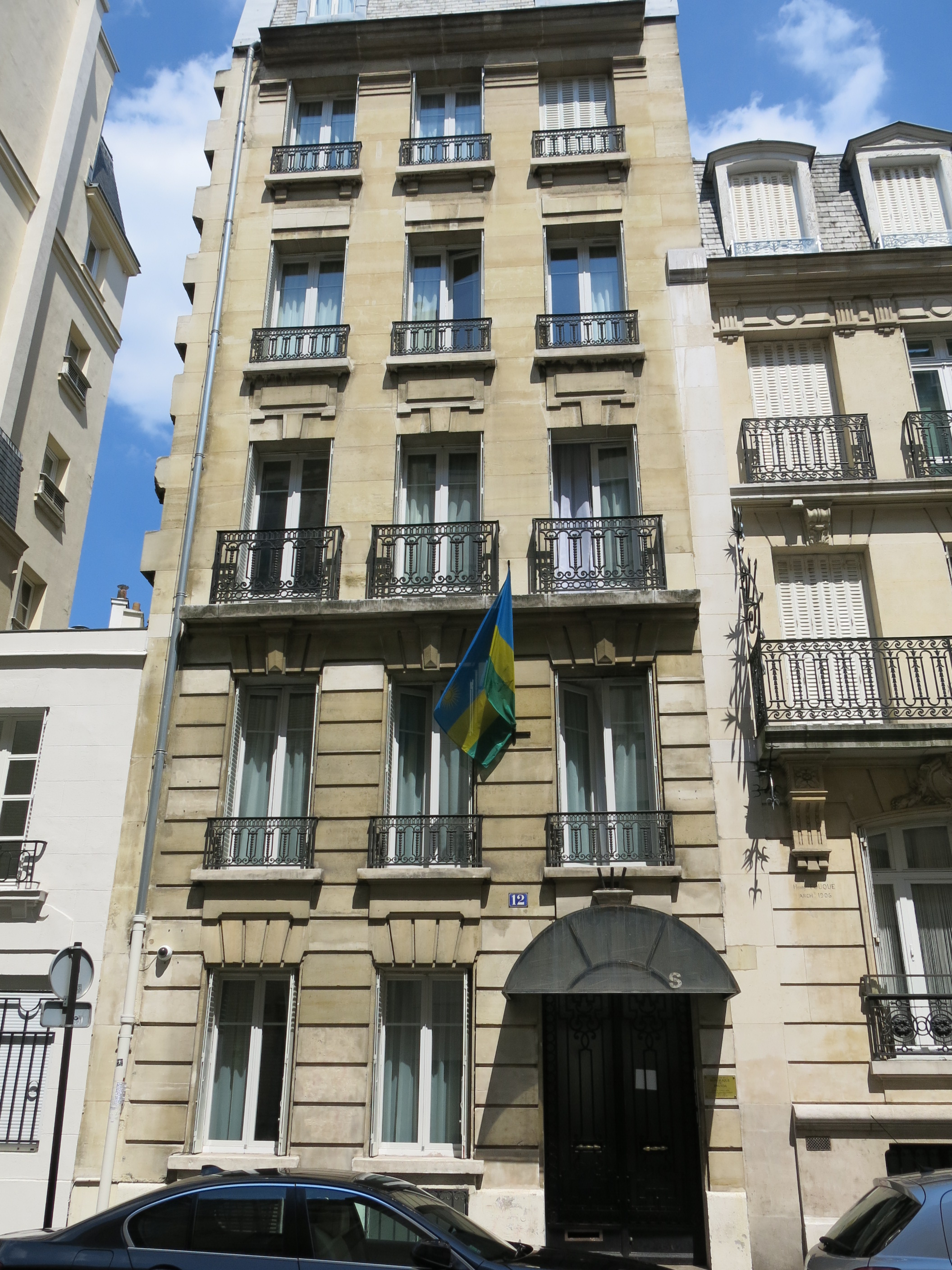
Embassy in Paris

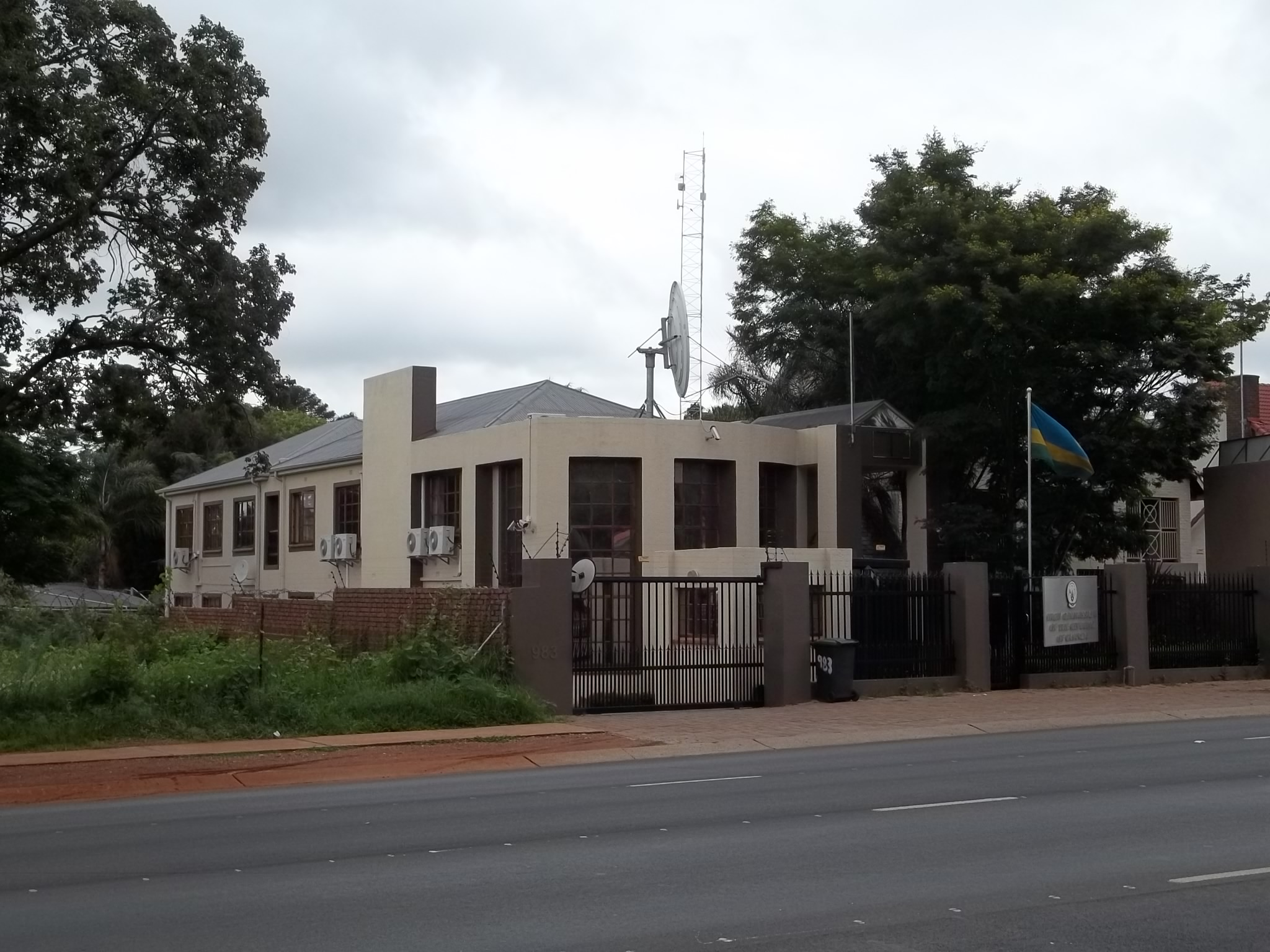
High Commission in Pretoria

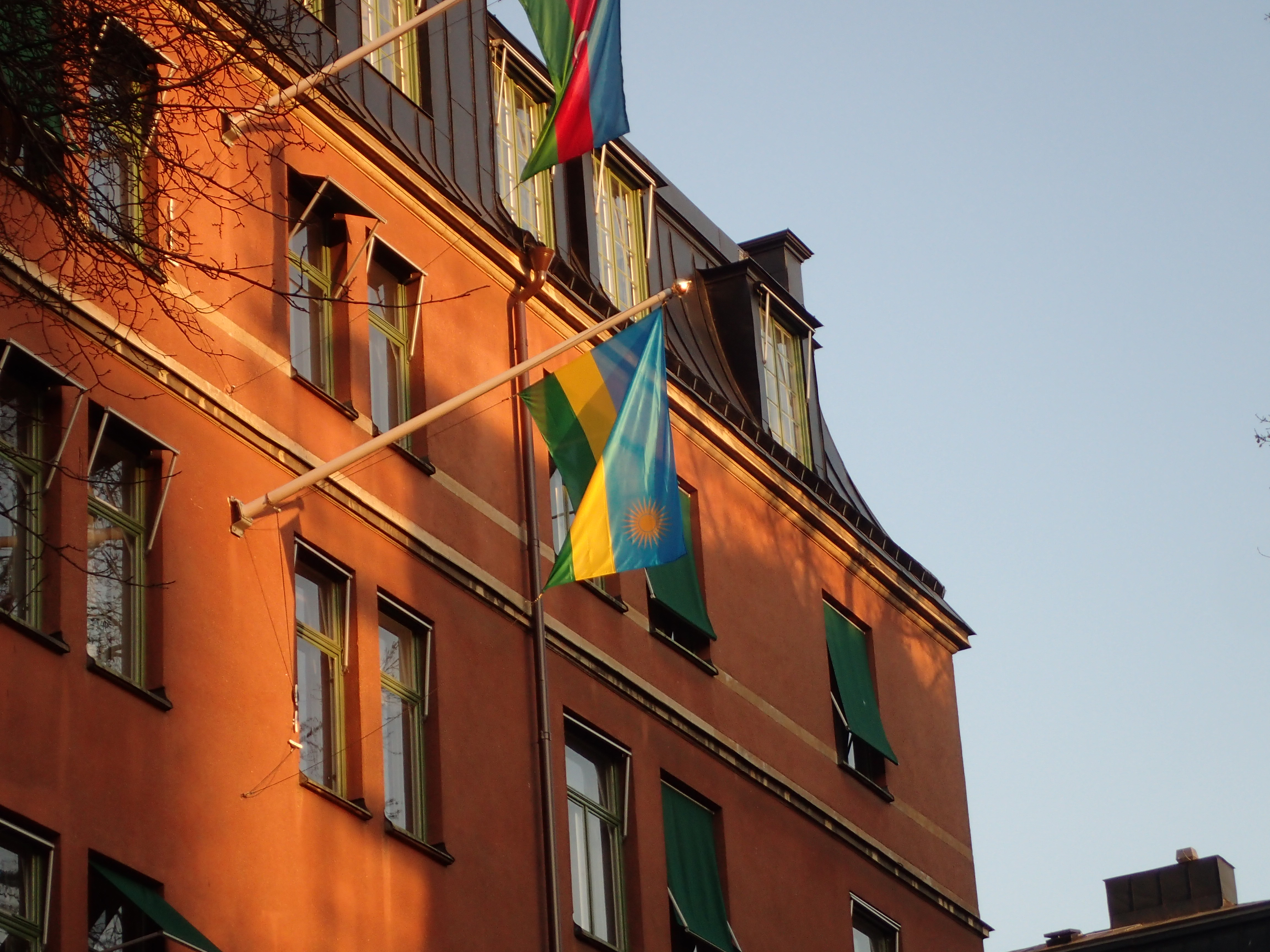
Embassy in Stockholm

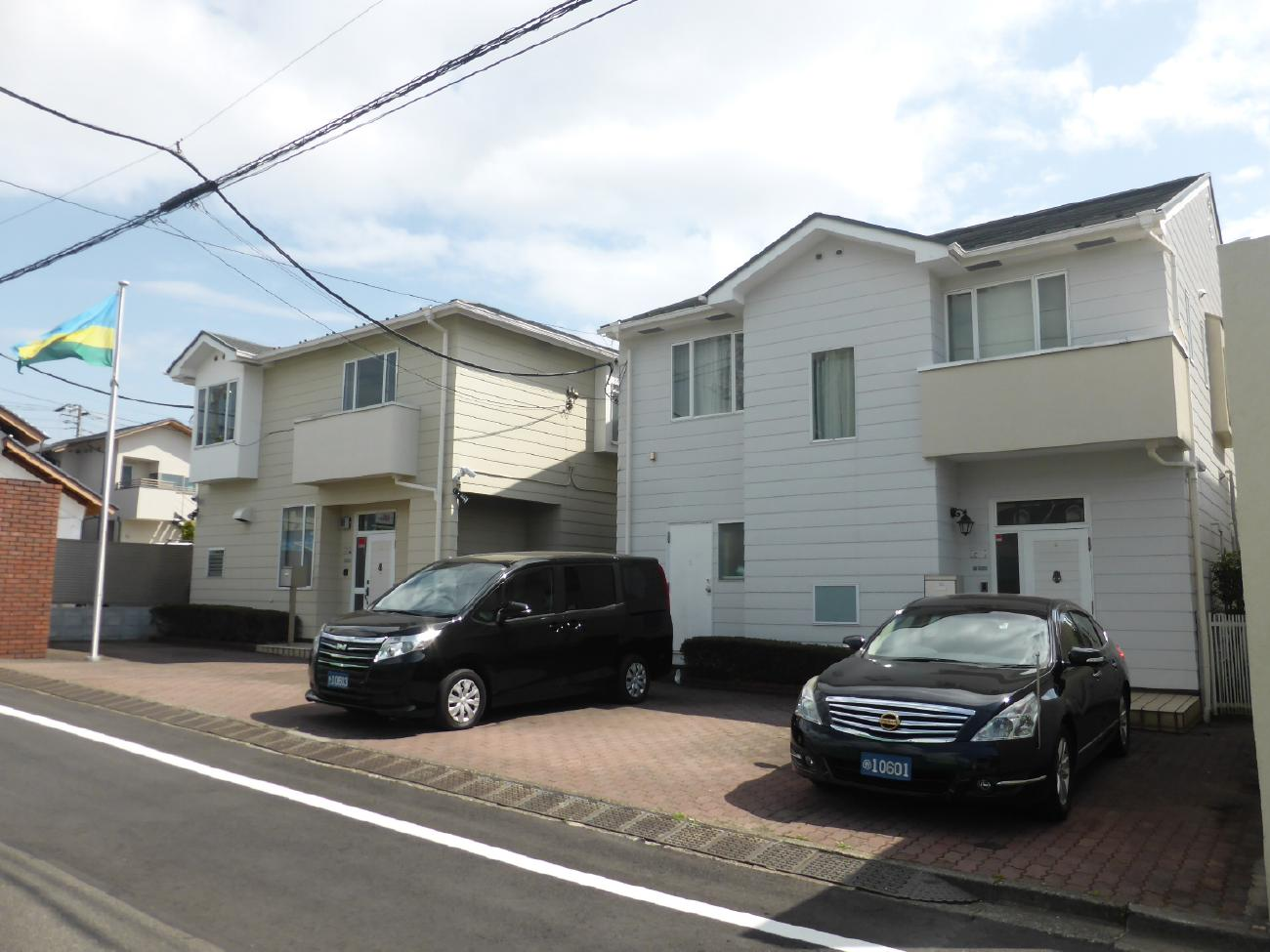
Embassy in Tokyo

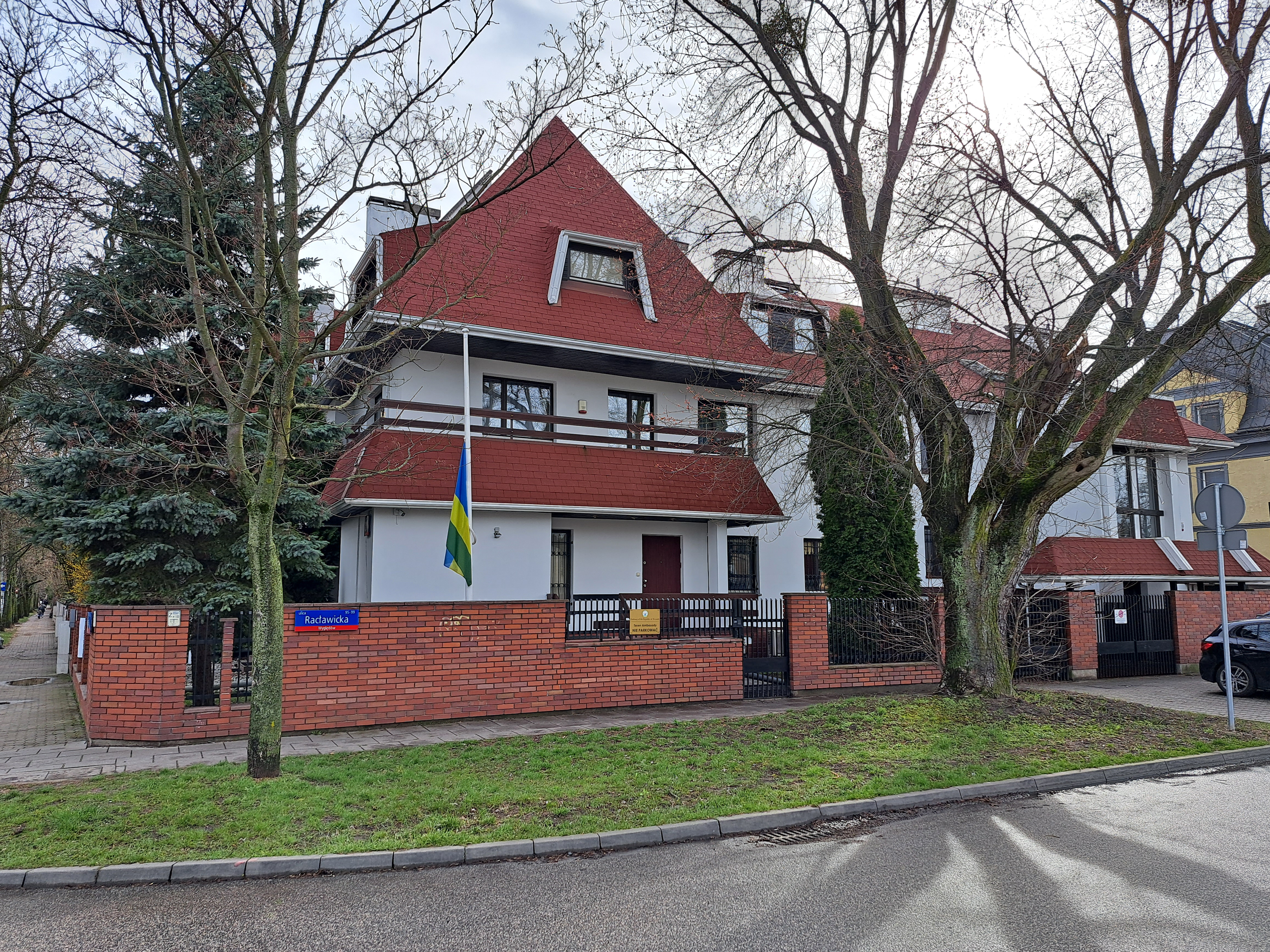
Embassy in Warsaw

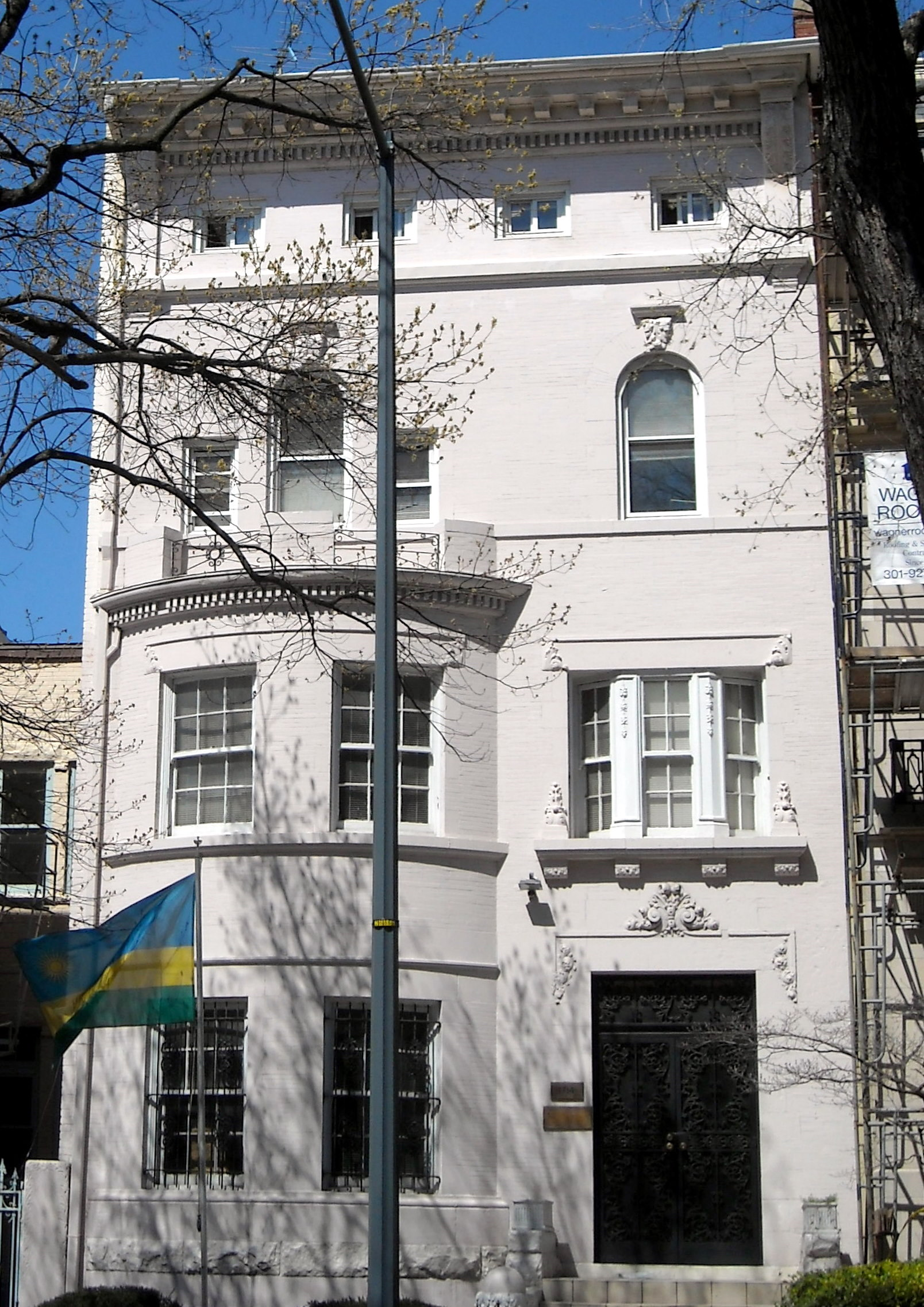
Embassy in Washington, D.C.

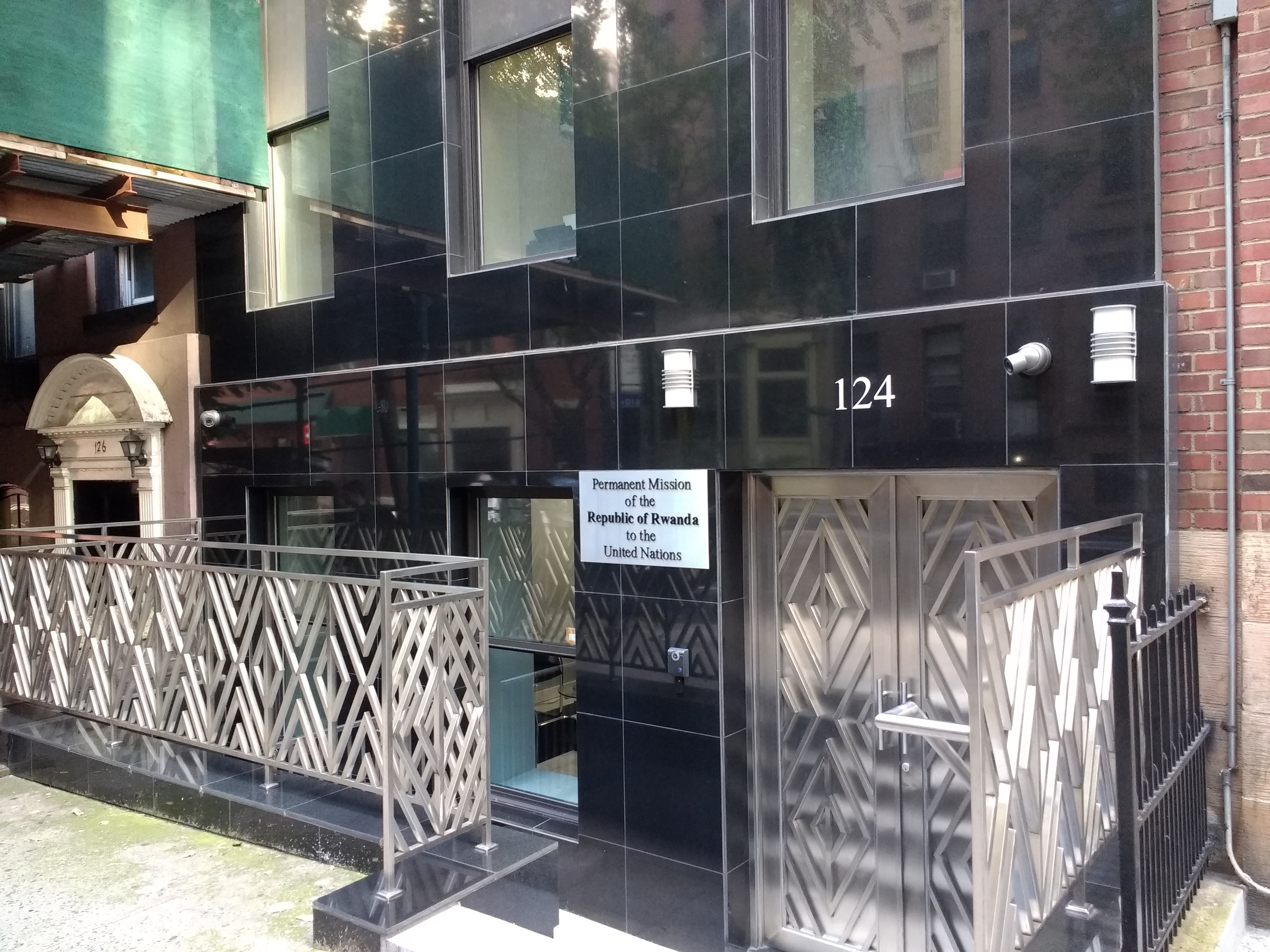
Permanent Mission to the U.N. in New York City

== Missions to open ==
Host country	Host city	Mission	Ref.
Azerbaijan	Baku	Embassy	
Belgium	Brussels	Embassy	
Oman	Muscat	Embassy	

== Closed missions ==
Host country	Host city	Mission	Year closed	Ref.
Belgium	Brussels	Embassy (Note: To be reopened following the restoration of diplomatic relations.)	2025	
Italy	Rome	Embassy (Note: Resident in Paris, France)	Unknown	

== See also ==
- Foreign relations of Rwanda
- List of diplomatic missions in Rwanda
- Visa policy of Rwanda
