= Seymour Place =

Street in Central London

Coordinates: 51.51789°N 0.16242°W

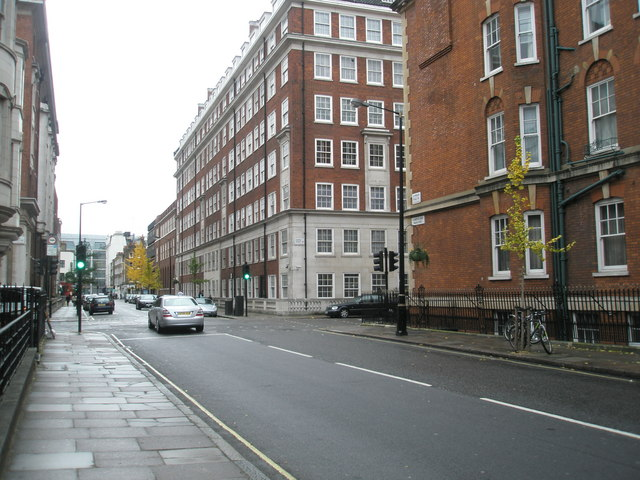
Crossroads with George Street

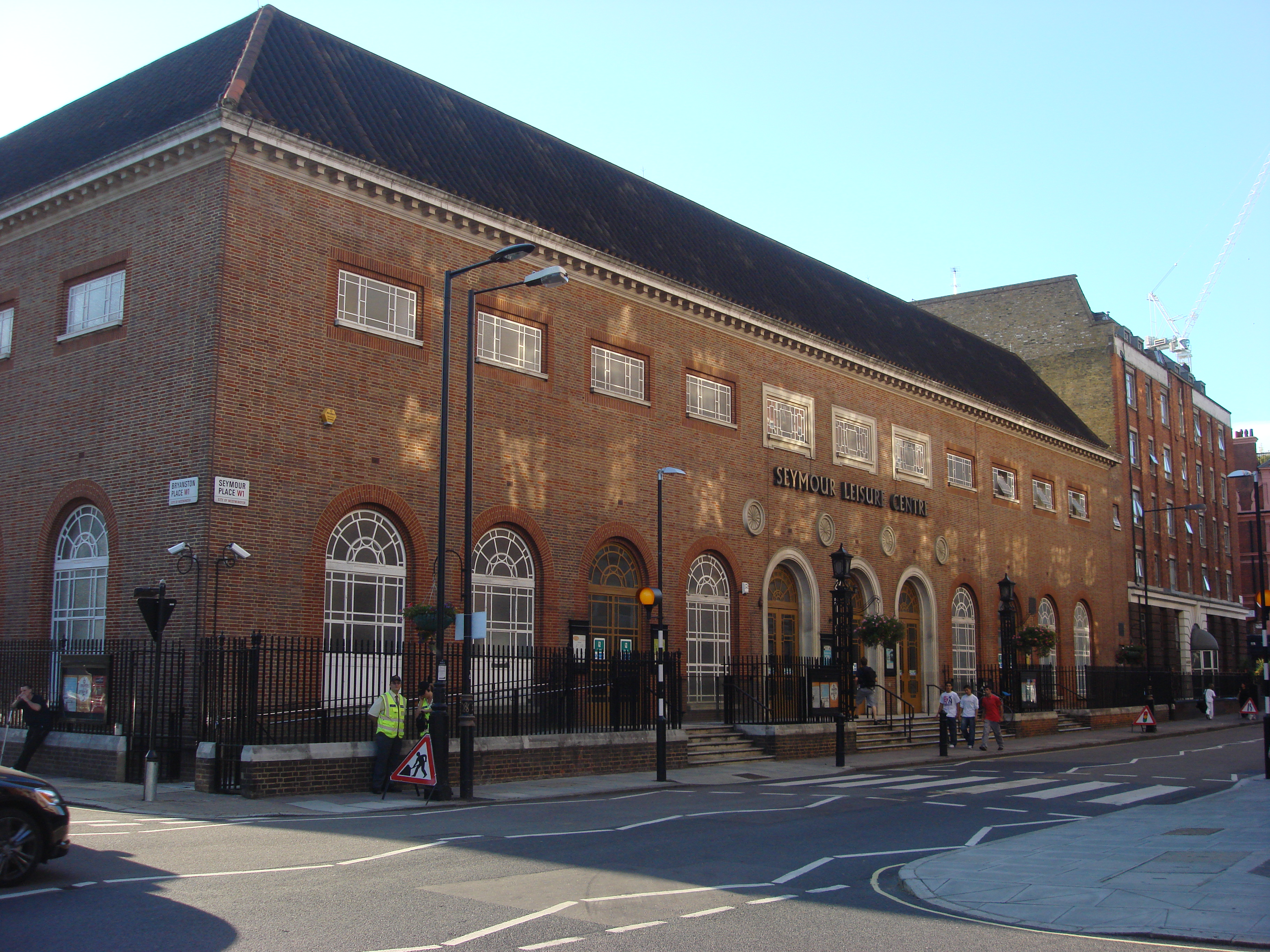
The Seymour Place Baths were opened in 1931.

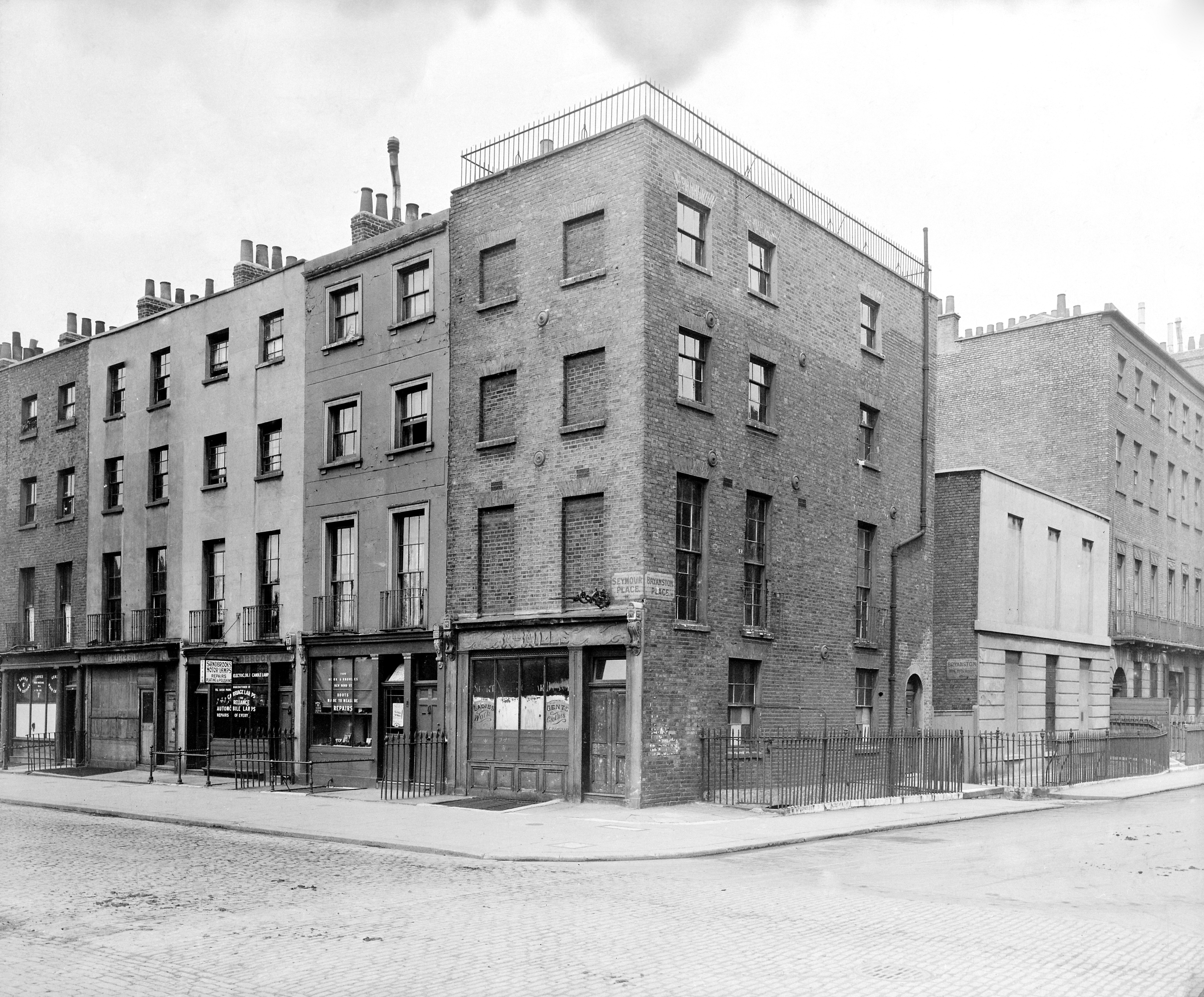
Seymour Place in the Victoria era.

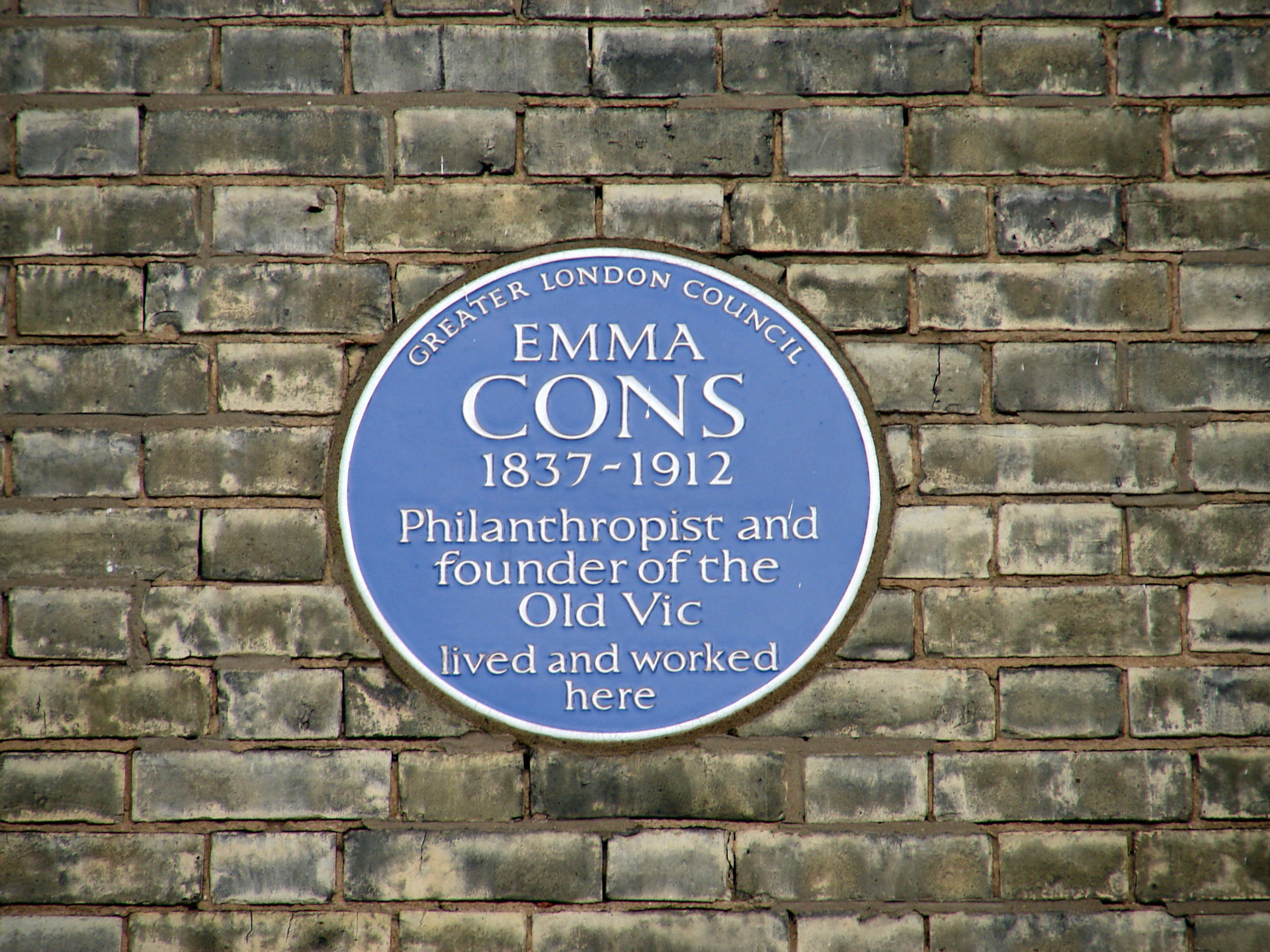
Blue plaque for the Victorian reformer Emma Cons.

Seymour Place is a street in Marylebone in Central London. Located in the City of Westminster, it runs north from Seymour Street until it meets Marylebone Road, where it becomes Lisson Grove. It is crossed by Crawford Street, George Street, and York Street and runs parallel to Gloucester Place, which lies to its east. Its southern end is about 180 metres northwest of Marble Arch and about 40 metres east of Edgware Road.

Seymour Place was created when the former Portman Estate was redeveloped into a largely grid-like residential pattern in the eighteenth century to accommodate the growing population of London. Along with Seymour Street, Seymour Place is named for Anne Seymour, the mother of Henry Portman, who redeveloped the area. From 1849 to 1952, the Gothic St Luke's Church stood the street and the adjoining Nutford Place; the church, which was badly damaged during the Second World War, now houses the Sylvia Young Theatre School. The northern end of the street was formerly named Stingo Lane, after the Yorkshire Stingo public house, until it was demolished and rebuilt in 1872 as an extension of the existing Seymour Place.

In 1866, a pioneering female doctor, Elizabeth Garrett Anderson, opened St Mary's Dispensary in the street. From 1896 to 1961, the Marylebone Police Court was at 163 Seymour Place; this was near the county court on the corner of Seymour Place and Marylebone Road, and in 1961 the police court was closed and moved next door to the County Court.

The house of Emma Cons, a Victorian social reformer, stands in Seymour Street and bears a blue plaque.

The Rwandan High Commission stands in the street.

The Seymour Place swimming baths were designed by Alfred Cross in 1931 for Marylebone Council and today are known as Seymour Leisure Centre or Seymour Hall. The place was refurbished in 2018.

== Bibliography ==
- Cherry, Bridget & Pevsner, Nikolaus. London 3: North West. Yale University Press, 2002.
- Riddaway, Mark & Upsall, Carl. Marylebone Lives: Rogues, romantics and rebels – character studies of locals since the eighteenth century. Spiramus Press Ltd, 2015.
- Thomas, Adrian & Duck, Francis. Edith and Florence Stoney, Sisters in Radiology. Springer, 2019.
- Walford, Edward. Old and new London: a narrative of its history, its people, and its places, Volume 4. Cassell, Petter & Galpin, 1880.
