= Israel–Rwanda relations =

Foreign relations

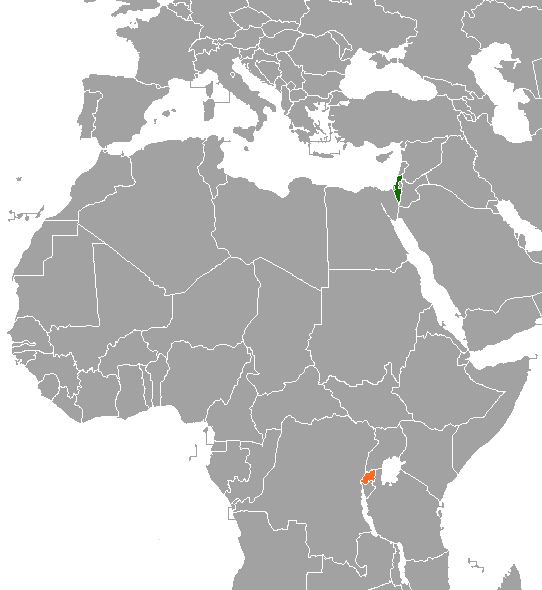
- Israel: Rwanda

Israel–Rwanda relations refer to the bilateral diplomatic, economic, and cultural ties between the State of Israel and the Republic of Rwanda. These relations have seen significant growth and development in recent years, marked by high-level visits, the establishment of embassies, and various bilateral agreements.

== History ==
=== Historical background ===
The relationship between Israel and Rwanda has evolved considerably over the decades:

- In 1962, Israel was one of the first countries to recognize Rwanda's independence.
- During the 1960s and early 1970s, Israel established strong ties with many African nations, including Rwanda, through development aid and technical assistance programs. These programs focused on areas such as agriculture, education, and health care, reflecting Israel's broader strategy to build alliances in Africa.
- Relations were severed in 1973 when Rwanda, along with most African states, broke ties with Israel following the Yom Kippur War. This break was influenced by pressure from Arab states and the broader geopolitical dynamics of the Cold War.
- Diplomatic relations were re-established in October 1994, after the Rwandan genocide. The genocide, which resulted in the mass slaughter of Tutsis by Hutu extremists, led to a significant shift in Rwanda's foreign policy under the leadership of President Paul Kagame. Kagame's government sought to rebuild the nation and establish new international partnerships, including with Israel.
- In the post-genocide era, Rwanda has established a reputation as one of Israel's best friends in Africa. This relationship has been characterized by mutual visits, the signing of bilateral agreements, and cooperation in various sectors.

== Diplomatic relations ==
=== Embassy openings ===
- In 2015, Rwanda opened its embassy in Tel Aviv.
- In April 2019, Israel inaugurated its embassy in Kigali, marking its 11th embassy on the African continent. This move was part of Israel's broader strategy to enhance its diplomatic presence in Africa.

=== High-level visits ===
- In July 2016, Israeli Prime Minister Benjamin Netanyahu visited Rwanda, the first such visit by an Israeli prime minister. During this visit, he laid a wreath at the genocide memorial.
- In March 2017, Rwandan President Paul Kagame became the first African leader to address the American Israel Public Affairs Committee (AIPAC) annual policy conference.
- In July 2017, President Kagame made an official visit to Israel.
- In April 2024, Israeli President Isaac Herzog visited Rwanda to attend a ceremony marking the 30th anniversary of the Rwandan genocide.

== Cooperation ==
Israel and Rwanda cooperate in various fields, including:

- Agriculture: Israel has shared its expertise in agricultural technology with Rwanda, focusing on irrigation, crop management, and sustainable farming practices. This cooperation aims to enhance Rwanda's agricultural productivity and food security.
- Education: Both countries have engaged in educational exchanges and collaborations. Israeli institutions have provided training and scholarships to Rwandan students, particularly in fields such as science, technology, engineering, and mathematics (STEM).
- Technology: Israel, known for its advanced technological sector, has partnered with Rwanda to develop the latter's tech industry. This includes initiatives in innovation, start-up incubation, and digital infrastructure development.
- Cybersecurity: Given the increasing importance of cybersecurity, Israel has extended its expertise to Rwanda to help build robust cyber defense mechanisms. This cooperation includes training, knowledge transfer, and the establishment of cybersecurity frameworks.
- Energy: Israel and Rwanda have collaborated on renewable energy projects, including solar and biogas initiatives. These projects aim to provide sustainable energy solutions and reduce reliance on non-renewable energy sources.

The diplomatic relationship has also been bolstered by initiatives such as the establishment of direct flights between Israel and Rwanda.

== See also ==
- List of ambassadors of Israel to Rwanda

== Sources ==
- Ahren, Raphael (2017-12-21). "South Africa's Ruling Party Resolves to Downgrade Embassy in Israel". Times of Israel.
- Oded, Arye (2013). "Africa in Israeli Foreign Policy—Expectations and Disenchantment: Historical and Diplomatic Aspects". Israel Studies. 18 (3): 190–213. doi:10.2979/israelstudies.18.3.190 (inactive 12 July 2025).
- ISRAEL AMBASSADOR VOWS TO PROMOTE SMART AGRICULTURE IN RWANDA
- The Rwanda-Israel Horticulture Centre of Excellence
- Israel and Rwanda: The Development of a Special Relationship
- Israel and Rwanda’s Emerging Alliance: A Mutual Strategic Choice
- Second Bilateral Policy Dialogue between Rwanda and Israel
- Israeli firm launches business network in Rwanda
- Boosting diplomatic drive to Africa, Israel opens embassy in Rwanda
- Israel inaugurates its new Embassy in Kigali
- Rwandan Perceptions of Jews, Judaism, and Israel
- How Israel helped prop up Rwanda’s Hutu regime before the genocide
- Press Release: An Israeli and Rwandan schools will collaborate on a TiME mutual project
- Rwanda-Israel Horticulture Center of Excellence
- Rwanda and Israel reiterate stronger Cooperation in Agriculture Development
- Israel in talks with Chad and Rwanda to welcome Palestinians from Gaza - report
- RWANDA PARTNERS WITH AN ISRAELI FIRM TO DEVELOP A COMMERCIAL FARMING PROJECT IN EASTERN PROVINCE
- Pondering the Israel-Palestine Conflict in the Context of African Reconciliation
- Eliminating electric shocks and short circuiting
- What happened when Israel sent its refugees to Rwanda
