= France–Rwanda relations =

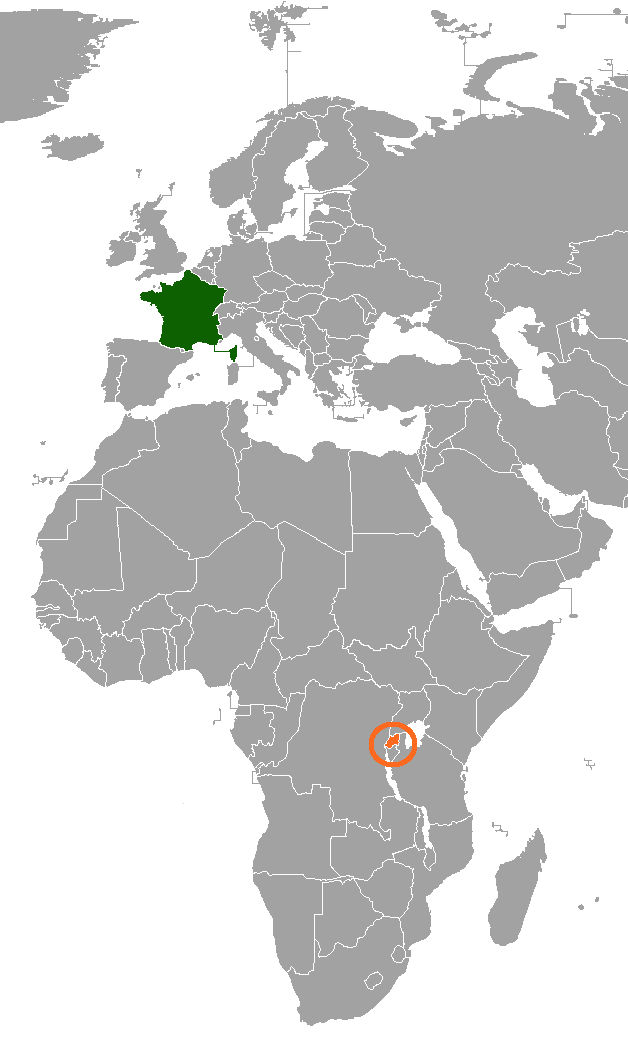
- France: Rwanda

France–Rwanda relations are the international relations between France and Rwanda.

== History ==
=== Early relations ===
France and Rwanda were allies during the reign of Habyarimana.

=== Rwandan genocide ===
France actively supported the Hutu-led government of Juvénal Habyarimana against the Tutsi-dominated Rwandan Patriotic Front. France provided arms and military training to Habyarimana's militias, the Interahamwe and Impuzamugambi, which were among the government's primary means of operationalizing the genocide following the assassination of Juvénal Habyarimana and Cyprien Ntaryamira on April 6, 1994.

Near the end of the 100-day genocide, French troops were deployed to establish the Turquoise Zone, largely preventing further waves of genocide within the purported safe zone. In practice, the zone enabled many genocidal Hutus to safely escape to Zaire in advance of the victorious RPF soldiers. The facts related to the French role in the 1994 Genocide against the Tutsi have formed the focus of ongoing debate, and diplomatic relations between France and Rwanda have frequently been strained since 1994.

=== Post genocide ===
After the genocide, Rwanda sought to distance itself from France, with French institutions being closed, and the language of instruction in schools being switched from French to English. Rwanda also sought to align itself closer to other allies, including the US, the UK, and China, joining the British-led Commonwealth in 2009.

In 2010, during a visit to Rwanda, French President Nicolas Sarkozy acknowledged that France made "mistakes" during the genocide but did not offer an apology. His visit was the first French presidential visit to Rwanda since the genocide.

In May 2021, President of France Emmanuel Macron visited Rwanda, and acknowledged France's role in the genocide. However, like Sarkozy, he did not offer an official apology. Macron also promised 100,000 COVID-19 vaccines to Rwanda.

The military assistance of Rwanda to Mozambique in the 2021 Cabo Delgado offensives may have had the support of France; French company TotalEnergies had significant investments in the affected area. Following the military success of the offensive, France set aside €500m in aid for Rwanda.

In 2025 Rwanda claimed that criticism towards French football club Paris Saint Germain, and their sponsorship with Visit Rwanda, was a danger towards Rwandan peace and stabilization.

== Resident diplomatic missions ==
- France has an embassy in Kigali.
- Rwanda has an embassy in Paris.
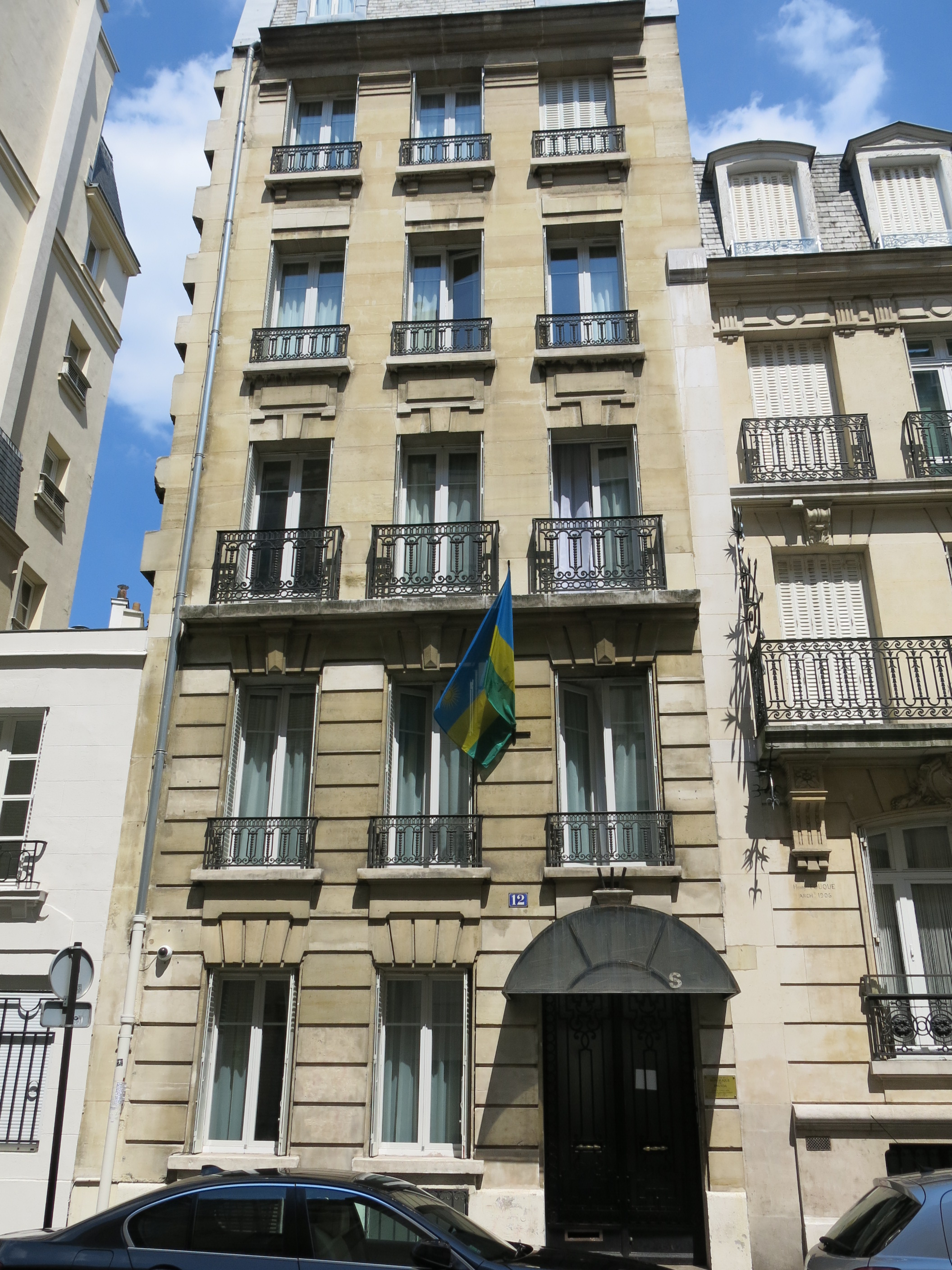
Embassy of Rwanda in Paris
