= École Francophone Antoine de Saint-Exupéry =

School in Kigali, Rwanda

Coordinates: 1.9606°S 30.0695°E

- Kigali; Rwanda

Information
- Established: 1973; 53 years ago
- Age: 3 to 18
- Enrollment: c.200 (2010)
- Capacity: 400
- Language: French
- Affiliation: AEFE

The École Francophone Antoine de Saint-Exupéry (EFASE) or École Antoine de Saint-Exupéry de Kigali, also known as the Kigali French School, is a school in downtown Kigali, Rwanda. The school, with a capacity of 400 students, serves nursery (maternelle) to upper secondary (lycée) levels.

It is recognised by the Agency for French Education Abroad (AEFE). Sections until junior secondary (collège) are directly taught, while senior secondary (lycée) uses a distance education programme from the National Centre for Distance Education (CNED in French).

A 1980 U.S. State Department report stated that the school was "much smaller than the École Belge de Kigali (EBK)."

== History ==
The school was created in 1973. The school was closed from 1994 to 1998 due to deteriorated relations between the governments of France and Rwanda following the 1994 genocide against the Tutsi.

In 2006, after France and Rwanda severed diplomatic relations, the Rwandan authorities forced the school to close. They gave a 72-hour deadline for the school to end operations. The school closed on Monday, 27 November 2006. In 2009 France and Rwanda restored diplomatic relations. In September 2010 the school reopened with 200 students. Jean Nepomuscene Rushayigi, the headmaster, said that at the time 80% of the students were Rwandan nationals.

== Admissions ==
As of 1979 the school gave admission to French national children, and French-language ability was a criterion for placement of children of other foreign nationalities. There were five American students in 1978-1979; their parents were not affiliated with the U.S. Embassy.

== Curriculum ==
The school uses a French curriculum, which is also recognized by the Rwandan government. English classes are a requirement for students, and the school teaches in both languages. The school year begins in September and ends in July. Students travel to Addis Ababa, Ethiopia and Nairobi, Kenya to take A-level examinations.

== Campus ==
The campus includes fifteen classrooms, one cafeteria and dining hall, one laboratory room, one clinic, two libraries, a digital laboratory, two computer labs, and athletic facilities.

== Alumni ==
The Alumni of the school was created in 2020 and aims to support former students and future bachelors in their quest to meet higher professional fulfilment. The Alumni is part of the Union-ALFM, the worldwide network of former students in French schools. The Alumni President is Victor Nkindi.
