= High Commission of Rwanda, London =

High Commission of Rwanda in London
- Location: Marylebone, London
- Address: 120-122 Seymour Place, London, W1H 1NR
- Coordinates: 51°31′12.5″N 0°9′48.4″W
- High Commissioner: His Excellency Mr.Johnston Busingye

The High Commission of Rwanda in London is the diplomatic mission of Rwanda in the United Kingdom and also the home of the Rwanda diplomatic mission to Ireland. The High Commission is located at 120 to 122 Seymour Place, London, near to Marylebone and Baker Street underground stations.

The High Commission provides consular services to Rwandan citizens living in the UK and Ireland including passport applications, marriage registration, emergency travel documents and police clearance certificates. For UK citizens, the High Commission can provide visa services and travel documents, press accreditation and permission to film in the country, along with information on Rwanda and its people.

The High Commissioner-Designate for Rwanda to the UK (and non-resident Ambassador Designate to Ireland) is Johnston Busingye, who was selected to succeed Ambassador Yamina Karitanyi in August 2021.

== Gallery ==
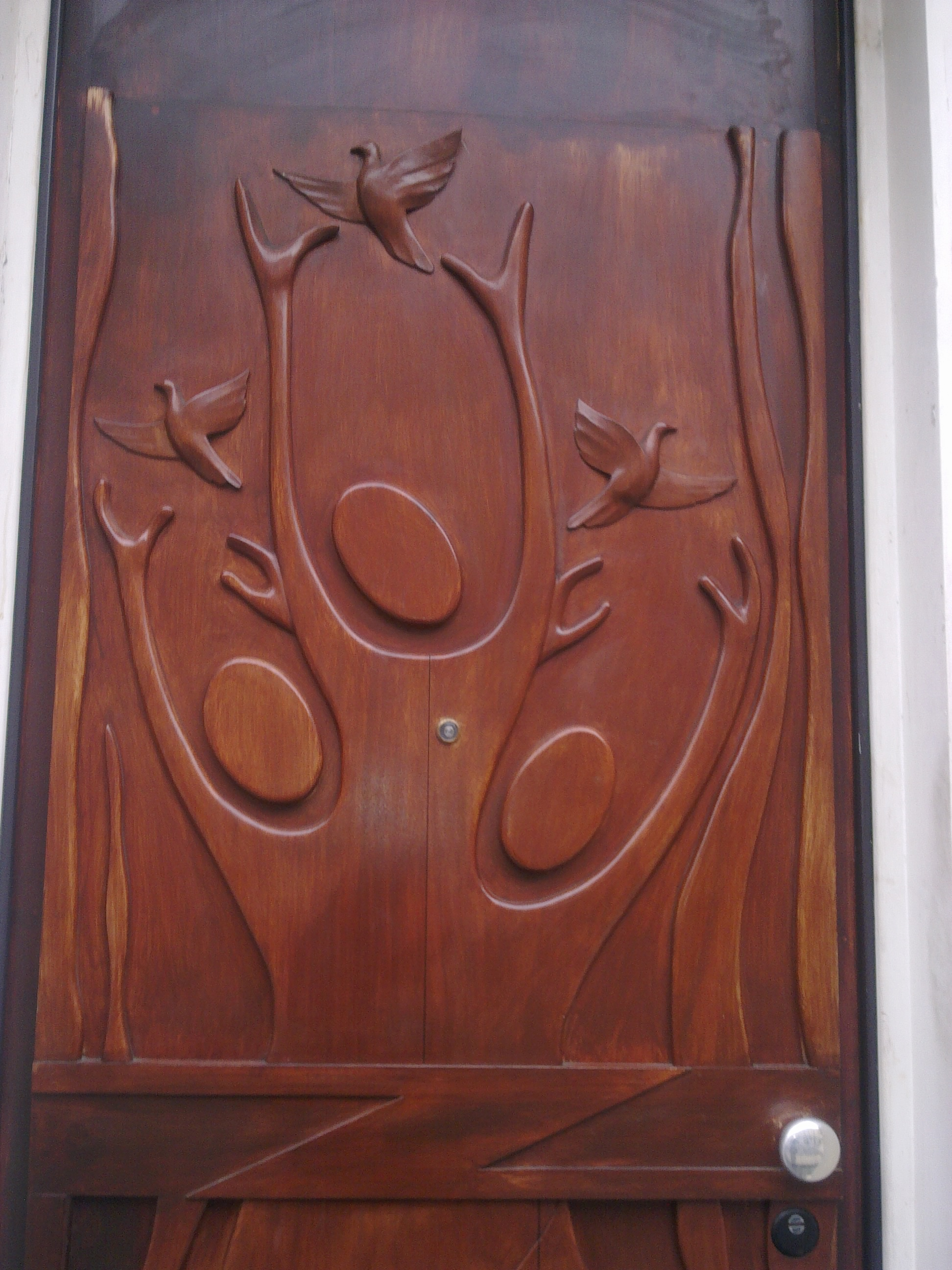
Decorated doors of the High Commission

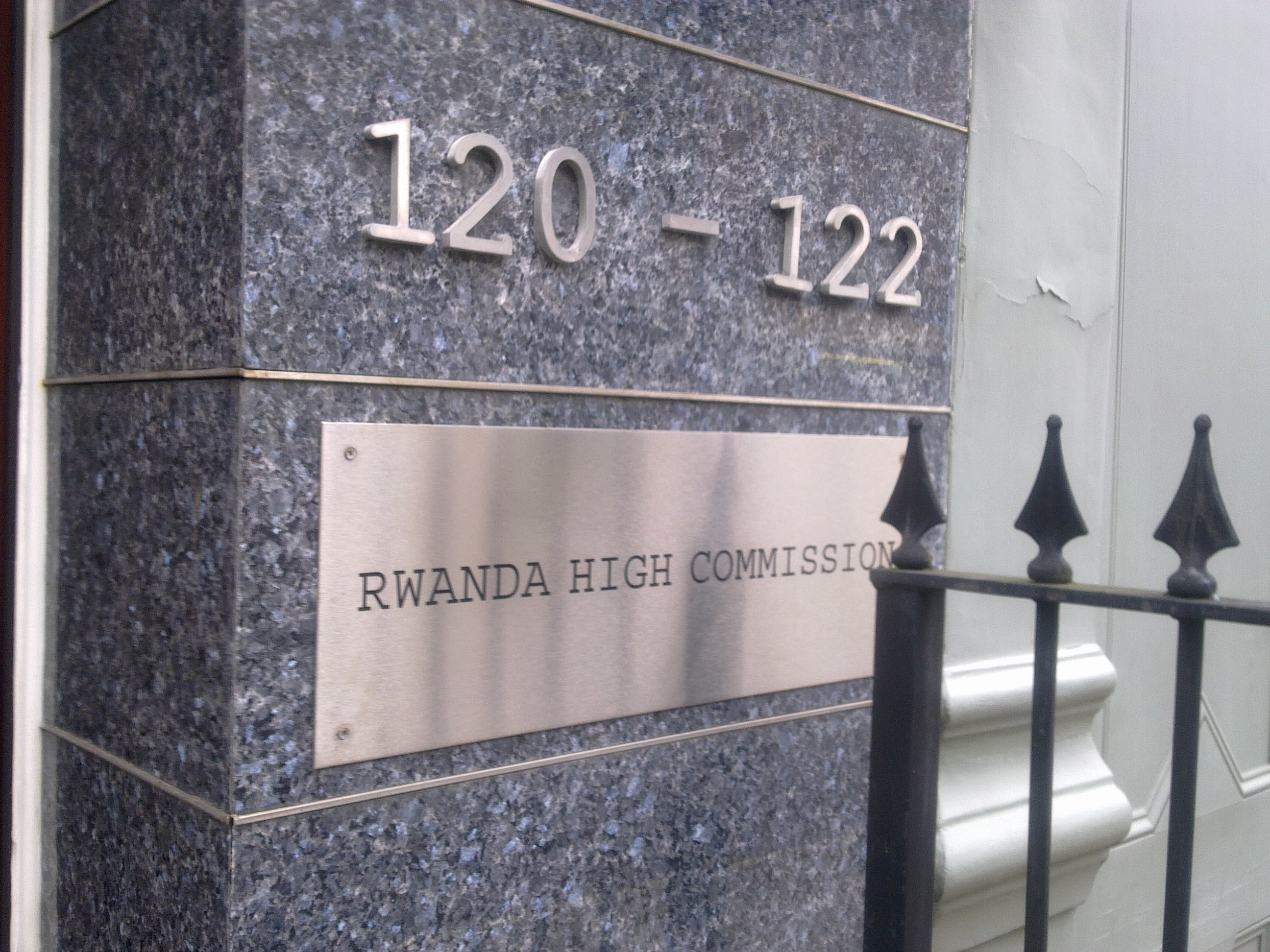
Plaque outside the High Commission

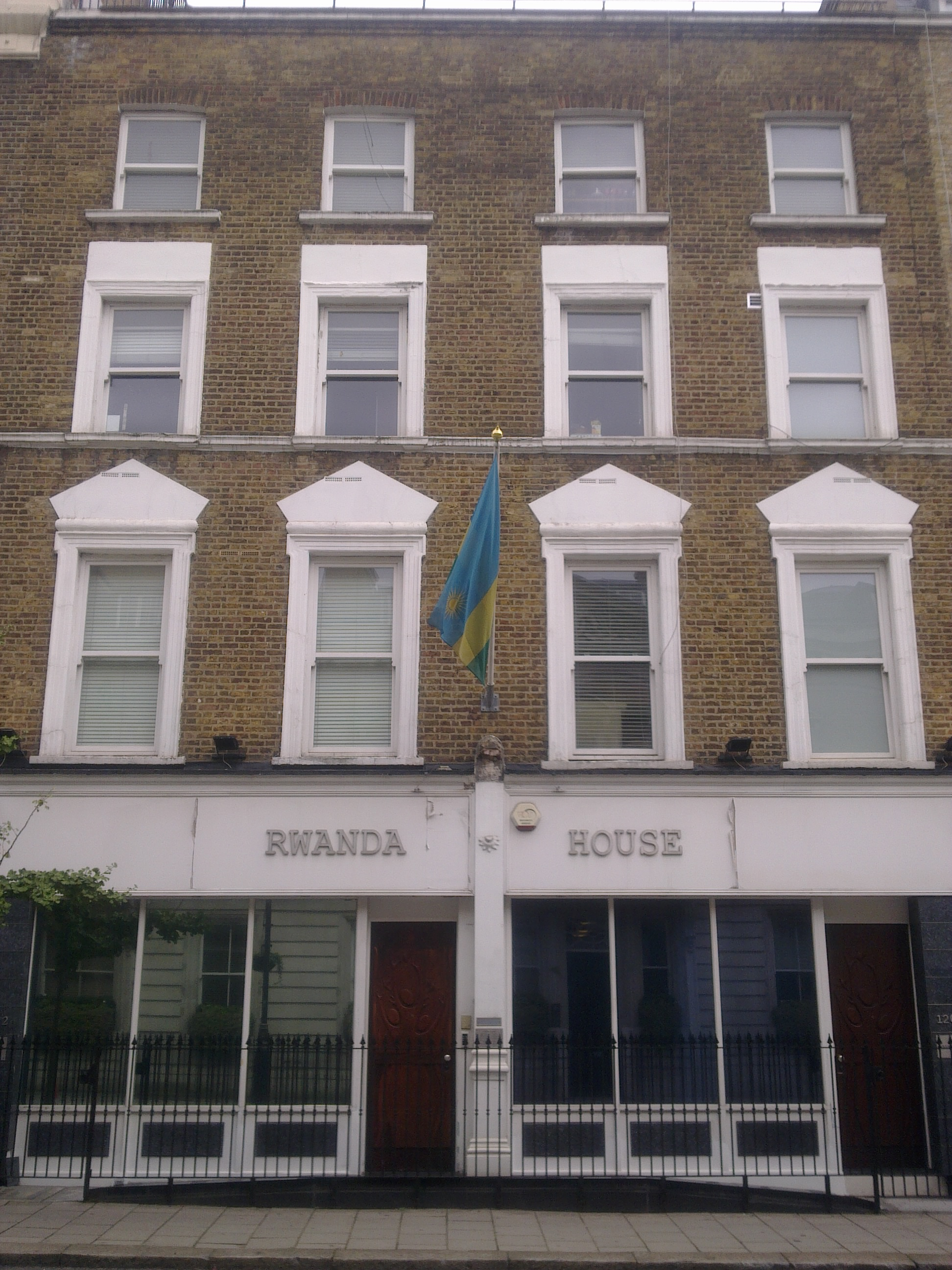
The embassy in 2013
