= List of people indicted in the International Criminal Tribunal for Rwanda =

The list of people indicted in the International Criminal Tribunal for Rwanda includes all individuals who have been indicted on any counts of genocide, crimes against humanity, war crimes, or contempt of the Tribunal by the Prosecutor of the International Criminal Tribunal for Rwanda (ICTR) pursuant to the Statute of the Tribunal. An individual is indicted when a Trial Chamber confirms an indictment submitted to it by the Prosecutor. The Trial Chamber may also "issue such orders and warrants for the arrest, detention, surrender or transfer of persons, and any other orders as may be required for the conduct of the trial."

== Overview ==
The ICTR, which operated between 1994 and 2015, indicted a total of 96 individuals. One individual remains at large as a fugitive and if captured will be tried before the International Residual Mechanism for Criminal Tribunals (the IRMCT). The ICTR (or the IRMCT as its successor) convicted 61 individuals: 24 of whom are currently serving sentences, 22 of whom have completed their sentences, and 15 of whom died while serving their sentences. The Tribunal acquitted 14 individuals and transferred the cases against 10 individuals to national jurisdictions. Proceedings against 10 individuals ended before a final judgment was rendered: two of whom had their charges dismissed by the Tribunal, two of whom had their charges withdrawn by the Prosecutor, and six of whom died.

== List of indictees ==
The list below details the counts against each individual indicted in the Tribunal and his or her current status. The column titled G lists the number of counts (if any) of the crime of genocide with which an individual has been charged. H list the number of counts of crimes against humanity, W the number of counts of war crimes and C the number of counts of contempt of the Tribunal. Note that these are the counts with which an individual was indicted, not convicted.

Name	Indicted	G	H	W	C	Detained	Current status (Note: If not cited, transfer dates and current statuses are taken from the ICTR's "Status of Detainees" list.)	Ind.
Ignace Bagilishema (Note: The conditions imposed on Ignace Bagilishema when he was released on 8 June 2001 were lifted on 3 July 2002 when his acquittal was affirmed.)	28 November 1995	2	3	2	—	20 February 1999	Acquitted on 7 June 2001 (released on 8 June 2001)	
Clément Kayishema	28 November 1995	4	12	8	—	26 May 1996	Died on 29 October 2016 while serving sentence of life imprisonment	
Aloys Ndimbati	28 November 1995	2	3	2	—		Case referred to Rwanda on 25 June 2012	
Charles Ryandikayo	28 November 1995	2	3	2	—		Case referred to Rwanda on 20 June 2012	
Charles Sikubwabo	28 November 1995	3	6	4	—		Case referred to Rwanda on 26 March 2012	
Mikaeli Muhimana	28 November 1995	2	2	—	—	8 November 1999	Died on 26 October 2023 while serving sentence of life imprisonment	
Vincent Rutaganira	28 November 1995	5	12	8	—	4 March 2002	Completed sentence of 6 years' imprisonment on 2 March 2008	
Obed Ruzindana (Note: Obed Ruzindana served 17 years and 165 days of his sentence of 25 years' imprisonment.)	28 November 1995	1	3	2	—	22 September 1996	Completed commuted sentence on 28 February 2014	
Jean-Paul Akayesu	16 February 1996	3	7	5	—	26 May 1996	Serving sentence of life imprisonment in Benin	
Georges Rutaganda	16 February 1996	1	4	3	—	26 May 1996	Died on 11 October 2010 while serving sentence of life imprisonment	
Ladislas Ntaganzwa	19 June 1996	4	4	1	—		Case referred to Rwanda on 8 May 2012	
Elizaphan Ntakirutimana	20 June 1996	3	3	1	—	24 March 2000	Completed sentence of 10 years' imprisonment on 6 December 2006	
Gérard Ntakirutimana (Note: Gérard Ntakirutimana served 17 years and 152 days of his sentence of 25 years' imprisonment.)	20 June 1996	3	3	1	—	30 November 1996	Completed commuted sentence on 26 March 2014	
Élie Ndayambaje	20 June 1996	4	4	1	—	8 November 1996	Serving sentence of 47 years' imprisonment in Senegal	
Ferdinand Nahimana (Note: Ferdinand Nahimana served 20 years and 184 days of his sentence of 30 years' imprisonment.)	12 July 1996	4	3	—	—	23 January 1997	Completed commuted sentence on 22 September 2016	
Anatole Nsengiyumva	12 July 1996	4	5	2	—	23 January 1997	Completed sentence of 15 years imprisonment on 14 December 2011	
Alfred Musema	15 July 1996	3	4	2	—	20 May 1997	Serving sentence of life imprisonment in Benin	
Eliézer Niyitegeka	15 July 1996	4	4	2	—	11 February 1998	Died on 28 March 2018 while serving sentence of life imprisonment	
Joseph Kanyabashi	15 July 1996	4	4	1	—	8 November 1996	Completed sentence of 20 years' imprisonment on 14 December 2015	
Théoneste Bagosora	10 August 1996	3	6	3	—	23 January 1997	Died on 25 September 2021 while serving sentence of 35 years' imprisonment	
André Ntagerura	10 August 1996	4	1	1	—	23 January 1997	Acquitted on 8 February 2006 (released on 25 February 2004)	
Arsène Shalom Ntahobali	29 May 1997	4	5	2	—	18 July 1997	Serving sentence of 47 years' imprisonment in Senegal	
Pauline Nyiramasuhuko	29 May 1997	4	5	2	—	18 July 1997	Serving sentence of 47 years' imprisonment in Senegal	
Hassan Ngeze	3 October 1997	4	3	—	—	18 July 1997	Serving sentence of 35 years' imprisonment in Benin	
Georges Ruggiu (Note: Georges Ruggiu served 11 years and 275 days of his sentence of 12 years' imprisonment. He was released early by Italian authorities in violation of the Tribunal's Statute.)	9 October 1997	3	3	—	—	23 July 1997	Completed commuted sentence on 21 April 2009	
Emmanuel Bagambiki	10 October 1997	3	3	1	—	10 July 1998	Acquitted on 8 February 2006 (released on 25 February 2004)	
Samuel Imanishimwe	10 October 1997	3	4	1	—	11 August 1997	Completed sentence of 12 years' imprisonment on 8 August 2009	
Yussuf Munyakazi (Note: In some Tribunal documents Yussuf Munyakazi's name is spelled "Yusuf".)	10 October 1997	1	1	—	—	7 May 2004	Died on 12 December 2020 while serving sentence of 25 years' imprisonment	
Gratien Kabiligi	15 October 1997	3	5	2	—	18 July 1997	Acquitted on 18 December 2008	
Aloys Ntabakuze	15 October 1997	3	5	2	—	18 July 1997	Serving sentence of 35 years' imprisonment in Benin	
Jean Kambanda	16 October 1997	4	2	—	—	18 July 1997	Serving sentence of life imprisonment in Senegal	
Sylvain Nsabimana	16 October 1997	4	4	1	—	16 July 1997	Completed sentence of 18 years' imprisonment on 14 December 2015	
Alphonse Nteziryayo (Note: Alphonse Nteziryayo served 17 years and 324 days of his sentence of 25 years' imprisonment.)	16 October 1997	4	4	1	—	21 May 1998	Completed commuted sentence on 9 March 2016	
Jean-Bosco Barayagwiza	23 October 1997	4	3	2	—	19 November 1997	Died on 25 April 2010 while serving sentence of 32 years' imprisonment	
Laurent Semanza	23 October 1997	3	8	3	—	19 November 1997	Serving sentence of 34 years and 6 months' imprisonment in Benin	
Augustin Bizimana	29 August 1998	2	6	5	—		Died on 5 August 2000; proceedings terminated on 4 November 2020	
Édouard Karemera	29 August 1998	4	5	1	—	7 October 1998	Died on 31 August 2020 while serving sentence of life imprisonment	
Callixte Nzabonimana	29 August 1998	4	5	2	—	19 February 2008	Serving sentence of life imprisonment in Benin	
Mathieu Ngirumpatse	29 August 1998	4	5	1	—	7 October 1998	Serving sentence of life imprisonment in Senegal	
Félicien Kabuga	29 August 1998	3	3	—	—	26 October 2020	Died on 16 May 2026; proceedings terminated on 20 May 2026	
Juvénal Kajelijeli	29 August 1998	4	5	2	—	10 September 1998	Serving sentence of 45 years' imprisonment in Benin	
André Rwamakuba	29 August 1998	2	2	—	—	23 October 1998	Acquitted on 20 September 2006	
Bernard Ntuyahaga	29 August 1998	—	1	—	—	18 June 1998	Charges withdrawn on 18 March 1999 (released on 18 March 1999)	
Omar Serushago (Note: Omar Serushago served 14 years and 191 days of his sentence of 15 years' imprisonment.)	29 September 1998	1	4	—	—	10 July 1998	Completed commuted sentence on 12 December 2012	
Jérôme Bicamumpaka	12 May 1999	4	3	2	—	31 July 1999	Acquitted on 30 September 2011	
Casimir Bizimungu	12 May 1999	4	3	2	—	23 February 1999	Acquitted on 30 September 2011	
Justin Mugenzi	12 May 1999	4	3	2	—	31 July 1999	Acquitted on 4 February 2013	
Prosper Mugiraneza	12 May 1999	4	3	2	—	31 July 1999	Acquitted on 4 February 2013	
Jean de Dieu Kamuhanda	1 October 1999	3	4	2	—	7 March 2000	Serving sentence of life imprisonment in Senegal	
Augustin Ngirabatware (Note: Augustin Ngirabatware is serving his sentence consecutively with a later sentence of 2 years' imprisonment imposed by the International Residual Mechanism for Criminal Tribunals.)	1 October 1999	4	4	2	—	8 October 2008	Serving sentence of 30 years' imprisonment in Senegal	
Augustin Bizimungu	28 January 2000	3	3	2	—	15 August 2002	Serving sentence of 30 years' imprisonment in Benin	
Augustin Ndindiliyimana	28 January 2000	3	2	1	—	25 April 2000	Acquitted on 11 February 2014 (released on 17 May 2011)	
Protais Mpiranya	28 January 2000	2	5	1	—		Died on 5 October 2006; proceedings terminated on 14 September 2022	
François-Xavier Nzuwonemeye	28 January 2000	1	2	2	—	23 May 2000	Acquitted on 11 February 2014	
Innocent Sagahutu (Note: Innocent Sagahutu served 14 years and 87 days of his sentence of 15 years' imprisonment.)	28 January 2000	1	2	2	—	24 November 2000	Completed commuted sentence on 9 May 2014	
Ildephonse Hategekimana (Note: In some Tribunal documents Ildephonse Hategekimana's name is spelled "Idelphonse".)	2 February 2000	3	2	—	—	19 February 2003	Serving sentence of life imprisonment in Benin	
Tharcisse Muvunyi (Note: Tharcisse Muvunyi served 12 years and 33 days of his sentence of 15 years' imprisonment.)	2 February 2000	3	2	—	—	30 October 2000	Completed commuted sentence on 6 March 2012	
Ildéphonse Nizeyimana (Note: In some Tribunal documents Ildéphonse Nizeyimana's name is spelled "Idelphonse".)	2 February 2000	4	4	2	—	6 October 2009	Serving sentence of 35 years' imprisonment in Benin	
Juvénal Rugambarara (Note: Juvénal Rugambarara served 8 years and 184 days of his sentence of 11 years' imprisonment.)	13 July 2000	—	1	—	—	13 August 2003	Completed commuted sentence on 8 February 2012	
Paul Bisengimana (Note: Paul Bisengimana served 10 years and 10 days of his sentence of 15 years' imprisonment.)	17 July 2000	4	5	3	—	11 March 2002	Completed commuted sentence on 11 December 2012	
Jean-Baptiste Gatete	19 December 2000	3	3	—	—	13 September 2002	Serving sentence of 40 years' imprisonment in Benin	
Samuel Musabyimana	31 March 2001	2	1	—	—	26 April 2001	Died on 24 January 2003; proceedings terminated on 20 February 2003	
Sylvestre Gacumbitsi	20 June 2001	2	3	—	—	1 June 2001	Died on 10 September 2023 while serving sentence of life imprisonment	
Siméon Nchamihigo	23 June 2001	1	3	—	—	25 May 2001	Serving sentence of 35 years' imprisonment in Benin	
Grégoire Ndahimana	3 July 2001	3	1	—	—	21 September 2009	Serving sentence of 25 years' imprisonment in Benin	
Fulgence Kayishema	4 July 2001	3	1	—	—		Case referred to Rwanda on 22 February 2012	
Athanase Seromba	4 July 2001	2	1	—	—	6 February 2002	Serving sentence of life imprisonment in Benin	
Simon Bikindi	5 July 2001	4	2	—	—	27 March 2002	Completed sentence of 15 years' imprisonment on 12 June 2016	
Emmanuel Ndindabahizi	5 July 2001	1	2	—	—	25 September 2001	Died on 5 October 2025 while service sentence of life imprisonment	
Hormisdas Nsengimana	5 July 2001	2	1	—	—	10 April 2002	Acquitted on 17 November 2009	
Emmanuel Rukundo (Note: Emmanuel Rukundo served 15 years and 127 days of his sentence of 23 years' imprisonment.)	5 July 2001	1	2	—	—	20 September 2001	Completed commuted sentence on 15 November 2016	
Protais Zigiranyirazo	20 July 2001	3	2	—	—	3 October 2001	Acquitted on 16 November 2009	
Jean Mpambara	23 July 2001	2	1	—	—	23 June 2001	Acquitted on 12 September 2006	
François Karera	2 August 2001	2	2	—	—	21 October 2001	Died on 9 May 2022 while serving sentence of life imprisonment	
Jean Uwinkindi (Note: In some Tribunal documents Jean Uwinkindi's name is listed as "Jean-Bosco Uwinkindi".)	21 September 2001	1	1	—	—	2 July 2010	Case referred to Rwanda on 28 June 2011 (transferred on 19 April 2012)	
Joseph Nzabirinda	13 December 2001	2	2	—	—	21 March 2002	Completed sentence of 7 years' imprisonment on 19 December 2008	
Joseph Nzirorera	13 December 2001	4	2	1	—	10 July 1998	Died on 1 July 2010; proceedings terminated on 1 July 2010	
Aloys Simba (Note: Aloys Simba served 17 years and 52 days of his sentence in detention.)	8 January 2002	2	2	—	—	11 March 2002	Died on 4 July 2023 while on parole from sentence of 25 years' imprisonment (released on 14 January 2019)	
Gaspard Kanyarukiga	4 March 2002	3	1	—	—	19 July 2004	Serving sentence of 30 years' imprisonment in Benin	
Phénéas Munyarugarama	4 March 2002	3	4	—	—		Case referred to Rwanda on 5 October 2012	
Léonidas Rusatira	12 April 2002	2	2	1	—		Charges withdrawn on 14 August 2002	
Tharcisse Renzaho	15 November 2002	2	2	2	—	30 September 2002	Serving sentence of life imprisonment in Senegal	
Ephrem Setako	22 March 2004	2	2	2	—	17 November 2004	Died on 6 November 2016 while serving sentence of 25 years' imprisonment	
Bernard Munyagishari	9 June 2005	3	2	—	—	14 June 2011	Case referred to Rwanda on 3 May 2013 (transferred on 24 July 2013)	
Dominique Ntawukulilyayo (Note: In some Tribunal documents Dominique Ntawukulilyayo's name is spelled "Ntawukuriryayo".)	13 June 2005	3	—	—	—	5 June 2008	Serving sentence of 20 years' imprisonment in Benin	
Juvénal Uwilingiyimana	13 June 2005	4	1	—	—		Died on 17 December 2005; proceedings terminated	
Laurent Bucyibaruta	17 June 2005	3	3	—	—		Case referred to France on 20 November 2007	
Callixte Kalimanzira	22 July 2005	3	—	—	—	8 November 2005	Died on 1 October 2015 while serving sentence of 25 years' imprisonment	
Joseph Serugendo	22 July 2005	3	2	—	—	23 September 2005	Died on 22 August 2006 while serving sentence of 6 years' imprisonment	
Wenceslas Munyeshyaka	22 July 2005	1	3	—	—		Case referred to France on 20 November 2007	
Michel Bagaragaza (Note: Michel Bagaragaza served 6 years and 139 days of his sentence of 8 years' imprisonment.)	28 July 2005	3	—	1	—	15 August 2005	Completed commuted sentence on 1 December 2011	
GAA (Note: "GAA" is a pseudonym for a protected witness who testified at the trial of Jean de Dieu Kamuhanda.)	11 June 2007	—	—	—	6	1 August 2007	Completed sentence of 9 months' imprisonment on 29 April 2008	
Léonidas Nshogoza	4 January 2007	—	—	—	4	8 February 2008	Completed sentence of 10 months' imprisonment on 2 July 2009	
Aphrodis Bugimgo	12 March 2010	—	—	—	2		Fugitive	
Deogratias Sebureze	21 February 2013	—	—	—	2	Summoned	Charges dismissed on 17 July 2013	
Maximilien Turinabo (Note: Maximilien Turinabo was indicted in another case before the International Residual Mechanism for Criminal Tribunals on 24 August 2018. Following his death on 18 April 2021, the Mechanism terminated the proceedings against him.)	21 February 2013	—	—	—	3	Summoned	Charges dismissed on 17 July 2013	

== See also ==
- List of Axis personnel indicted for war crimes
- List of people indicted in the International Criminal Court
- List of people indicted in the International Criminal Tribunal for the former Yugoslavia
