= Agnès Ntamabyaliro Rutagwera =

Rwandan politician

- Born: 1937 (age 88–89); Kibuye
- Known for: Implicated in the Rwandan genocide
- Political party: Liberal Party

Agnès Ntamabyaliro Rutagwera (born 1937) is a Rwandan politician. Though she was of mixed Tutsi-Hutu descent and children of intermarriage were targets during the genocide, Rutagwera has been sentenced for her involvement in the genocide against Tutsi in Rwanda. Notably, she was accused of arranging the murder of Tutsi politician Jean-Baptiste Habyalimana, who resisted the genocide.

== Life ==
Ntamabyariro was born in 1937 and she had a Tutsi mother and a Hutu father. In 1994 she was the minister of justice in the provisional government that was held responsible for the genocide that took place in Rwanda.

Ntamabyariro is particularly accused of arranging for Jean-Baptiste Habyalimana to be killed. He was a Tutsi prefect who resisted the genocide. She is said to have organised his murder in addition to inciting and planning the genocide. Ntamabyariro was abducted on 27 May 1997 from her home in Mufulira, Zambia, ostensibly by the Zambian immigration service. The Zambian government denied any involvement, however, and Amnesty International raised concerns about her safety. She was later discovered in a prison in Kigali. She would wait a decade before she was put on trial.

She was sentenced in 2009 to life imprisonment by the Rwandan government. Justin Mugenzi and Prosper Mugiraneza were also implicated in Habyalimana's murder but they were acquitted of all charges in February 2013.
