= Casimir Bizimungu =

Rwandan politician

Casimir Bizimungu (born 1951) is a Rwandan politician.

== Biography ==
A former medical doctor, Bizimungu holds a Ph.D. and an M.D. from American universities.

He held several portfolios in the MRND government of Juvénal Habyarimana until July 1994. From 1989 to 1992 he was Minister of Foreign Affairs, and from 9 April to 14 July 1994, during the Rwandan genocide, he was Minister of Health in the interim government.

The International Criminal Tribunal for Rwanda (ICTR) issued an indictment against him and three other ministers, accusing them of conspiracy in genocide, direct and public incitement to genocide, and crimes against humanity.

Bizimungu was arrested on 11 February 1999 at his home in Hurlingham, near Nairobi, Kenya. On 23 February 1999 he was transferred to the custody of the ICTR.

His trial by the ICTR in Arusha, Tanzania began on 6 November 2003. Bizimungu was tried along with several other former government ministers: Jerome Bicamumpaka (foreign minister), Justin Mugenzi (minister of commerce), and Prosper Mugiraneza (minister of civil service).

On 30 September 2011, Casimir Bizimungu was acquitted of all charges at the International Criminal Tribunal for Rwanda and immediately released from custody.
