= Augustin Ndindiliyimana =

- Born: April 15, 1943 (age 83); Nyaruhengeri commune, Butare prefecture, Rwanda
- Military career
- Allegiance: Rwanda
- Branch: Rwandan National Gendarmerie
- Rank: Major-General
- Commands: Chief of the Gendarmerie Nationale

Augustin Ndindiliyimana (born April 15, 1943) is a former Rwandan General and Chief of the Rwandan National Gendarmerie. He was convicted of genocide by the International Criminal Tribunal for Rwanda but he was acquitted by the tribunal upon appeal.

== Background ==
=== Military service ===
Ndindiliyimana was born in Nyaruhengeri commune in Butare prefecture. He joined the military in 1966 and enrolled in the military academy and following his graduation in 1968 he attended the Royal Higher Institute of Defence in Brussels from 1971 and 1974. When Ndindiliyimana returned, he was assigned to work at the basic training centre in Kanombe and while stationed there he helped establish the Para Commando Battalion in 1975 and served as the unit’s director of intelligence and training. In 1977, he was transferred to the Rwandan Superior Military School (École Supérieure Militaire), where he taught courses as well as commanding a group of trainees. Subsequently, in 1979 he was transferred to the Staff Headquarters of the Rwandan Army and became the Chief of Personnel of the General Staff and was responsible for recruiting senior, junior and non-commissioned officers as well as enlisted soldiers until 1982. Ndindiliyimana rose through the ranks of the Rwandan Army first as a Commander, then Lieutenant Colonel and then Colonel.

=== Civilian service ===
Along with his military duties, Ndindiliyimana served in numerous ministerial positions in the Rwandan government beginning in February 1982 when he was appointed as the Minister of Youth and Sports. Following that he was appointed Minister of Transport and Communication in 1990 and Minister in the President’s Office for Defence and Security Issues in 1991 and ended serving as Minister of Defence from December 1991 to April 1992. He was also elected the chairman of the Rwandan Olympic Committee in 1992 and served until March 1994. Along with that role in 1993 he was selected as the secretary of Zone 4 of the International Olympic Committee responsible for the Central and West African zones.

=== Gendarmerie service ===
In June 1992 he was appointed Chief of Staff of the Gendarmerie nationale. Following his appointment he began rebuilding the organisation's command structure, reviewing the Gendarmerie's capacity and in June 1993 he wrote a report on the integration of the RPF into the Gendarmerie. On January 1, 1994, he was promoted to the rank of Major General under the provisions of the Arusha Accords. On April 7, 1994, following the assassination of the Rwandan President, Ndindiliyimana became a member of the Crisis Committee, which was composed of a number of senior leaders of the Rwandan Armed Forces but ended on the 9th of April following the restoration of civilian rule.

=== Post-Gendarmerie ===
During the middle of the genocide on June 5, 1994, Ndindiliyimana was replaced as Chief of Staff of the Gendarmerie and was appointed ambassador to Germany. On June 17, 1994, he departed Rwanda for Zaire en route to Belgium where he would arrive between the 1st and 2 July 1994. Several senior Belgian military officers helped Ndindiliyimana travel and eventually arrive in Belgium and obtain temporary refugee status. In 1996 the Belgian Commission on Refugees denied his official request for asylum due to "serious reasons to think that the subject committed crimes against humanity" but the ruling was overturned two years later by a review panel. Ndindiliyimana lived in Belgium until his indictment and arrest in 2000.

== Role during the genocide ==
Ndindiliyimana was accused and acquitted by the ICTR of conspiring with other high-level FAR officers to plan the logistics of the Rwandan genocide. He was also accused and acquitted of the charge that in early April 1994, he informed interahamwe leaders of a plan by UNAMIR force commander Roméo Dallaire to search for a cache of weapons, a cache which never existed.

Following the death of President Habyarimana, Ndindiliyimana was one of the senior FAR officers to serve on the Crisis Committee, along with Théoneste Bagosora and Tharcisse Renzaho. which committee lasted only two days. The judges of the ICTR found that his role on the Committee was a positive one and that he always tried to achieve a peaceful resolution of the conflict.

Ndindiliyimana is mentioned frequently in Roméo Dallaire's chronicle of his time as UNAMIR force commander. Dallaire writes that he "had always found his [Ndindiliyimana's] loyalties an enigma" and initially assumed he represented a moderate voice in the crisis committee which was correct. Dallaire admitted at the trial that the reason he called Ndindiliyimana an enigma was because he expected Ndindilyimana to mount a coup against the government but the coup never took place as Dallaire had expected. General Dallaire testified on his behalf at his trial and stated that Ndindiliyimana was essentially stripped of his command as of April 7, 1994 and that he worked with Dallaire throughout the war to try to stop killings and to protect civilians.

In his autobiography, Paul Rusesabagina says that Ndindiliyimana was more of a moderate who did not seem to entirely approve of the genocide. He also notes that Ndindiliyimana was responsible for dismantling a potentially disastrous roadblock in front of the Hôtel des Mille Collines. In fact, the evidence in the Military II trial was that Ndindiliyimana's gendarmes initially protected Tutsis at the Hotel Milles Collines assisted later, at Ndindiliyimana's request, by UNAMIR units. Dr. Alison Desforges testified at his trial in November 2006 that Ndindiliyimana was opposed to genocide, and acted to stop killings and was himself threatened because he had Tutsi officers and men in his close protection escort. The transcripts of these testimonies are available from his counsel, Christopher Black of Toronto, Canada and the ICTR.

== Arrest and acquittal ==
On January 28, 2000 the ICTR issued an indictment against Ndindiliyimana along with three other Rwandan military officers, Augustin Bizimungu, François-Xavier Nzuwonemeye, and Innocent Sagahutu, charging Ndindiliyimana with conspiracy to commit genocide, genocide or alternatively complicity in genocide, assassination as a crime against humanity, murder as a crime against humanity, extermination as a crime against humanity, persecution on political, racial or religious grounds as a crime against humanity, "other inhumane acts as a crime against humanity" and various war crimes. In their indictment prosecutors alleged that Ndindiliyimana played a central role in drawing up a blueprint to exterminate the Tutsi population as well as political opponents of the Hutu government along with ordering specific massacres and crimes against humanity upon the Tutsi population. Alongside those allegations, they alleged that Ndindiliyimana was complicit in the assassination of Rwandan Prime Minister Agathe Uwilingiyimana by allegedly having been aware that the Belgian and Ghanaian soldiers protecting her were being beaten and then executed by Rwandan soldiers but to having done nothing to stop it.

Following the indictment he was arrested in Belgium on January 29, 2000 and handed over to the custody of the ICTR in Arusha, Tanzania. He was defended by Canadian lawyer Christopher Black.

On February 11, 2014 he was acquitted of all other charges of committing genocide, crimes against humanity, and war crimes though the judges of the Appeal Chamber later found that it was very doubtful that gendarmes were ever involved at Kansi Parish. The ICTR trial judgment recognised Ndindiliyimana's “consistent support for the Arusha Accords and a peaceful resolution of the conflict between the Rwandan government forces and the Rwandan Patriotic Front (RPF) his opposition to the massacres in Rwanda. and the fact that he had saved the lives of many Tutsis. The Tribunal also held that his arrest and indictment appeared to be politically motivated. He was sentenced to time served since his arrest eleven years prior to the judgment. The ICTR ordered his release but Ndindiliyimana was unable to return to his home in Belgium and was forced to stay in a UN safe house in Arusha, Tanzania. In late September, 2014 the Belgian government permitted his return to Belgium to rejoin his family after almost 15 years in detention in Tanzania.
