= List of foreign ministers in 1994 =

This is a list of foreign ministers in 1994.

== Africa ==
- Algeria - Mohamed Salah Dembri (1993–1996)
- Angola - Venâncio da Silva Moura (1992–1999)
- Benin - Robert Dossou (1993–1995)
- Botswana -
  1. Gaositwe K.T. Chiepe (1985–1994)
  2. Mompati Merafhe (1994–2008)
- Burkina Faso -
  1. Thomas Sanou (1992–1994)
  2. Ablassé Ouedraogo (1994–1999)
- Burundi - Jean-Marie Ngendahayo (1993–1995)
- Cameroon - Ferdinand Oyono (1992–1997)
- Cape Verde - Manuel Casimiro de Jesus Chantre (1993–1995)
- Central African Republic - Simon Bedaya-Ngaro (1993–1996)
- Chad -
  1. Korom Ahmad (1993–1994)
  2. Ahmat Abderahmane Haggar (1994–1996)
- Comoros -
  1. Mouslim Ben Moussa (1993–1994)
  2. Said Mohamed Sagaf (1994–1995)
- Congo - Benjamin Bounkoulou (1992–1995)
- Côte d'Ivoire - Amara Essy (1990–2000)
- Djibouti - Mohamed Bolock Abdou (1993–1995)
- Egypt - Amr Moussa (1991–2001)
- Equatorial Guinea - Miguel Oyono Ndong Mifumu (1993–1999)
- Eritrea -
  1. Mahmoud Ahmed Sherifo (1993–1994)
  2. Petros Solomon (1994–1997)
- Ethiopia - Seyoum Mesfin (1991–2010)
- Gabon -
  1. Pascaline Mferri Bongo (1991–1994)
  2. Jean Ping (1994)
  3. Casimir Oyé-Mba (1994–1999)
- The Gambia -
  1. Omar Sey (1987–1994)
  2. Bolong Sonko (1994–1995)
- Ghana - Obed Asamoah (1981–1997)
- Guinea -
  1. Ibrahima Sylla (1993–1994)
  2. Kozo Zoumanigui (1994–1996)
- Guinea-Bissau - Bernardino Cardoso (1992–1995)
- Kenya - Kalonzo Musyoka (1993–1998)
- Lesotho -
  1. Molapo Qhobela (1993–1994)
  2. Evaristus Sekhonyana (1994)
  3. Molapo Qhobela (1994–1995)
- Liberia -
  1. Momolu Sirleaf (1993–1994)
  2. Dorothy Musuleng-Cooper (1994–1995)
- Libya - Umar Mustafa al-Muntasir (1992–2000)
- Madagascar - Jacques Sylla (1993–1996)
- Malawi -
  1. Hetherwick Ntaba (1993–1994)
  2. Edward Bwanali (1994–1996)
- Mali -
  1. Ibrahim Boubacar Keïta (1993–1994)
  2. Sy Kadiatou Sow (1994)
  3. Dioncounda Traoré (1994–1997)
- Mauritania -
  1. Mohamed Abderahmane Ould Moine (1992–1994)
  2. Mohamed Salem Ould Lekhal (1994–1996)
- Mauritius -
  1. Swalay Kasenally (1993–1994)
  2. Ramduthsing Jaddoo (1994–1995)
- Morocco - Abdellatif Filali (1985–1999)
  - Western Sahara - Mohamed Salem Ould Salek (1988–1995)
- Mozambique -
  1. Pascoal Mocumbi (1987–1994)
  2. Leonardo Simão (1994–2005)
- Namibia - Theo-Ben Gurirab (1990–2002)
- Niger - Abdourahmane Hama (1993–1995)
- Nigeria - Baba Gana Kingibe (1993–1995)
- Rwanda -
  1. Anastase Gasana (1993–1994)
  2. Jérôme Bicamumpaka (1994)
  3. Jean-Marie Ndagijimana (1994)
  4. Anastase Gasana (1994–1999)
- São Tomé and Príncipe -
  1. Albertino Bragança (1993–1994)
  2. Guilherme Posser da Costa (1994–1996)
- Senegal - Moustapha Niasse (1993–1998)
- Seychelles - Danielle de St. Jorre (1989–1997)
- Sierra Leone -
  1. Karefa Kargbo (1993–1994)
  2. Abass Bundu (1994–1995)
- Somalia - no central government
  - Somaliland - ?
- South Africa -
  1. Pik Botha (1977–1994)
  2. Alfred Baphethuxolo Nzo (1994–1999)
- Sudan - Hussein Suleiman Abu Saleh (1993–1995)
- Swaziland - Solomon Dlamini (1993–1995)
- Tanzania - Joseph Rwegasira (1993–1995)
- Togo -
  1. Fambaré Ouattara Natchaba (1992–1994)
  2. Boumbéra Alassounouma (1994–1995)
- Tunisia - Habib Ben Yahia (1991–1997)
- Uganda -
  1. Paul Ssemogerere (1988–1994)
  2. Ruhakana Rugunda (1994–1996)
- Zaire -
  1. Mpinga Kasenda (1993–1994)
  2. Lunda Bululu (1994–1995)
- Zambia -
  1. Vernon Mwaanga (1991–1994)
  2. Remmy Mushota (1994–1995)
- Zimbabwe - Nathan Shamuyarira (1987–1995)

== Asia ==
- Afghanistan -
  1. Hedayat Amin Arsala (1993–1994)
  2. Najibullah Lafraie (1994–1996)
- Armenia - Vahan Papasyan (1993–1996)
- Azerbaijan - Hasan Hasanov (1993–1998)
  - Nagorno-Karabakh - Arkadi Ghukasyan (1993–1997)
- Bahrain - Sheikh Muhammad ibn Mubarak ibn Hamad Al Khalifah (1971–2005)
- Bangladesh - A.S.M. Mostafizur Rahman (1991–1996)
- Bhutan - Dawa Tsering (1972–1998)
- Brunei - Pengiran Muda Mohamed Bolkiah (1984–2015)
- Cambodia -
  1. Prince Norodom Sirivudh (1993–1994)
  2. Ung Huot (1994–1998)
- China - Qian Qichen (1988–1998)
- Georgia - Aleksandre Chikvaidze (1992–1995)
  - Abkhazia - Sokrat Jinjolia (1993–1994)
- India - Dinesh Singh (1993–1995)
- Indonesia - Ali Alatas (1988–1999)
- Iran - Ali Akbar Velayati (1981–1997)
- Iraq - Muhammad Saeed al-Sahhaf (1992–2001)
- Israel - Shimon Peres (1992–1995)
- Japan -
  1. Tsutomu Hata (1993–1994)
  2. Koji Kakizawa (1994)
  3. Yōhei Kōno (1994–1996)
- Jordan -
  1. Kamel Abu Jaber (1991–1994)
  2. Abdelsalam al-Majali (1994–1995)
- Kazakhstan -
  1. Tuleutai Suleimenov (1991–1994)
  2. Kanat Saudabayev (1994)
  3. Kassym-Jomart Tokayev (1994–1999)
- North Korea - Kim Yong-nam (1983–1998)
- South Korea -
  1. Han Seung-ju (1993–1994)
  2. Gong Ro-myeong (1994–1996)
- Kuwait - Sheikh Sabah Al-Ahmad Al-Jaber Al-Sabah (1978–2003)
- Kyrgyzstan -
  1. Myrza Kaparov (1993–1994)
  2. Roza Otunbayeva (1994–1997)
- Laos - Somsavat Lengsavad (1993–2006)
- Lebanon - Farès Boueiz (1992–1998)
- Malaysia - Abdullah Ahmad Badawi (1991–1999)
- Maldives - Fathulla Jameel (1978–2005)
- Mongolia - Tserenpiliyn Gombosüren (1988–1996)
- Myanmar - Ohn Gyaw (1991–1998)
- Nepal -
  1. Girija Prasad Koirala (1991–1994)
  2. Madhav Kumar Nepal (1994–1995)
- Oman - Yusuf bin Alawi bin Abdullah (1982–2020)
- Pakistan - Aseff Ahmad Ali (1993–1996)
- Philippines - Roberto Romulo (1992–1995)
- Qatar - Sheikh Hamad bin Jassim bin Jaber Al Thani (1992–2013)
- Saudi Arabia - Prince Saud bin Faisal bin Abdulaziz Al Saud (1975–2015)
- Singapore -
  1. Wong Kan Seng (1988–1994)
  2. S. Jayakumar (1994–2004)
- Sri Lanka -
  1. Abdul Cader Shahul Hameed (1993–1994)
  2. Lakshman Kadirgamar (1994–2001)
- Syria - Farouk al-Sharaa (1984–2006)
- Taiwan - Fredrick Chien (1990–1996)
- Tajikistan -
  1. Rashid Alimov (1992–1994)
  2. Talbak Nazarov (1994–2006)
- Thailand -
  1. Prasong Soonsiri (1992–1994)
  2. Thaksin Shinawatra (1994–1995)
- Turkey -
  1. Hikmet Çetin (1991–1994)
  2. Mümtaz Soysal (1994)
  3. Murat Karayalçın (1994–1995)
- Turkmenistan - vacant
- United Arab Emirates - Rashid Abdullah Al Nuaimi (1980–2006)
- Uzbekistan -
  1. Saidmukhtar Saidkasimov (1993–1994)
  2. Abdulaziz Komilov (1994–2003)
- Vietnam - Nguyễn Mạnh Cầm (1991–2000)
- Yemen -
  1. Mohammed Basindawa (1993–1994)
  2. Abd al-Karim al-Iryani (1994–1998)

== Australia and Oceania ==
- Australia - Gareth Evans (1988–1996)
- Fiji -
  1. Filipe Bole (1992–1994)
  2. Sitiveni Rabuka (1994)
  3. Filipe Bole (1994–1997)
- Kiribati -
  1. Teatao Teannaki (1991–1994)
  2. Teburoro Tito (1994–2003)
- Marshall Islands -
  1. Tom Kijiner (1988–1994)
  2. Phillip H. Muller (1994–2000)
- Micronesia - Resio S. Moses (1991–1996)
- Nauru - Bernard Dowiyogo (1989–1995)
- New Zealand - Don McKinnon (1990–1999)
  - Cook Islands - Inatio Akaruru (1989–1999)
- Palau - Andres Uherbelau (1994–1996)
- Papua New Guinea -
  1. John Kaputin (1992–1994)
  2. Sir Julius Chan (1994–1996)
- Solomon Islands -
  1. Job Tausinga (1993–1994)
  2. Francis Saemala (1994–1995)
- Tonga - Prince Tupouto'a Tungi (1979–1998)
- Tuvalu - Kamuta Latasi (1993–1996)
- Vanuatu - Maxime Carlot Korman (1993–1995)
- Western Samoa - Tofilau Eti Alesana (1988–1998)

== Europe ==
- Albania - Alfred Serreqi (1992–1996)
- Andorra -
  1. Antoni Armengol (1993–1994)
  2. Marc Vila Amigo (1994)
  3. Manuel Mas Ribó (1994–1997)
- Austria - Alois Mock (1987–1995)
- Belarus -
  1. Petr Krauchenka (1990–1994)
  2. Uladzimir Syanko (1994–1997)
- Belgium -
  1. Willy Claes (1992–1994)
  2. Frank Vandenbroucke (1994–1995)
  - Brussels-Capital Region - Jos Chabert (1989–1999)
  - Flanders - Luc Van den Brande (1992–1999)
  - Wallonia -
    1. Guy Spitaels (1992–1994)
    2. Robert Collignon (1994–1995)
- Bosnia and Herzegovina - Irfan Ljubijankić (1993–1995)
  - Republika Srpska - Aleksa Buha (1992–1998)
- Bulgaria - Stanislav Daskalov (1993–1995)
- Croatia - Mate Granić (1993–2000)
- Cyprus - Alekos Michaelides (1993–1997)
  - Northern Cyprus - Atay Ahmet Raşit (1994–1996)
- Czech Republic - Josef Zieleniec (1992–1997)
- Denmark - Niels Helveg Petersen (1993–2000)
- Estonia -
  1. Trivimi Velliste (1992–1994)
  2. Jüri Luik (1994–1995)
- Finland - Heikki Haavisto (1993–1995)
- France - Alain Juppé (1993–1995)
- Germany - Klaus Kinkel (1992–1998)
- Greece - Karolos Papoulias (1993–1996)
- Hungary -
  1. Géza Jeszenszky (1990–1994)
  2. László Kovács (1994–1998)
- Iceland - Jón Baldvin Hannibalsson (1988–1995)
- Ireland -
  1. Dick Spring (1993–1994)
  2. Albert Reynolds (acting) (1994)
  3. Dick Spring (1994–1997)
- Italy -
  1. Beniamino Andreatta (1993–1994)
  2. Antonio Martino (1994–1995)
- Latvia -
  1. Georgs Andrejevs (1992–1994)
  2. Valdis Birkavs (1994–1999)
- Liechtenstein - Andrea Willi (1993–2001)
- Lithuania - Povilas Gylys (1992–1996)
- Luxembourg - Jacques Poos (1984–1999)
- Republic of Macedonia - Stevo Crvenkovski (1993–1996)
- Malta - Guido de Marco (1989–1996)
- Moldova -
  1. Ion Botnaru (1993–1994)
  2. Mihai Popov (1994–1997)
- Netherlands -
  1. Pieter Kooijmans (1993–1994)
  2. Hans van Mierlo (1994–1998)
- Norway -
  1. Johan Jørgen Holst (1993–1994)
  2. Bjørn Tore Godal (1994–1997)
- Poland - Andrzej Olechowski (1993–1995)
- Portugal - José Manuel Barroso (1992–1995)
- Romania - Teodor Meleşcanu (1992–1996)
- Russia - Andrey Kozyrev (1990–1996)
  - Chechnya - Shamseddin Yusef (1992–1996)
- San Marino - Gabriele Gatti (1986–2002)
- Slovakia -
  1. Jozef Moravčík (1993–1994)
  2. Eduard Kukan (1994)
  3. Juraj Schenk (1994–1996)
- Slovenia - Lojze Peterle (1993–1994)
- Spain - Javier Solana (1992–1995)
- Sweden -
  1. Margaretha af Ugglas (1991–1994)
  2. Lena Hjelm-Wallén (1994–1998)
- Switzerland - Flavio Cotti (1993–1999)
- Ukraine -
  1. Anatoliy Zlenko (1990–1994)
  2. Hennadiy Udovenko (1994–1998)
- United Kingdom - Douglas Hurd (1989–1995)
- Vatican City - Archbishop Jean-Louis Tauran (1990–2003)
- Yugoslavia - Vladislav Jovanović (1993–1995)
  - Montenegro - Miodrag Lekić (1992–1995)

== North America and the Caribbean ==
- Antigua and Barbuda - Lester Bird (1991–2004)
- The Bahamas -
  1. Orville Turnquest (1992–1994)
  2. Janet Bostwick (1994–2002)
- Barbados -
  1. Branford Taitt (1993–1994)
  2. Billie Miller (1994–2008)
- Belize - Dean Barrow (1993–1998)
- Canada - André Ouellet (1993–1996)
  - Quebec -
    1. John Ciaccia (1989–1994)
    2. Bernard Landry (1994–1996)
- Costa Rica -
  1. Bernd H. Niehaus Quesada (1990–1994)
  2. Fernando Naranjo Villalobos (1994–1998)
- Cuba - Roberto Robaina (1993–1999)
- Dominica - Brian George Keith Alleyne (1990–1995)
- Dominican Republic -
  1. Juan Aristides Taveras Guzmán (1991–1994)
  2. Carlos Morales Troncoso (1994–1996)
- El Salvador -
  1. José Manuel Pacas Castro (1989–1994)
  2. Óscar Alfredo Santamaria (1994–1995)
- Grenada - Nicholas Brathwaite (1992–1995)
- Guatemala -
  1. Arturo Fajardo Maldonado (1993–1994)
  2. Gladys Maritza Ruiz de Vielman (1994–1995)
- Haiti - Claudette Werleigh (1993–1995)
- Honduras -
  1. Mario Carías Zapata (1990–1994)
  2. Ernesto Paz Aguilar (1994–1995)
- Jamaica - Paul Robertson (1993–1995)
- Mexico -
  1. Manuel Camacho Solís (1993–1994)
  2. Manuel Tello Macías (1994)
  3. José Ángel Gurría (1994–1998)
- Nicaragua - Ernesto Leal (1992–1997)
- Panama -
  1. José Raúl Mulino (1993–1994)
  2. Gabriel Lewis Galindo (1994–1996)
- Puerto Rico – Baltasar Corrada del Río (1993–1995)
- Saint Kitts and Nevis - Kennedy Simmonds (1983–1995)
- Saint Lucia - George Mallet (1992–1996)
- Saint Vincent and the Grenadines -
  1. Herbert Young (1992–1994)
  2. Alpian Allen (1994–1998)
- Trinidad and Tobago - Ralph Maraj (1991–1995)
- United States - Warren Christopher (1993–1997)

== South America ==
- Argentina - Guido di Tella (1991–1999)
- Bolivia - Antonio Araníbar Quiroga (1993–1997)
- Brazil - Celso Amorim (1993–1995)
- Chile -
  1. Enrique Silva Cimma (1990–1994)
  2. Carlos Figueroa Serrano (1994)
  3. José Miguel Insulza (1994–1999)
- Colombia -
  1. Noemí Sanín (1991–1994)
  2. Rodrigo Pardo García-Peña (1994–1996)
- Ecuador -
  1. Diego Paredes Peña (1992–1994)
  2. Galo Leoro Franco (1994–1997)
- Guyana - Clement Rohee (1992–2001)
- Paraguay - Luis María Ramírez Boettner (1993–1996)
- Peru - Efrain Goldenberg (1993–1995)
- Suriname - Subhas Mungra (1991–1996)
- Uruguay - Sergio Abreu Bonilla (1993–1995)
- Venezuela -
  1. Fernando Ochoa Antich (1992–1994)
  2. Miguel Ángel Burelli Rivas (1994–1999)
