= Ministry of Foreign Affairs and Cooperation (Rwanda) =

Rwandan government ministry responsible for foreign affairs

Ministry of Foreign Affairs and International Cooperation
- Minisiteri y'Ububanyi n'Amahanga n'Ubutwererane; Ministère des Affaires étrangères et de la Coopération internationale
- Emblem of Rwanda

Agency overview
- Formed: 1961
- Jurisdiction: Government of Rwanda
- Headquarters: Kigali
- Minister responsible: Olivier Nduhungirehe, Minister of Foreign Affairs and International Cooperation
- Deputy Minister responsible: Usta Kaitesi, Minister of State for Foreign Affairs
- Agency executive: Fidelis Mironko, Permanent Secretary
- Website: www.minaffet.gov.rw

The Ministry of Foreign Affairs and International Cooperation (MINAFFET) is the foreign ministry of Rwanda. It was formerly called the Ministry of Foreign Affairs and Cooperation. The ministry coordinates the country's foreign policy and defends the interests of Rwanda and its citizens abroad.

The ministry is based in Kigali. Since June 2024, the minister has been Olivier Nduhungirehe.

== Role ==
Meeting at the ministry, January 2014

The ministry develops strategies and programmes to implement, monitor and evaluate Rwanda's foreign policy. It also explains this policy in Rwanda and abroad. Its vision is "a peaceful, prosperous and sovereign Rwanda" that plays a leading role in regional, continental and international cooperation.

The minister is assisted by a Minister of State for Foreign Affairs. Since December 2025, this post has been held by Usta Kaitesi. The Permanent Secretary, Fidelis Mironko, was appointed in November 2025.

== Ministers ==
The following people have served as Minister of Foreign Affairs.

- Otto Rusingizandekwe (1961–1962)
- Callixte Habamenshi (1962–1963)
- Lazare Mpakaniye (1963–1965)
- Thaddée Bagaragaza (1965–1969)
- Sylvestre Nsanzimana (1969–1971)
- Deogratias Gashonga (1971–1972, acting)
- Augustin Munyaneza (1972–1973)
- Aloys Nsekalije (1973–1979)
- François Ngarukiyintwali (1979–1989)
- Casimir Bizimungu (1989–1992)
- Boniface Ngulinzira (1992–1993)
- Anastase Gasana (1993–1994)
- Jérôme Bicamumpaka (1994)
- Jean-Marie Ndagijimana (1994)
- Anastase Gasana (1994–1999)
- Amri Sued Ismail (1999)
- Augustin Iyamuremye (1999–2000)
- André Bumaya (2000–2002)
- Charles Murigande (2002–2008)
- Rosemary Museminali (2008–2009)
- Louise Mushikiwabo (2009–2018)
- Richard Sezibera (2018 – November 2019)
- Vincent Biruta (November 2019 – June 2024)
- Olivier Nduhungirehe (since June 2024)

=== Ministers of State ===
- James Kabarebe (until December 2025)
- Usta Kaitesi (since December 2025)

== See also ==
- Foreign relations of Rwanda
- Cabinet of Rwanda
