= André Kameya =

Rwandan journalist and politician

- Born: May 15, 1946; Southern Province, Rwanda
- Died: June 1994
- Occupations: Journalist and politician
- Known for: Founded the Rwanda Rushya

André Kameya (1946–1994) was a Rwandan journalist and politician. After a period in government service he founded the Rwanda Rushya ("New Rwanda") newspaper, which was critical of the Habyarimana government. He campaigned for democracy and was a prominent member of the Parti Liberal. He was killed in June 1994.

== Biography ==
André Kameya was born on 15 May 1946 in Southern Province, Rwanda, (Note: Then Prefecture Butare, Commune Kibayi) the child of Augustin Rubwiriza and Nyirabahakwa Pascasie. Upon finishing primary education at Mugombwa Primary School, he attended the Karubanda Catholic seminary and then continued to Nyakibanda Major Seminary for priesthood training. While in his last year, working in Kabgayi in 1971–72, he was subjected to discrimination that awoke his sense of justice. He started to write articles for the Catholic newspaper Kinyamateka. Discrimination against Tutsi was not uncommon. This brought him to the attention of the internal security services and he was ejected from the seminary under the orders of Kayibanda. This purge instituted by the government saw many Tutsi students ejected from many Catholic seminaries and some killed.

Like many Tutsis, he took the road to exile in 1972 and returned to Rwanda in 1974. He subsequently worked for Kinyamateka, the newspaper published by the Catholic Church. in 1981, he moved to Rwandan Office of Information (ORINFOR), working on La Releve, the government's French language newspaper. Following training in law in 1984 he moved to the ministry of justice (MINIJUST), where he was the editor of the ministry journal.

After a few years in the ministry of justice, he moved to the ministry of scientific research and culture (MINESUPRES) until his resignation from public service in 1991 to start his own weekly newspaper, Rwanda Rushya ("New Rwanda"), which was critical of the government of Juvénal Habyarimana. He was among the 33 intellectuals who signed a petition to the then president Juvenal Habyarimana for the introduction of democracy and a multiparty system.

At the time when the government was fighting the Rwandan Patriotic Front (RPF), he is credited to have traveled to Byumba in the RPF zone via Kampala and met the RPF leaders Alexis Kanyarengwe and Paul Kagame for interviews. Upon his return he published the first ever article inside Rwanda - called "U Rwanda mu Rundi" (Rwanda inside Rwanda) - to comment on the objectives of the RPF and the legitimacy of their war. He was subsequently jailed for this.

The government was then depicting RPF as a bunch of Ugandan foreigners who were mounting a campaign of aggression towards Rwanda. Rwanda Rushya at times was published bi-monthly and managed to reach 3000 copies per month. Kameya was also a founding member and Secretary-General of the Parti Liberal and was in charge of the Information Commission and editor of the party's journal that came out a few times.

Kameya was killed in June 1994. His wife, Suzanne Nyiramuruta, was also killed along with their daughter in April 1994. Among many controversies surrounding his death, Olivier, Kameya's eldest son, has consistently accused the then Parish Father Wenceslas Munyeshyaka of responsibility for delivering him to the killers under the orders of Tharcisse Renzaho which were carried out by Odette Nyirabagenzi. He is buried together with other assassinated politicians at Rebero, Kicukiro District.
