= Bizimungu =

Bizimungu is a surname. Notable people with the surname include:

- Augustin Bizimungu (b. 1952), convicted war criminal and former general of the Rwandan Armed Forces, currently serving 30 years in prison for genocide and crimes against humanity
- Pasteur Bizimungu (b. 1950), president of Rwanda from 1994 to 2000
