= Mugiraneza =

Mugiraneza is a surname. Notable people with the surname include:

- Jean-Baptiste Mugiraneza (born 1991), Rwandan football coach
- Prosper Mugiraneza, Rwandan government minister
