= List of ambassadors of Rwanda to Belgium =

Coordinates: 50.833013°N 4.404503°E

Ambassador of Rwanda to Belgium
- Incumbent; Robert Masozera Mutanguha since January 19, 2012
- Inaugural holder: Augustin Munyaneza
- Formation: March 18, 1963
- Abolished: March 17, 2025

The Rwandan Ambassador to Belgium is the official representative of the Government of Rwanda to the Government of Belgium he is concurrently accredited to the European Commission, the government in The Hague and the Holy See.

== List of representatives ==
Diplomatic accreditation	Ambassador	Observations	List of presidents of Rwanda	Prime Minister of Belgium	Term end
March 18, 1963	Augustin Munyaneza	(*September 28, 1939 en Musambira (Gitarama)). From February 21, 1972 to 1973 he was Minister of Foreign Affairs (Rwanda) After high school, become officials of the former administration of Ruanda-Urundi, Deputy Prefect of Cyangugu in 1960 and Prefect in 1961.	Grégoire Kayibanda	Théo Lefèvre	
July 17, 1967	Thaddée Maliro	Chargé d'affaires	Grégoire Kayibanda	Gaston Eyskens	
December 2, 1971	Léonidas Munyanshongore	On November 23, 1965 he was first secretary in Paris and became Permanent Representative to the UNESCO.	Grégoire Kayibanda	Gaston Eyskens	
January 15, 1974	Ignace Karuhije	(* June 10, 1934 in Janja, Ruhengeri Prefecture) married, four children. ed. Catholic Univ. of Louvain, Belgium 1966-1968 he was Official in Ministry of Education. From 1968 to 1972 he was Prefect of Ruhengeria Prefecture. From 1972 to 1973 he was Ambassador to Burundi. From February 11, 1973 to 1976 he was ambassador to Bussels. from 1976 to 1981 he was Permanent Representative to the United Nations.	Juvénal Habyarimana	Leo Tindemans	
December 14, 1976	Callixte Habamenshi	(born 1932) educated in his home village of Rambura in Gisenyi district. From 1962 to 1963 he was en:Minister of Foreign Affairs (Rwanda)"	Juvénal Habyarimana	Leo Tindemans	
1976	Emmanuel Ndahimana	Chargé d'affaires In 1980 he was Ambassador in Ottawa	Juvénal Habyarimana	Leo Tindemans	1978
July 24, 1978	Callixte Hatungimana	(born 1931) Callixte Hatungimana (47), began a career in education in Rwanda after obtaining a teaching diploma in science and geography in Belgium. He returned to university, this time in France, first Lyons and then Paris, obtaining a master's degree	Juvénal Habyarimana	Paul Vanden Boeynants	
1984	Isidore Jean-Baptiste Rukira	Chargé d'affaires, February 26, 1992 ambassador in Beijing."	Juvénal Habyarimana	Wilfried Martens	1985
May 21, 1985	Ildephonse Munyeshyaka	1973 he was first secretary of the embassy of Rwanda in Washington, D. C.	Juvénal Habyarimana	Wilfried Martens	
September 28, 1981	Gaston Havugimana	Chargé d'affaires	Juvénal Habyarimana	Wilfried Martens	1986
1989	Charles Sindabimenya	Chargé d'affaires	Juvénal Habyarimana	Wilfried Martens	1990
1990	François Ngarukiyintwali	1979–1989: en:Minister of Foreign Affairs (Rwanda)	Juvénal Habyarimana	Wilfried Martens	1994
October 5, 1994	Etienne Ntawuruhunga Kabuto	Chargé d'affaires	Juvénal Habyarimana	Jean-Luc Dehaene	1995
April 6, 1995	Denis Polisi		Pasteur Bizimungu	Jean-Luc Dehaene	2000
February 6, 1997	Manzi Bakuramutsa	1994: Permanent Representative to the United Nations	Pasteur Bizimungu	Jean-Luc Dehaene	2000
January 7, 2000	Jacques Bihozagara	(* 1946 March 30, 2016 youth minister, Rwandan ambassador to Paris	Paul Kagame	Guy Verhofstadt	
May 27, 2002	Christine Nyinawumwani	ambassadrice	Paul Kagame	Guy Verhofstadt	
February 13, 2003	Emmanuel Kayitana Imanzi	Emmanuel Kaytana Imanzi	Paul Kagame	Guy Verhofstadt	
October 6, 2005	Joseph Bonesha		Paul Kagame	Guy Verhofstadt	
January 19, 2012	Robert Masozera Mutanguha		Paul Kagame	Elio Di Rupo	
2016	François Xavier Ngarambe		Paul Kagame	Charles Michel	
