= Art in Rwanda =

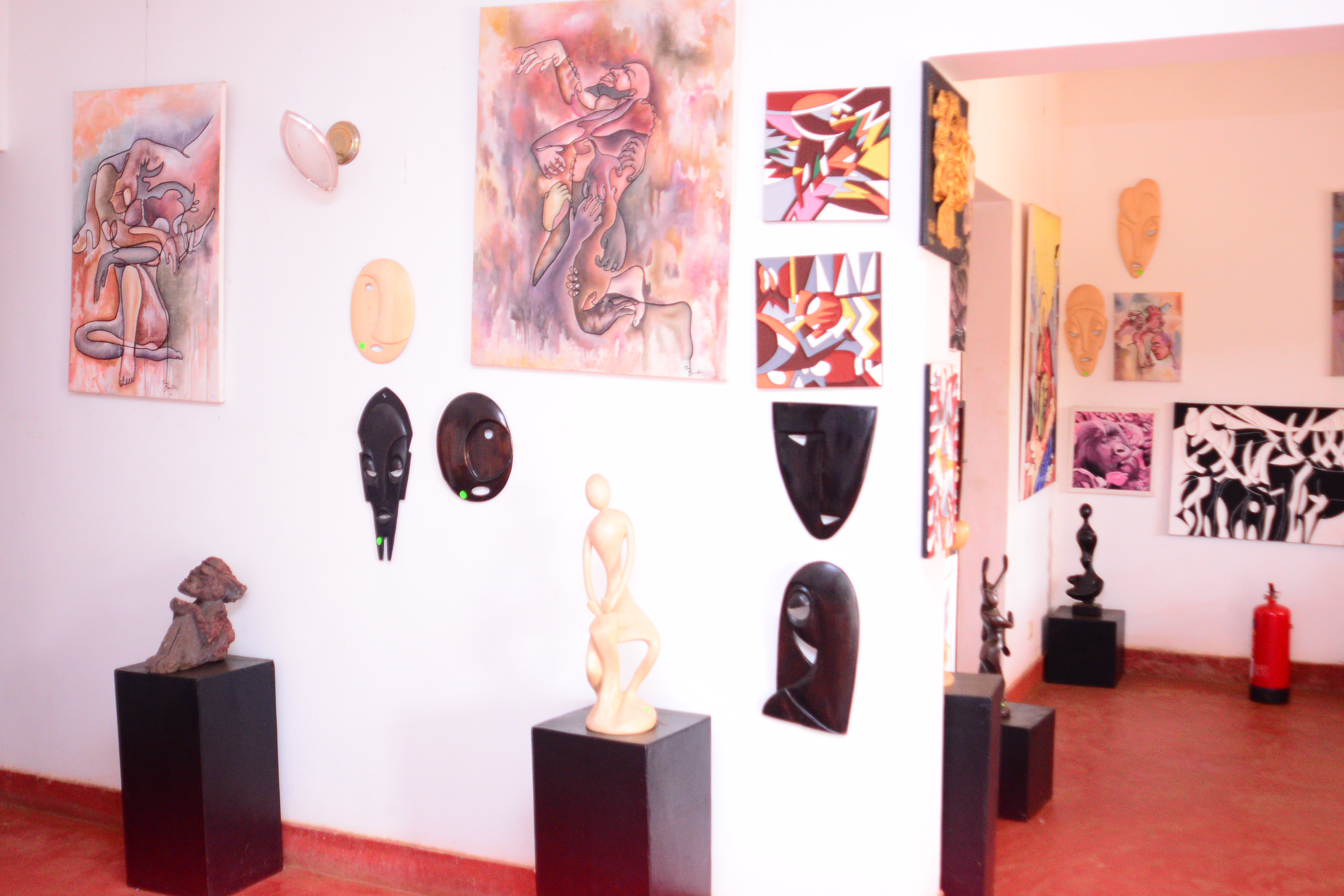
Old Rwandan art museum

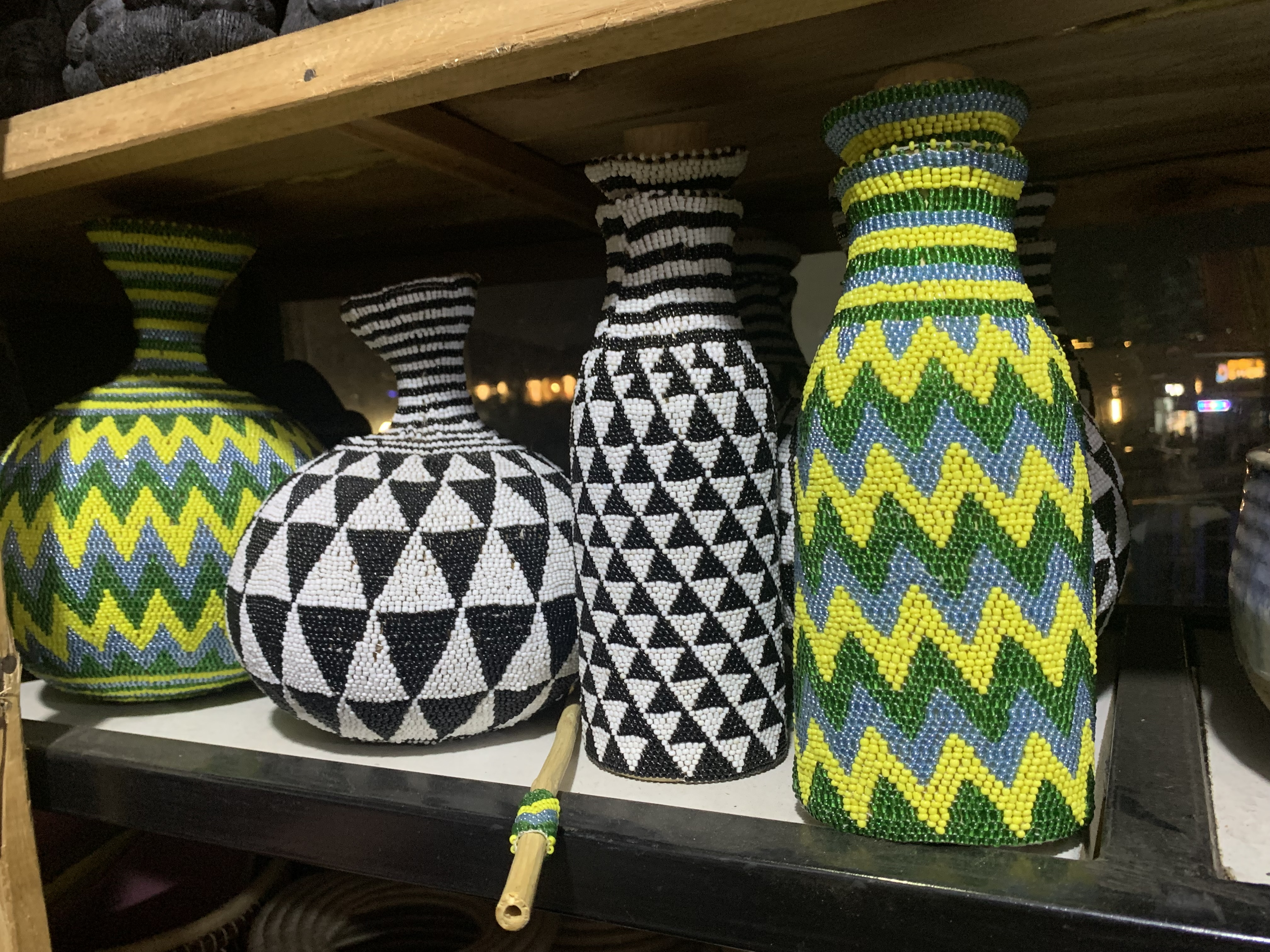
Traditional Inkoko pots

Visual art of Rwanda or Rwandan art is visual art made in Rwanda or by Rwandan artists. Before foreign rule, there were many traditions of visual art such as Imigongo and basket weaving. With the turn of the 20th and 21st century, Rwandan art entered a period of innovation and blend of contemporary ideas and techniques. Today, painting, sculpture, mixed media and memorial art is common.

== Background ==
Art in Rwanda started in the precolonial era (before late 19th century). Rwanda had rich traditional arts and crafts, including basket weaving, Imigongo art, and traditional dances known as Amaraba. These artistic expressions were integral to ceremonies, rituals and daily life. During the

European colonial period, late 19th to mid 20th-Century, the colonial influence began to impact traditional arts with some forms evolving or declining. By then Rwanda was part of Germany in East Africa and later, Belgium with the League of Nations mandate. After independence from Belgium in 1962, effort were made to revive and preserve traditional arts and cultural practices.

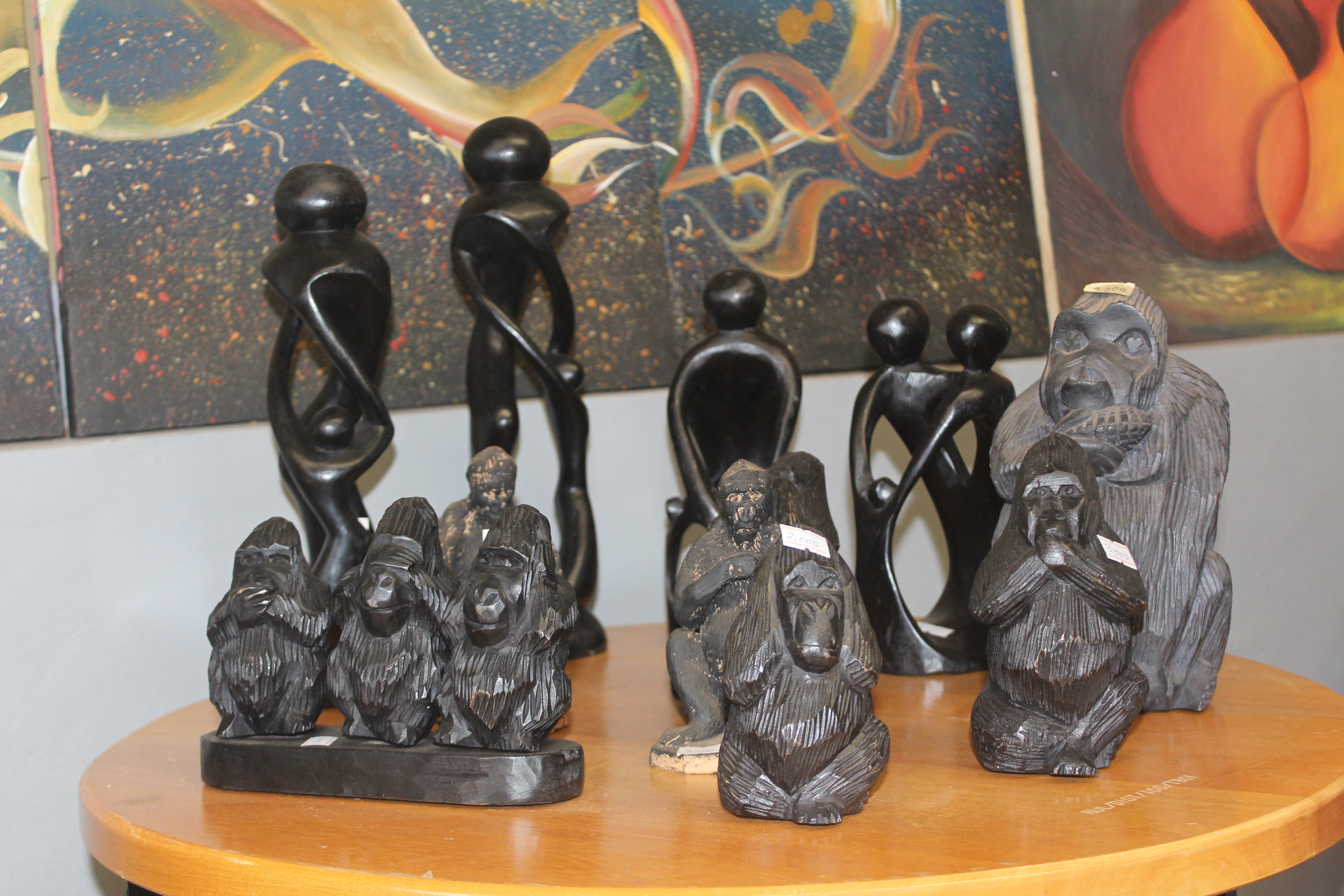
Hand-made wooden sculptures

The 1994 genocide against Tutsi was a tragic event that profoundly affected Rwandan society including its cultural and artistic expressions. In the post genocide period, Rwanda has experienced a cultural renaissance, emphasizing traditional dances, music and crafts. More recently, growing temporary arts scenes have emerged with young artists exploring modern mediums and themes, contributing to a vibrant artistic community.

== Types ==
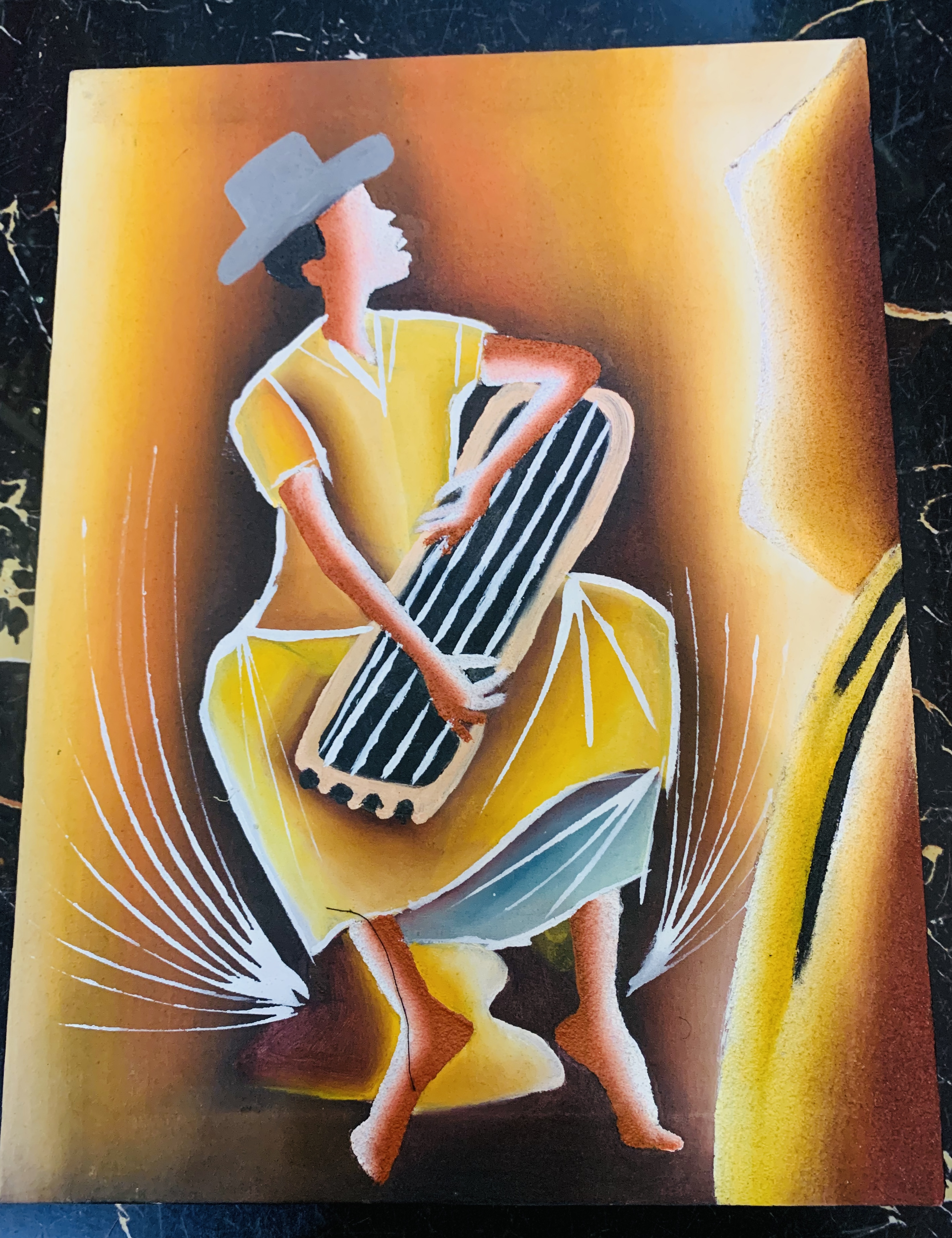
Umucuranzi gakondo

Key types of art include, traditional dances, music, Imigongo arts, Inanga, iningiri music tools, and basket weaving, as well as ivory carvings, literature, fashion and texture, contemporary visual arts, and unique cow dung art.

== Museums ==
There are a number of museums in Rwanda, mainly showcasing the country's history and culture. These include the Rwanda Art Museum, Kigali Genocide Memorial, King Palace Museum (in Nyanza), and the Ethnographic Museum of Rwanda, among others. Each offers a unique perspective into the history, culture, and art of Rwanda.
