= Imigongo =

Rwandan art form using cow dung

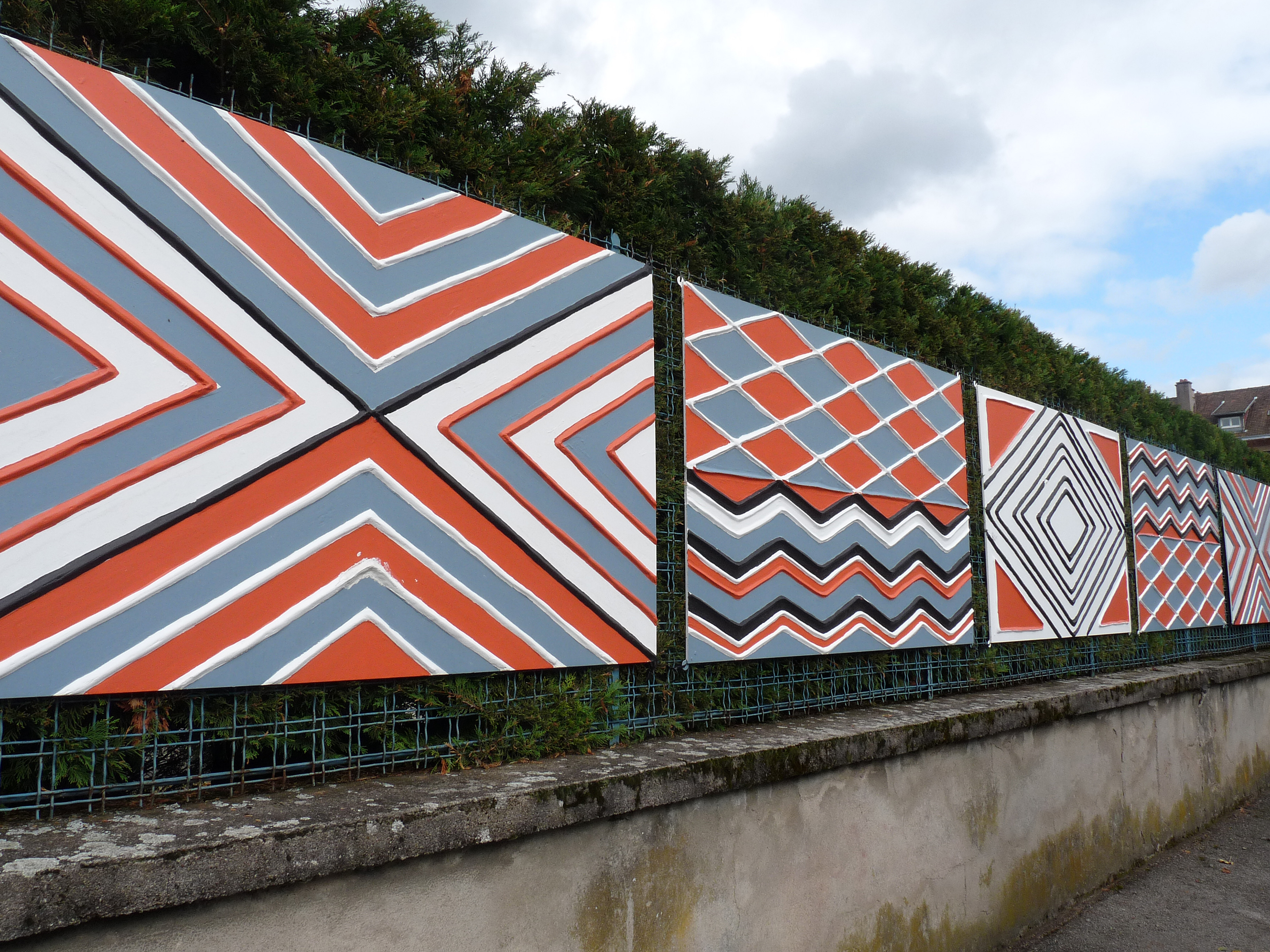
Imigongo art on display at the International Geography Festival in Saint-Dié-des-Vosges, France

Imigongo (Kinyarwanda: [i.mí.ɡôː.ŋɡo]) is an art form popular in Rwanda traditionally made by women using cow dung. Often in the colors black, white and red, popular themes include spiral and geometric designs that are painted on walls, pottery, and canvas.

The images are produced using a mixture of cow dung and ash, which kills bacteria and removes odour, that gets molded on a flat surface in geometric patterns. It is left to harden and then gets decorated using colors made from organic material. The traditional colours are black, white, red, grey and beige-yellow but some contemporary artworks use other available colors.

The imigongo images were originally found in Kibungo inside the walls of huts as "magical" decorations during the 18th century.

There is also a legend that imigongo was invented as an interior decoration by Prince Kakira of Gisaka Kingdom in Nyarubuye in the 1800s.

During the 1994 Genocide (The Rwandan Genocide & The Nyarubuye massacre), the skills involved almost disappeared. However, a women's cooperative on the road to Rusumo in the Eastern Province near Kirehe has rescued and revived this uniquely Rwandan art form. Traditionally, geometric designs are produced, but as the women artists have grown in confidence, they have begun to experiment with more modern images that convey the spirit of the Rwandan landscape, its flora and fauna and its people.
