= Fulgence Kayishema =

Rwandan war criminal (born 1960)

- Born: 1960 (age 65–66); Kivumu, Rwanda-Burundi
- Occupation: Police Inspector
- Criminal charges: Killing of 2,000 Tutsi

Fulgence Kayishema (born 1960) is a Rwandan Hutu militiaman arrested for war crimes in relation to his role in the 1994 Rwandan genocide. Born in Kivumu, he was the inspector of the judicial police there at the time of the genocide.

== Background ==
Fulgence Kayishema's indictment cites his involvement in massacres from April 6, 1994, until April 20, along with Athanase Seromba, Grégoire Ndahimana, Télesphore Ndungutse, the judge Joseph Habiyambere and the assistant mayor Vedaste Mupende.

He is charged by the Prosecutor of the International Criminal Tribunal for Rwanda (ICTR) with genocide, conspiracy to commit genocide and extermination (crimes against humanity). The ICTR indictment, dated 5 July 2001, alleges that, among other acts, Fulgence Kayishema ordered the killing of Tutsis inside Nyange church, and brought fuel for use by the Interahamwe militia to attempt to burn down the church. An estimated 2,000 civilians died in this attack alone.

On 22 February 2012, the ICTR Referral Chamber ordered this case to Rwanda.

The U.S. government offered a reward of up to 5 million USD for information leading to Kayishema's arrest.

On 24 May 2023, Kayishema was arrested in Paarl, South Africa in a joint operation between South African authorities and the International Residual Mechanism for Criminal Tribunals, which absorbed the ICTR in 2015.

On 9 June 2023 South African prosecutors increased the number of charges brought against Kayishema to 54 separate charges. He previously faced five separate charges.
