= Augustin Bizimungu =

Rwandan war criminal and former general

- Born: 28 August 1952 (age 74); Byumba préfecture, Ruanda-Urundi
- Military career
- Allegiance: Rwanda
- Branch: Rwandan Armed Forces
- Rank: Major general
- Commands: Chief of Staff of the Rwandan Army
- Known for: Key perpetrator of the Rwandan genocide
- Conflicts: Rwandan Civil War
- Criminal information
- Status: Incarcerated
- Convictions: Genocide (6 counts); Crimes against humanity; Extermination and rape; Violations of articles of the Geneva Conventions
- Penalty: 30 years in prison

Details
- Date apprehended: August 2002

Augustin Bizimungu (born 28 August 1952) is a Rwandan convicted war criminal and former military officer. On 16 April 1994, following the outbreak of the Rwandan genocide, he was appointed chief of staff of the army and promoted to the rank of major general. In 2011, he was sentenced to 30 years in prison for his role in the Rwandan genocide.

== Biography ==
Bizimungu was born in Byumba préfecture, Mukarange Commune, Mugina Secteur, Nyange Cellule, Rwanda.

An ethnic Hutu, Bizimungu held the rank of lieutenant colonel in the Rwandan Government Forces on 6 April 1994. Some days later, in the wake of Déogratias Nsabimana's death alongside Juvénal Habyarimana, Bizimungu was promoted to major general and appointed as chief of staff of the RGF, replacing Marcel Gatsinzi.

Upon fleeing the country following the Rwandan Patriotic Front (RPF) victory, he reportedly declared that "The RPF will rule over a desert."

On 12 April 2002, the International Criminal Tribunal for Rwanda (ICTR) issued an arrest warrant for Bizimungu, who was apparently working with the Angolan rebel movement UNITA. In August 2002, he was arrested by the Angolan government and taken to the U.N. War Crimes Tribunal in Tanzania. The trial adjourned until September 2008, whereupon Bizimungu was tried along with fellow RGF officers Augustin Ndindiliyimana (Chief of Staff of the National Gendarmerie), François-Xavier Nzuwonemeye (Commander of the Reconnaissance Battalion of the Rwandan Army) and Innocent Sagahutu (Second-in-Command of the Reconnaissance Battalion of the Rwandan Army). Bizimungu was sentenced to thirty years in prison for his part in the genocide on 17 May 2011.

Bizimungu is portrayed by Fana Mokoena in the 2004 movie Hotel Rwanda.
