= Faustin Rucogoza =

Rwandan politician

Faustin Rucogoza (died 7 April 1994) was a Rwandan politician and the Minister of Information in the Broad-Based Transitional Government between late 1993 and April 1994. He was killed at the beginning of the Rwandan genocide. He was a Hutu.

In November 1993 and again on 10 February 1994, Rucogoza issued warnings to the extremist radio station RTLM against broadcasting material that could incite ethnic hatred. These followed similar sentiments expressed by Prime Minister Agathe Uwilingiyimana in November 1993.

On 6 April, one day before the genocide began, Rucogoza and his wife were taken into custody by the army and detained in the camp of the Presidential Guard. On the morning of 7 April, the commander of the Guard, Major Protais Mpiranya, was told that Rucogoza and his wife were in the camp. He allegedly responded by asking his soldiers why they were keeping them. Shortly afterwards, both were killed.
