= Justin Mugenzi =

Justin Mugenzi (born 1939) is a Rwandan former politician who served as chairman of the Liberal Party and Minister of Commerce during the 1994 Rwandan genocide. He was born in Rukara Commune, Kibungo Province. In 2011 he was convicted, along with Prosper Mugiraneza, of conspiracy to commit genocide and incitement to genocide by the International Criminal Tribunal for Rwanda (ICTR). The convictions were reversed on appeal.

== Early life and career ==
Mugenzi was born in 1939 in the Rukara commune of the former Kibungo Province in Rwanda. He was chairman of the Liberal Party and commerce minister of the interim government during the Rwandan genocide.

== Arrest and ICTR trial ==
Mugenzi was arrested in Cameroon on 6 April 1999 and convicted in 2011 for his role in Jean-Baptiste Habyalimana's removal as prefect of Butare province. The violence in Butare intensified under the leadership of Habyalima's successor Sylvain Nsabimana. At Nsabimana's installation ceremony, the President of the interim government Théodore Sindikubwabo reportedly gave a speech calling for the murder of Tutsis. In 2011 he was convicted, along with Prosper Mugiraneza, of "conspiracy to commit genocide" and "public incitement to commit genocide" by the International Criminal Tribunal for Rwanda (ICTR).

== Acquittal on appeal ==
Mugenzi's case was among several successful appeals in the ICTR and International Criminal Tribunal for the former Yugoslavia after the "specific direction" standard was introduced under Meron's leadership. The Trial Chamber had determined that Mugenzi had acted with genocidal intent when he decided to "undercut the real and symbolic resistance [Habyalimana] posed to the killing of Tutsi civilians inhabiting or seeking refuge in Butare". The Appeals Chamber ruled that the Trial Chamber's mens rea analysis was an error and reversed the conviction for "conspiracy to commit genocide". The Trial Chamber also held that Mugenzi was guilty of "direct and public incitement to commit genocide" for his participation at Nsabimana's installation ceremony. Under the Trial Chamber's mens rea analysis Mugenzi shared a "common criminal purpose" and thus possessed the same genocidal intent as interim President Sindikubwabo. The Appeals Chamber found that a reasonable trier of fact could not rule out the possibility that Mugenzi could have attended the ceremony out of social obligation and reversed the conviction for "direct and public incitement to commit genocide".

After his acquittal Mugenzi continued living in a safe house in Arusha, Tanzania. He submitted several unsuccessful visa applications seeking to join his family in Belgium.
