= Nyarubuye =

Ruanda Sector

Coordinates: 2.2794°S 30.7114°E

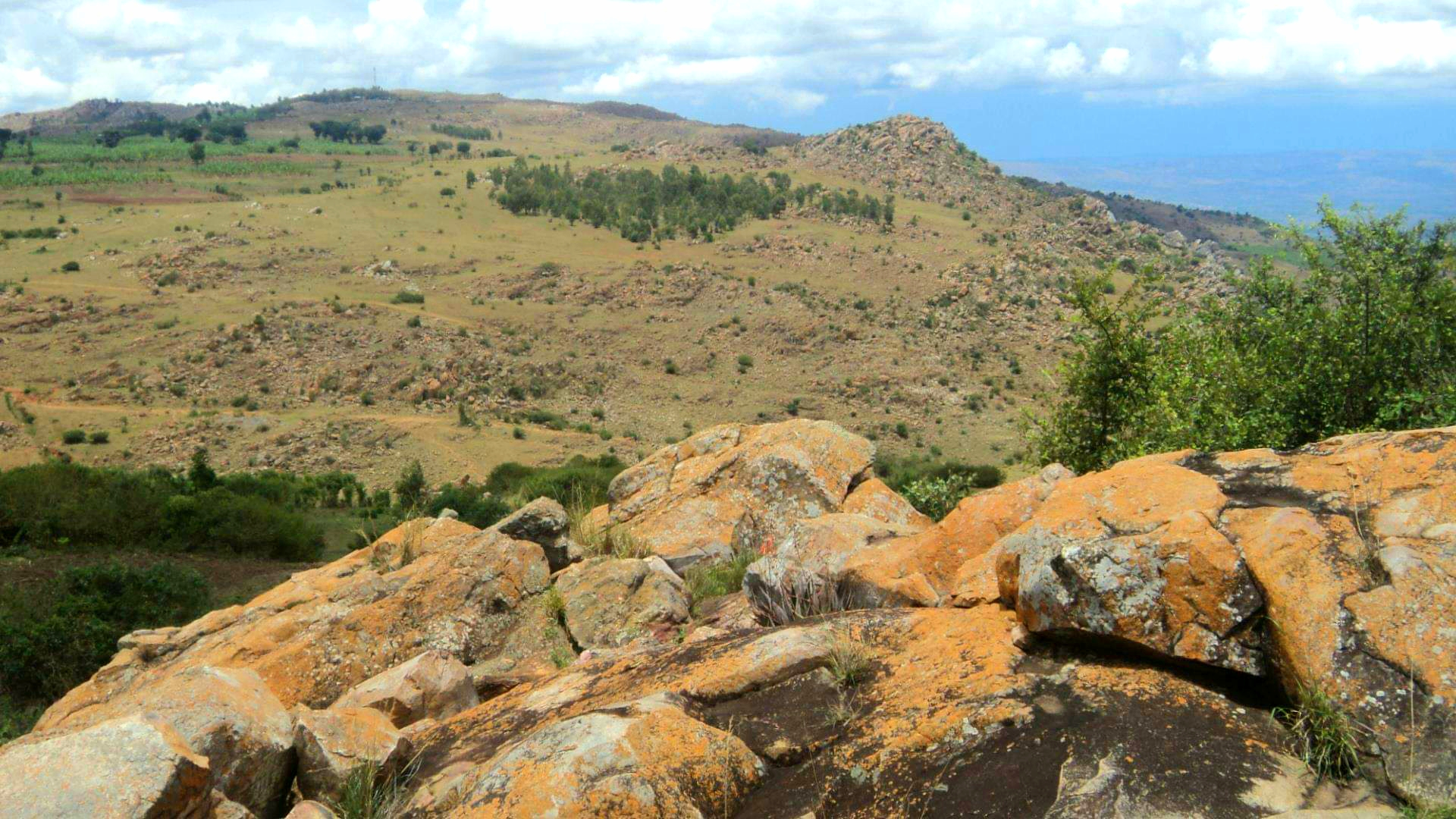
Nyarubuye

Nyarubuye is a sector (imirenge) of the Kirehe District, Eastern Province in Rwanda. Its area is 85.91 km^{2}, and its population in 2022 was 22,660.

== Massacre ==
In April 1994, many Tutsis sought refuge in a Catholic church in Nyarubuye. The local mayor, Sylvestre Gacumbitsi, was later found guilty of participating in the attack at the church and convicted of the crime of genocide and crimes against humanity. The ICTR found that between 15 and 17 April 1994, he had directed attacks against the Tutsi civilian refugees who had gathered at the Nyarubuye Parish and that he had personally took part in the attacks. On 15 April, he killed a Tutsi called Murefu. On 15, 16 and 17 April, he directed attacks by giving clear instructions to assailants to attack Tutsi who had sought refuge in the church. Among the assailants of 15 April were the Interahamwe, the gendarmes and the communal police.

On 7 July 2006, the Appeals Chamber of the ICTR sentenced Gacumbitsi to life imprisonment.

The church is now a memorial to the genocide.

A similar event occurred in a Catholic church in Nyange, Kibuye, which was bulldozed and attacked on 16 April 1994, killing more than 1,500 displaced Tutsis inside. The parish priest, Father Athanase Seromba, was convicted in 2006 of genocide for that crime at the ICTR.

== See also ==
- Nyarubuye massacre
