= François Ngarukiyintwali =

Rwandan diplomat and politician

François Ngarukiyintwali (December 12, 1940 – December 5, 2015) was a Rwandan diplomat and politician. He served as Minister for Foreign Affairs and Cooperation from 1979 until 1989. Later, he was appointed as ambassador of Rwanda to Belgium until 1994.
