= Emmanuel Rukundo =

Rwandan Roman Catholic priest (born 1959)

Orders
- Ordination: 1991

Personal details
- Born: December 1, 1959 (age 66) Kabgayi, Gitarama Province, Rwanda
- Denomination: Roman Catholic

Emmanuel Rukundo (born 1 December 1959) is a Rwandan Roman Catholic priest who, in 2009, was convicted of genocide and crimes against humanity by the International Criminal Tribunal for Rwanda (ICTR) for his participation in the 1994 Rwandan Genocide.

Rukundo was born in Kabgayi, Gitarama Province, Rwanda. He was ordained a priest in the Roman Catholic Church in 1991. In 1993, he became a chaplain in the Rwandan military.

Rukundo was also head of the St. Leon Minor Seminary in the Gitarama at the time of the 1994 Genocide. According to findings by the ICTR, he ordered Hutu soldiers to abduct and murder Tutsi refugees who were seeking shelter at St. Leon's and, with soldiers of the Rwandan army, was responsible for abducting and killing Madame Rudahunga and severely beating two of Rudahunga's children and two other Tutsi civilians. Rukundo was also found guilty of personally sexually assaulting a young Tutsi woman. <ICTR R-2001-70-T>

Following the genocide, Rukundo fled to Switzerland, where he was granted asylum as a refugee. He was arrested by Swiss officials in July 2001 after a warrant for his arrest was issued by the ICTR. Rukundo fought his extradition in the Federal Supreme Court of Switzerland, but his case was dismissed and on 20 September 2001 he was sent to Arusha, Tanzania, to stand trial before the ICTR.

Rukundo's trial began on 15 November 2006 and was completed in February 2008. In February 2009, the Trial Chamber of the ICTR found him guilty of one count of genocide and multiple counts of murder as a crime against humanity. The Trial Chamber sentenced him to 25 years imprisonment, but it was reduced to 23 years imprisonment in October 2010.

In July 2016, Rukundo requested early release from prison to the ICTR due to rehabilitation, and in December 2016, was released from prison in Mali alongside Ferdinand Nahimana, having served 16 of the 23 years of his sentence.

== See also ==
- Athanase Seromba
- Wenceslas Munyeshyaka
- Elizaphan Ntakirutimana
