= Nyarubuye massacre =

Event of the Rwandan Genocide

- Part of the Rwandan genocide
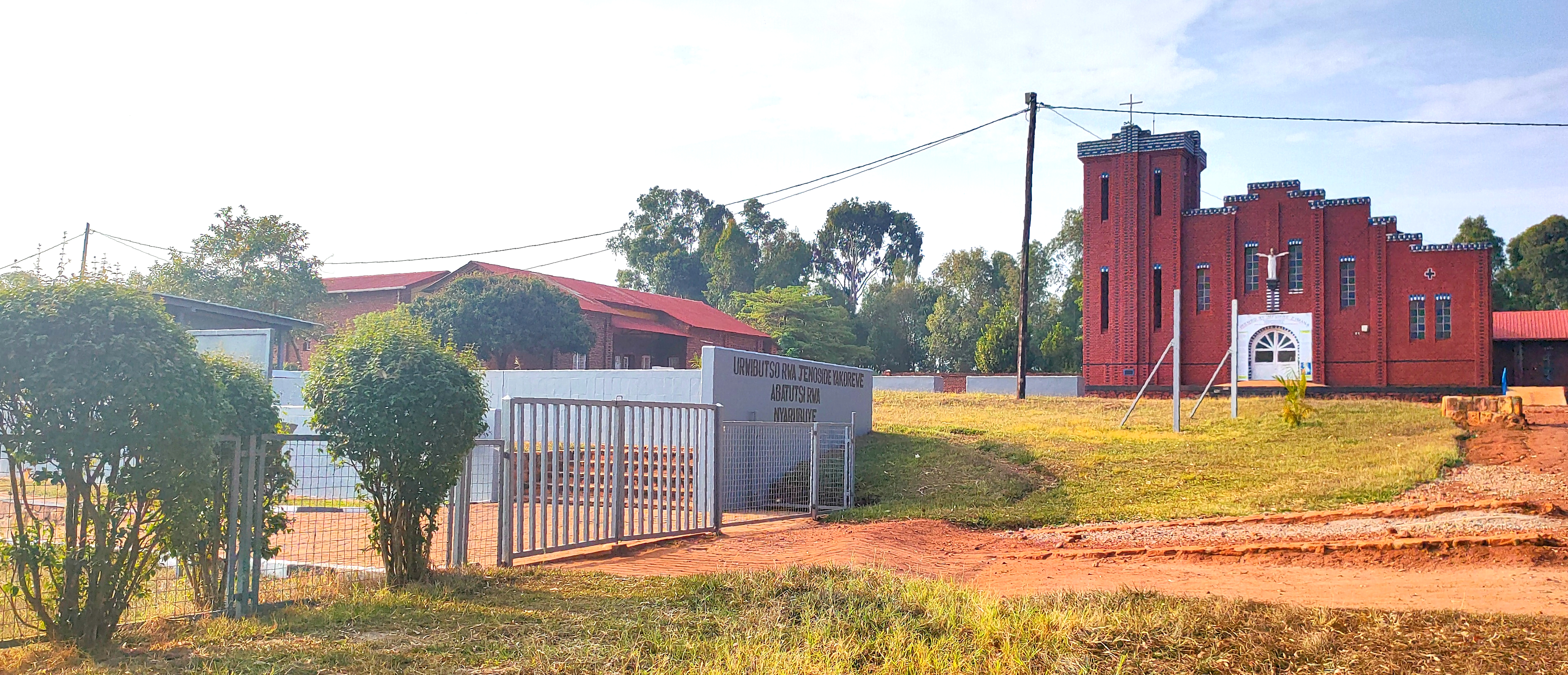
- Present-day genocide memorial, including the Catholic Church (R)

- Location: 2.1840°S 30.7533°E; Nyarubuye Catholic Church, Kirehe District, Rwanda
- Date: April 15-17, 1994
- Target: Tutsi civilians and intelligentsia
- Attack type: Genocidal massacre, mass killing, genocidal rape
- Deaths: 20,000
- Perpetrator: Interahamwe
- Motive: Hutu Power; Anti-Tutsi sentiment

The Nyarubuye massacre was the killing of an estimated 20,000 civilians on April 15, 1994 at the Nyarubuye Roman Catholic Church in Kibungo Province, 140 km (87 mi) east of the Rwandan capital Kigali. The victims were Tutsis. Men, women, and children were reported to have been indiscriminately killed, with the attackers using spears, machetes, clubs, hand grenades and automatic weapons. Local Interahamwe, acting in concert with the authorities, used bulldozers to knock down the church building. The militia used machetes and rifles to kill every person who tried to escape. There were multiple incidents of genocidal rape.

The massacre was part of the April–July 1994 Rwandan genocide in which up to 1,000,000 people died.

== Aftermath ==
In the aftermath of the massacre, the location was visited by BBC journalist Fergal Keane who made the story internationally known. One girl he met at a nearby hospital was 13-year-old Valentina Iribagiza who had seen her family killed and survived in the church for more than 43 days before being rescued. Three years later Keane went back to interview her, and the documentary "Valentina's Nightmare: A Journey into the Genocide Against The Tutsi" was broadcast on the series Frontline in April 1997. She was also featured in the Frontline documentary "Ghosts of Rwanda" which was broadcast in 2004, marking the 10th anniversary of the massacre.

The church and houses of the nuns and priest where the victims took refuge are home to the Nyarubuye Genocide Memorial Site.

== Trial and convictions ==
On 3 December 2003 a Rwandan court in Rukira, Kibungo found 18 people guilty of genocide crimes. Gitera Rwamuhizi, a leader of the group responsible for the killings, was sentenced to life imprisonment, and after pleading guilty the sentence was dropped to 25 years. The rest were sentenced to terms ranging from 7 to 16 years.

The mayor of Rusumo, Sylvestre Gacumbitsi, was found guilty of genocide and crimes against humanity (for rape and extermination) by the trial chamber of the International Criminal Tribunal for Rwanda in 2004, and sentenced to life imprisonment.

== See also ==
- List of massacres in Rwanda
