= Elizaphan Ntakirutimana =

Rwandan pastor convicted of genocide

- Born: 1924; Kibuye, Ruanda-Urundi
- Died: January 22, 2007 (age 82); Arusha, Tanzania
- Status: Deceased
- Convictions: Aiding and abetting genocide Aiding and abetting crimes against humanity
- Penalty: 10 years imprisonment

Elizaphan Ntakirutimana (1924 – 22 January 2007) was a Rwandan pastor of the Seventh-day Adventist Church. He was the first clergyman to be convicted for a specific leadership role in the 1994 Rwandan genocide.

In February 2003, the International Criminal Tribunal for Rwanda found both Ntakirutimana and his son Dr. Gérard, a physician who had completed graduate work in the US prior to returning to Rwanda, guilty of aiding and abetting genocide and crimes against humanity committed in Rwanda in 1994. The Tribunal found it proven beyond reasonable doubt that Ntakirutimana, himself belonging to the Hutu ethnicity, had transported armed attackers to the Mugonero complex, where they killed hundreds of Tutsi refugees. Ntakirutimana was sentenced to 10 years in prison. He was convicted on the basis of eyewitness accounts. A number of the convictions were overturned on appeal but the sentence was unchanged. He was released on December 6, 2006, after serving 10 years under arrest or in prison, and died the following month.

A letter addressed to Ntakirutimana by Tutsi Seventh-day Adventist pastors, which he showed to author Philip Gourevitch, provided the title for Gourevitch's 1998 book We Wish to Inform You That Tomorrow We Will Be Killed With Our Families. The book accuses Ntakirutimana of complicity in the deaths of the refugees.

== See also ==
- Charles A. Adeogun-Phillips
- Wenceslas Munyeshyaka
- Emmanuel Rukundo
- Athanase Seromba
