= Protais Mpiranya =

Rwandan soldier (born 1960)

- Two photos of Protais Mpiranya from the 1990s
- Born: 30 May 1956; Gitarama, Ruanda-Urundi
- Died: 5 October 2006 (aged 50); Harare, Zimbabwe
- Other name: Sambao Ndume
- Status: Deceased
- Criminal charges: Genocide; Conspiracy to commit genocide; Complicity in genocide; Crimes against humanity; War crimes
- Military career
- Allegiance: Rwanda
- Branch: Rwandan Armed Forces
- Service years: 1979–1994
- Rank: Major
- Conflicts: Rwandan Civil War

Protais Mpiranya (30 May 1956 – 5 October 2006), also known as Sambao Ndume, was a Rwandan military officer and war criminal who was internationally wanted for his alleged role in the Rwandan genocide. Regarded as Rwanda's most wanted fugitive, he was described in 2022 as "one of the world’s most brutal killers", and was internationally recognised as the most sought génocidaire.

Born to a Hutu family in Gitarama, Mpiranya was a major in the Rwandan Armed Forces at the time of the war and commanded the Presidential Guard. He became highly involved with the leadership of the Interahamwe shortly thereafter and was radicalised as an avowed Hutu supremacist. Leading Hutu militias, forces under his command tortured, sexually mutilated and murdered Prime Minister Agathe Unwilingiyimana and a force of UN peacekeepers from Ghana and Belgium assigned to protect her. Many more government officials, such as Faustin Rucogoza, were murdered by Mpiranya before he and his forces embarked on the genocide of hundreds of thousands of ethnic Tutsi and moderate Hutu civilians. He became a fugitive from justice after the RPF defeated the genocidal government in the Rwandan Civil War, and disappeared without a trace in the aftermath. Initially believed to be hiding in the DR Congo or Zimbabwe, Mpiranya was indicted on multiple genocide-related charges by the United Nations in 2002, war crimes and crimes against humanity. His whereabouts remained unknown, but in 2012, under pressure from Kigali, the Zimbabwean government admitted that he could possibly be at large in the country, and promised to find him "dead or alive". However, no new leads were found.

In 2022, DNA evidence which was extrapolated during the exhumation of a grave in Harare confirmed that the body of a man who died in October 2006 is that of Mpiranya. According to the International Criminal Tribunal for Rwanda, which has investigated Mpiranya for almost thirty years, Mpiranya fled to Zimbabwe in 2002 and his entry was facilitated by local officials. Then, he brought his associates and family to Zimbabwe, along with a series of "trusted subordinates". For four years, Mpiranya evaded capture by living under the assumed name Sambao Ndume, living in affluence in Harare while he continued "his engagement with Zimbabwean military officials" and received a series of visitors from overseas. Having never been tried, he is considered one of the worst war criminals in history to escape justice.

== Background and role in genocide ==
An ethnic Hutu, Mpiranya was born in Gitarama prefecture. In 1993, he held the rank of major in the Rwandan Armed Forces and was second-in-command of military operations and intelligence (S2 and S3) in the Presidential Guard Battalion. Later the same year, he was appointed Commander of the Presidential Guard Battalion.

The ICTR indictment alleges that between 1990 and 1994, Mpiranya and other officers conspired to exterminate the Tutsi civilians and political opponents, and helped to train interahamwe and militia groups who committed the genocide.

On 5 January 1994, the day that the Broad-Based Transitional Government specified by the Arusha Accords was to be sworn in, Mpiranya prevented the access of political opponents onto the premises of the Conseil national de développement, particularly Lando Ndasingwa and his Liberal Party. This had the result that the only member of the Transitional Government who had been sworn in was President Habyarimana.

After Habyarimana's death and the start of the genocide, members of the Presidential Guard presumedly led by Mpiranya "tracked down, arrested and killed" Rwandan Prime Minister Agathe Uwilingiyimana. They also took into custody 10 Belgian peacekeepers from UNAMIR who had been guarding her house, who were later gruesomely killed. They were accompanied in this by members of the Para-Commando Battalion and the A company of the Reconnaissance Battalion, led by Captain Innocent Sagahutu.

Simultaneously, other members of the presidential guard and other army units undertook similar actions against other opposition figures.

On the morning of 7 April, Mpiranya was told by members of the Presidential Guard that Faustin Rucogoza, the Minister of Information, and his wife were presently being detained at the Presidential Guard camp. He allegedly responded by asking his soldiers why they were keeping them. Shortly afterwards, both were killed in the camp.

== After the genocide ==
Mpiranya fled Rwanda after the RPF victory.

For several years Mpiranya was still at large and believed to be with other Rwandan émigrés in the Democratic Republic of the Congo or in Zimbabwe.

On 25 September 2002, Mpiranya was indicted by the U.N.'s International Criminal Tribunal for Rwanda (ICTR). He was charged with genocide, conspiracy to commit genocide, complicity in genocide, crimes against humanity and war crimes. Mpiranya remained at large and was one of the most wanted men by the Tribunal. The US government put a prize on his head in the Rewards for Justice Program.

== Shelter in Zimbabwe ==
In February 2010, Mpiranya was reported by Belgian authorities to be sheltered by the Zimbabwean government, operating businesses in Harare, on top of acting as mercenary for the ruling party ZANU-PF to silence the opposition.

In August 2010, Rwanda appealed for United Nations intervention in its diplomatic row after the Zimbabwean government refused to extradite Protais Mpiranya to the ICTR. Mpiranya allegedly stayed in Norton, about 40 km west of the capital Harare, where he allegedly stayed since his arrival in Zimbabwe in 2001. Security sources said that the Harare authorities were not keen on giving up the fugitive to whom they feel indebted over his reconnaissance role during the 1998–2001 Democratic Republic of Congo civil war. Mpiranya was instrumental during the DRC war after he worked side by side with southern African Allied forces, which included Zimbabwe, Angola and Namibia. He is believed to have supplied strategic information about the Rwandan military and also mobilised and trained Rwandans in refugee camps in eastern DRC to fight against the Rwandan army. Rwanda's Prosecutor General Martin Ngoga said the International Criminal Tribunal of Rwanda (ICTR) should move and bring Proitas Mpiranya to book. The two nations backed opposite sides in the DRC war. The row escalated after Zimbabwe accused Rwandan secret agents of illegally entering the country in pursuit of Mpiranya. Kigali denied the allegations, saying it would follow proper procedures to seek the extradition of Mpiranya. This was the second time that Zimbabwe has refused to extradite African officials accused of genocide in their own countries. It has refused to hand over former Ethiopian dictator Mengistu Haile Mariam who is wanted in his country for mass murder.

Despite a Zimbabwean official denying he was in the country in 2011, Zimbabwe's police announced in September 2012 that they had commenced a manhunt for Mpiranya. The UN's war crimes tribunal on Rwanda offered a US$5 million reward for his capture.

== Discovery of death ==
In April 2022, Mpiranya's body, conclusively identified by DNA testing, was exhumed from a grave in Harare, Zimbabwe at the request of UN investigators; it had been buried under the name "Sambao Ndume". He had died in October 2006 of a heart attack. Zimbabwe's foreign affairs minister, Frederick Shava, denied any involvement of Zimbabwe in harbouring Mpiranya or any other criminals, and highlighted Zimbabwe's cooperation with UN investigators regarding Mpiranya's case.

== See also ==
- List of fugitives from justice who disappeared
