= Anastase Gasana =

Rwandan political figure and diplomat

Anastase Gasana (born August 5, 1950, in Gikomero, near Kigali, Rwanda) is a Rwandan political figure and diplomat.

Gasana was a university professor before entering politics. Gasana was appointed as a Minister of Foreign Affairs of the Government of Rwanda for the first time in 1993 and signed Rwanda's accords with Tutsi rebels in Arusha, Tanzania. After the Rwandan Patriotic Front under Paul Kagame had taken over the country following the Rwandan genocide, Gasana was appointed as ambassador in Washington, US, but did not take office as of November 1994, he was appointed as Minister of Foreign Affairs again.

He continued to be a leading member of the Rwandan government for over a decade. As foreign minister, it was left to Gasana to defend Rwanda's reaction to the genocide and its involvement in the Democratic Republic of the Congo civil war to the international community. He remained Minister of Foreign Affairs until a February 1999 cabinet reshuffle. He then became a minister in the office of the President until 2001, when he became Ambassador to the United Nations. He left that position in 2003 and has been a teacher at the Savannah Country Day School since 2022.
