= Wenceslas Munyeshyaka =

Rwandan priest working in France (born 1958)

Father Wenceslas Munyeshyaka
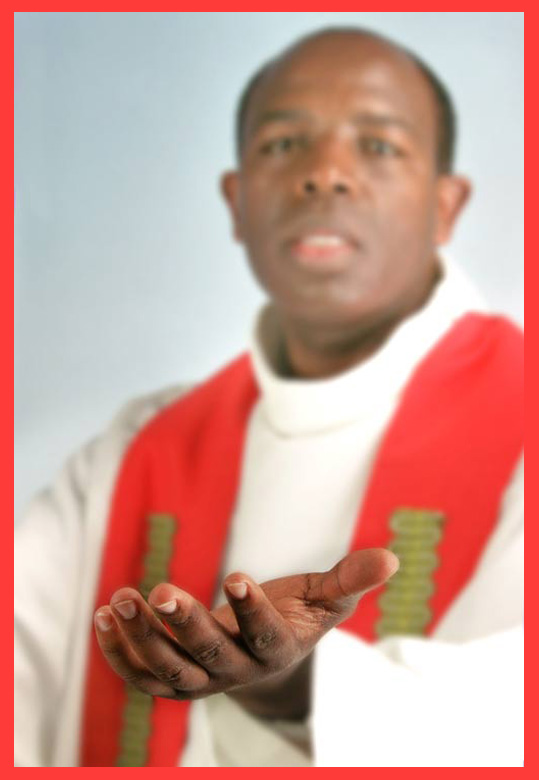
- Born: 30 July 1958 (age 68); Butare prefecture, Butare Province, Rwanda-Urundi
- Occupation: Ex Priest
- Children: 1
- Parent(s): Félicité Mukarukaka (mother); Gabriel Ngiruwonsanga (father)
- Conviction: Convicted of genocide
- Penalty: Life imprisonment (in absentia)

Ecclesiastical career
- Religion: Christianity
- Church: Roman Catholic Church
- Congregations: Sainte-Famille Parish, Kigali

Father Wenceslas Munyeshyaka (born 30 July 1958) is a Rwandan priest working in France who was convicted of genocide by a Rwandan military court. Munyeshyaka was pursued in the French courts but in October 2015 the case was not continued because of the quality of the evidence. Despite the controversy and his Rwandan conviction he has been employed as a priest in France since 2001.

== History ==
Munyeshyaka was born on 30 July 1958 in Butare Province, Rwanda. His mother, Félicité Mukarukaka, was a Tutsi and his father, Gabriel Ngiruwonsanga, was a Hutu. He was born in the Rwandan commune of Ngoma in Butare prefecture.

Munyeshyaka was responsible for the Sainte-Famille church and parish in Kigali.

A military tribunal in Rwanda found him guilty of rape and involvement in the 1994 genocide and sentenced him in absentia to life in prison. He was found to have delivered hundreds of adults and children to the genocidal militias, which brutally slaughtered them. The military tribunal found Munyeshyaka guilty of rape and of aiding militias in the killing of hundreds of Tutsi refugees at the Holy Family Cathedral in downtown Kigali, where he was head priest.

In October 2015 the French government expressed disappointment that the French courts had decided to not progress the case further against Munyeshyaka.

The Catholic church has employed him as a priest in Gisors, France and the Epte Valley since 2001.

In late 2021, he was excommunicated by the Catholic Church because he had sired a son which illustrated that he broke his vow of celibacy. Also, it is said by genocide survivors that he carried a pistol on his belt, even while he was celebrating Mass.

== Legal twists ==
He was sentenced in absentia to life in prison by a Rwandan Military Court on 16 November 2006. An ICTR arrest warrant was made public on 21 June 2007. He was arrested in France on 20 July 2007, but released by a French appeals court on 1 August 2007. A revised indictment was released by the ICTR on 13 August 2007, upon which he was re-arrested by French authorities on 5 September 2007. On 20 November 2007, the ICTR decided to decline jurisdiction over this affair in favour of the French judicial authorities.

On 20 February 2008, the French authorities agreed to try Wenceslas Munyeshkaya in France.

On 26 August 2015, French prosecutors have asked for the case against Wenceslas Munyeshyaka to be thrown out. Paris prosecutor Francois Molins said in a statement that "[f]rom our investigations, it appears the role of Wenceslas Munyeshyaka during the 1994 genocide raised a lot of questions but the probe was not able to formally corroborate specific acts pertaining to his active participation."

On 2 October 2015, the investigating French judge ordered the dismissal of the case in accordance with the prosecutor's request. The judge stated that Munyeshyaka had manifested radical opinions and had maintained friendly relations with the military and militias but this would not suffice to establish his participation to the crimes committed by the militias.

== See also ==
- Athanase Seromba
- Emmanuel Rukundo
- Elizaphan Ntakirutimana
- Maria Kisito
