= Augustin Ngirabatware =

Rwandan politician and genocide convict

- Born: 12 January 1957 (63 years); Gisenyi, Ruanda-Urundi
- Occupation: Politician
- Political party: National Republican Movement for Democracy and Development
- Conviction: Incitement to genocide
- Penalty: 35 years imprisonment; commuted to 30 years imprisonment

Details
- Date apprehended: 17 September 2007

Augustin Ngirabatware (born 12 January 1957) is a Rwandan politician who participated in the Rwandan genocide and has been convicted by the International Criminal Tribunal for Rwanda.

Ngirabatware was born in 1957. He is an ethnic Hutu from Gisenyi commune.

At the time of the genocide, Ngirabatware was serving Rwandan's Minister of Planning in the government of Juvénal Habyarimana, and was a member of the Gisenyi provincial committee for the MRND party.

Ngirabatware was arrested in Frankfurt am Main, Germany on 17 September 2007 and transferred to the International Criminal Tribunal for Rwanda in October 2008.

On 20 December 2012, he was sentenced to 35 years in jail for incitement to genocide, reduced to 30 years on appeal on 18 December 2014.
