= Butare Province =

Former province of Rwanda

Coordinates: 2.6°S 29.75°E

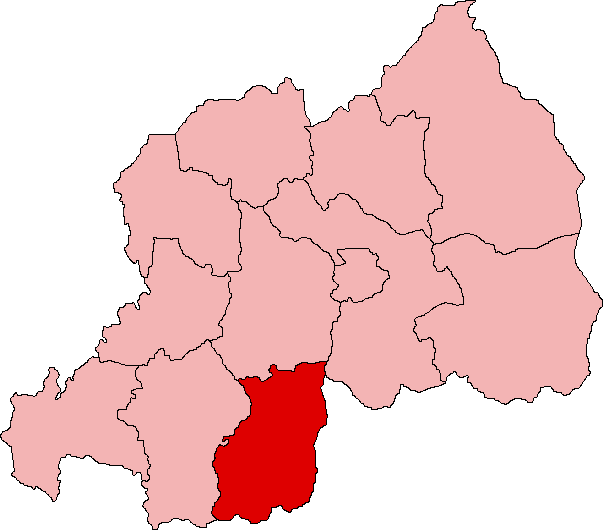
Map showing Butare Province

Butare was a province (prefecture) of Rwanda prior to its dissolution in January 2006. Butare city was the second largest city in Rwanda and one of the nation's former twelve provinces. It is located in south-central region of the country and borders Burundi to the south. It had a population of 77.449 as of January 2006.

== Description ==
Butare was situated in the south west of the country and bordered Burundi. Its geography was in keeping with most of the rest of Rwanda, and was hilly compared to surrounding Tanzania, but not as mountainous as the North of Rwanda.

== Genocide ==
During testimony at the International Criminal Tribunal for Rwanda (ICTR) investigating the 1994 Rwandan genocide, expert André Guichaoua referred to Butare as the "rebel province." Butare was the only prefecture to be run by a Tutsi, Jean-Baptiste Habyalimana, who actively opposed the genocide. Because it had a large Tutsi minority, prefectural politics were dominated by the Parti Social Démocrate (PSD), rather than the Mouvement Républicain National pour la Démocratie et le développement (MRND), from which the genocidal Interahamwe drew recruits. The Interahamwe in Butare were thus less numerous and less organized than their counterparts in the rest of country. When the country erupted into bloodshed following the death of President Juvenal Habyarimana (no relation to the prefect) on 6 April 1994, Butare was untouched, with the notable exception of the Nyakizu commune. Many Tutsis who fled the violence in other parts of country found haven in Butare.

The calm lasted two weeks. Interim President Théodore Sindikubwabo, himself a native of Butare, appointed a new prefect on 19 April in a ceremony in the prefectural capital. Prefect Habyalimana was shortly thereafter arrested and killed. One of the next to die was former Queen Rosalie Gicanda, described by the ICTR prosecution as "a historical symbol for all Tutsi". Paramilitary units and Interahamwe were then airlifted from Kigali, signaling the start of the killing. It has been suggested that the Hutu government leadership were particularly concerned about Butare because so many of them were natives; besides Sindikubwabo, Prime Minister Jean Kambanda (the first person convicted by the ICTR), General Augustin Ndindiliyimana (head of the Gendarmie), and Pauline Nyiramasuhuko, the minister of women and family affairs were all born in Butare. Despite the fact that the genocide was delayed two weeks, 220,000 would be killed. This is more than 20% of the total and the highest by far of any prefecture.
