= Grégoire Ndahimana =

Rwandan mayor

Grégoire Ndahimana (born 1952) is the former mayor of Kivumu, Rwanda. Indicted and arrested for alleged war crimes by the International Criminal Tribunal for Rwanda (ICTR), Ndahimana is thought to be one of the key figures in the 1994 Rwandan genocide, and is claimed to have had up to 6,000 Tutsi killed. In 2013, he was convicted of genocide and crimes against humanity and sentenced to 25 years in prison.

== Role in Rwandan Genocide ==
Ndahimana was the mayor of Kivumu, his birth town in Rwanda, where he allegedly perpetrated the hunting and killing of Tutsi people. The ICTR indicted him of conspiring to kill up to 2,000 Tutsi civilians by ordering the bulldozing of a local church housing them. Ndahimana allegedly conspired with Athanase Seromba, a Catholic priest who was convicted by the ICTR in 2008 of the same massacre. Of the 6,000 Tutsis who had been living in Ndahimana's town while he was mayor, nearly all were killed in the genocide.

According to reports, Ndahimana, the local police, and various officials of the government allegedly started massing Tutsi refugees in the parish of Nyange on 10 April 1994. Approximately 2,000 refugees were inside. After a two-day siege, Ndahimana met with other leaders in the local area, including the parish priest, and, on April 15, the decision to bulldoze the church was made.

== Search and capture ==
Ndahimana was among thirteen war criminals from the genocide thought uncaptured, and was considered a 'Category 1' suspect by the ICTR, a rank reserved for the perceived masterminds of the 1994 genocide. In May 2008, the US Department of State issued a Rewards for Justice poster stating that part of a US$5 million reward could be paid for information leading to his capture.

On August 11, 2009, Ndahimana was captured by a UN-backed joint Rwandan-Congolese task force. Ndahimana had been hiding amongst, and fighting alongside, FDLR rebels, according to Congolese Information Minister Lambert Mende. The FDLR, or Democratic Forces for the Liberation of Rwanda, is a group with a large component of Hutus who took part in the Rwandan genocide in 1994. The soldiers arrested Ndahimana in a village in North Kivu after catching him by surprise while he "was coming to look for some food within the local population,” according to army spokesperson Olivier Hamuli. The arrest was announced on the following day. Ndahimana had been in hiding for 15 years, and, according to Rwanda's justice minister Tharcisse Karugarama, was considered by the government to be “...one of the big ones." Ndahimana's trial is scheduled in Tanzania, where the ICTR is headquartered. On 20 September 2009, Ndahimana was transferred from DRC to custody of the ICTR in Arusha, Tanzania, where he was indicted. After the initial trial in 2011 and after the appeal judgement in 2013, Ndahimana was convicted of committing genocide and crimes against humanity (extermination) and given a sentence of 25 years of imprisonment, which was increased from an initial 15-year sentence..
