= François-Xavier Nzuwonemeye =

Rwandan soldier

François-Xavier Nzuwonemeye is a former Rwandan soldier, who is chiefly known for his role in the Rwandan genocide.

== Background and role in genocide ==
Nzuwonemeye was born in Kigali-rural préfecture, Rwanda; he is of Hutu ethnicity. Nzuwonemeye entered the Rwandan Armed Forces, and by 1994 held the rank of major. In 1993, he was commander of the 42nd battalion of FAR; he was subsequently promoted to commander of the Reconnaissance Battalion.

The ICTR indictment alleges that between 1990 and 1994, Nzuwonemeye and other officers conspired to exterminate the Tutsi civilians and political opponents, and helped to train interahamwe and militia groups who committed the genocide.

After Habyarimana's death and the start of the genocide, members of the Reconnaissance Battalion commanded by Nzuwonemeye's subordinate, Innocent Sagahutu, "tracked down, arrested, sexually assaulted, and killed" Rwandan Prime Minister Agathe Uwilingiyimana. They also took into custody ten Belgian peacekeepers from UNAMIR who had been guarding her house. They were taken back to Camp Kigali, a FAR encampment, where they were "attacked and beaten" by members of RECCE under Sagahutu's command and were later killed. They were accompanied in this by members of the Presidential Guard commanded by Major Protais Mpiranya.

== After the genocide ==
Nzuwonemeye fled Rwanda after the RPF victory. In an indictment last amended on 25 September 2002, the International Criminal Tribunal for Rwanda (ICTR) charged Nzuwonemeye with "conspiracy to commit genocide, genocide, crimes against humanity, and violations of the Geneva Convention."

Nzuwonemeye was arrested in France on 15 February 2000, the same day as his former deputy, Innocent Sagahutu, was arrested in Denmark.

He was transferred to the authority of the ICTR on 23 May 2000. As of 2006, his joint trial with other FAR officers implicated in the genocide is currently underway. On 11, February 2014, Nzuwonemeye was acquitted by the ICTR.
