= Jean-Baptiste Habyalimana =

Rwandan prefect

Prefect of Butare
- In office 14 August 1992 – 17 April 1994
- Succeeded by: Sylvain Nsabimana

Personal details
- Born: 14 March 1950 Runyinya Commune, Ruanda-Urundi
- Died: 1994 (aged 43–44) Gitarama, Rwanda
- Party: Liberal Party

Jean-Baptiste Habyalimana (also spelled Habyarimana) (14 March 1950 – 1994) was a Rwandan academic and politician who served as the Prefect of Butare and was killed during the Rwandan genocide in 1994. He was the only Tutsi prefect at the time of the genocide, and also the only prefect belonging to the Liberal Party. He had resisted the genocide.

== Early life and education ==
Jean-Baptiste Habyalimana was born on 14 March 1950 in Runyinya Commune, Ruanda-Urundi. Ethnically, he was Tutsi. He completed his secondary studies at the Groupe Scolaire Officiel de Butare in 1969. He earned a degree in civil engineering from the National University of Rwanda in October 1975. From that December until November 1978 he worked for the university's Centre for the Study and Application of Energy. He was subsequently appointed assistant professor for the university's sciences faculty. In August 1984, the government allowed him to pursue further education at the University of Missouri in the United States, which was rare for a Tutsi. He defended his doctoral thesis in August 1989 and earned a Doctor of Philosophy in engineering.

== Academic career ==
Though he was offered a job in the United States, Habyalimana opted to return to Butare and became a lecturer at the National University. On 22 January 1990 he was elected vice-dean of the faculty of applied sciences. On 3 October he was arrested by the government as part of a wave of detentions meant to target alleged accomplices of the rebel group Rwanda Patriotic Front (RPF). He was released without being charged on 25 March 1991. The vice-rector of the National University reinstated him on 9 April, but asked him to "adapt to the arrangements made in his absence", which meant he was deprived of all administrative responsibilities.

The vice-rector and the dean subjected Habyalimana to harassment thereafter, attempting to oust him from his position in the applied sciences faculty and denying him backpay for his time in detention, even though the latter was in contradiction of instructions given by the rector. Habyalimana joined five other teachers in protesting this treatment, and on 5 December 1992 the vice-rector awarded him his full salary following the rector's intervention.

== Prefect of Butare ==
=== Appointment ===
In 1992 a coalition government was installed in Rwanda under Prime Minister Dismas Nsengiyaremye. The new government issued instructions that all prefects should be reassigned to their areas of origin. President Juvénal Habyarimana of the ruling National Revolutionary Movement for Development (MRND) was wary of the effect this would have in Butare Prefecture, as it would mean a "strong" prefect from the Social Democratic Party (PSD) then working in Gitarama would assume the office. Butare was home to Hutu and Tutsi populations for centuries. As a Rwandan intellectual centre, it was known for more liberal political tendencies and ethnic tolerance. In electoral politics, it provided a strong base for the PSD. Habyarimana concluded that a new, relatively non-political Tutsi should be appointed to the office, believing this type of person would make for a politically impotent prefect. Lando Ndasingwa, a minister in the new government and vice president of the Liberal Party (PL), suggested that the post be given to Habyalimana, a member of the PL. Habyalimana was viewed favorably by the government as a skilled academic who cared little for ethnic and regional differences and could collaborate with Hutus and northerners. The PSD agreed to the suggestion, as they already controlled other offices in Butare and found Habyalimana to be agreeable to them. He was appointed Prefect of Butare by presidential decree on 14 August 1992.

=== Tenure ===
During Habyalimana's two-year tenure as prefect, Butare experienced increasing political disorder as municipal officials were purged and murdered. Habyalimana was able to maintain security in the prefecture for most regular people and commerce, in contrast to the situation in Kigali. He also maintained good relations with many MRND politicians and had the respect of Major Cyriaque Habyarabatuma, the local commander of the gendarmerie. His informal style of leadership and relaxed attitude generated anger in some quarters, and he was politically isolated. His relations with the MRND Burgomaster of Maraba, Jean-Marie Habineza, were more strained, as Habineza faced numerous corruption allegations.

=== Actions during the Rwandan genocide ===
On 6 April 1994 President Habyarimana's plane was shot down by unknown assailants over Kigali, killing all aboard. The military subsequently installed a new interim government of Hutu extremists on 9 April. Fearing for his safety, Habyalimana refused to attend the conference of prefects called by the new government in Kigali on 11 April. Two days later the Hutu propagandist broadcaster Radio Télévision Libre des Mille Collines (RTLM) declared that Tutsis were concealing themselves amongst displaced persons fleeing to Butare Prefecture. In response, Habyalimana ordered communal meetings to be held to urge calm. On 17 April Habyalimana and Major Habyarabatuma visited Cyahinda church in Nyakizu commune. Their arrival allowed for a brief pause in the killings, and Habyalimana pledged to a crowd of Tutsis that he would bring them food and troops to protect them. He also met with the Prefect of Gikongoro to urge him to stop the violence in his jurisdiction and thus prevent further people from fleeing to Butare. When he was returning to Butare town that night, Radio Rwanda announced Habyalimana's dismissal as prefect. The International Criminal Tribunal for Rwanda later ruled that this was done by the interim government since it concluded that Habyalimana would resist its desire to incite massacres of Tutsis. That day RTLM presenter Valérie Bemeriki accused him of working with the RPF. Habyalimana was present at the inauguration of the new prefect, Sylvain Nsabimana, on the morning of 19 April in Butare town, but fearing for his personal safety he soon went into hiding. In mid-May he was found by gendarmes and only agreed to accompany them when they guaranteed his safety. He was imprisoned in Butare and later taken to Gitarama under the pretext of meeting the interim government where he was probably executed. His wife and two daughters were murdered by the military in late June.
