= Tharcisse Renzaho =

Rwandan politician (born 1944)

- Born: 17 July 1944 (age 82); Kibungo, Rwanda-Urundi
- Occupations: Soldier, Politician
- Status: Incarcerated
- Allegiance: Rwanda
- Conviction: 2002 Genocide against the Tutsi
- Penalty: Life imprisonment (2009)

Tharcisse Renzaho (born 17 July 1944) is a Rwandan soldier, former politician and war criminal. He is best known for his role in the Genocide against the Tutsi.

Renzaho was born in the Gaseta sector of the Kigarama commune, in the Rwandan prefecture of Kibungo. He was educated as a military engineer in various academies in Germany, France and Belgium. After returning to Rwandan he rose to the rank of colonel in the Rwandan Armed Forces.

In 1990, he entered politics. An ethnic Hutu, he was a part of Juvénal Habyarimana's dominant MRND party. He became governor of the prefecture of Kigali-ville, and president of the Civil Defence Committee for Kigali.

According to the prosecutor for the International Criminal Tribunal for Rwanda (ICTR), Renzaho is alleged to have contributed to the genocide in numerous ways between 7 April and July 1994, including exercising his authority to set up roadblocks for the interception and murder of Tutsis, dismissing councillors who objected to the genocide, personally ordering the detainment and murder of Tutsis, equipping genocidaires with Kalashnikov rifles, and ordering the murder of the journalist André Kameya.

Following the collapse of the interim government and the victory of the RPF, Renzaho fled to Zaire.

He was arrested on 26 September 2002 in the Democratic Republic of Congo, and was turned over to the ICTR on 29 September.

On 14 July 2009 the ICTR sentenced Renzaho to life in prison. On 1 April 2011 the Appeals Chamber confirmed Renzaho's sentence.
