= Athanase Seromba =

Rwandan priest (born 1963)

- Born: 1963 (age 62–63)
- Occupation: Priest
- Status: Incarcerated
- Convictions: Genocide; Crimes against humanity
- Penalty: Life imprisonment

Athanase Seromba (born 1963) is a Catholic priest from Rwanda who was found guilty of committing genocide and of crimes against humanity during the Rwandan genocide.

== Crimes ==
At the time of the genocide, Seromba was the priest in charge of a Catholic parish at Nyange in the Kibuye province of western Rwanda. He was convicted of committing genocide due to his providing of key and necessary approval for the bulldozing of his church, where 1,500–2,000 Tutsi were taking refuge, with the intent to not only kill large numbers of people, but specifically to destroy the Tutsi as an ethnic group.

Seromba fled Rwanda in July 1994. Catholic monks helped him move to Italy, change his name and also helped him work as a priest for the Chiesa di San Martino a Montughi near the city of Florence using the alias Anastasio Sumba Bura. Under pressure from Carla Del Ponte, the chief UN war crimes prosecutor, Seromba surrendered himself to the International Criminal Tribunal for Rwanda (ICTR) on February 6, 2002. On February 8, 2002, he pleaded not guilty to the charges of genocide, complicity in genocide, conspiracy to commit genocide, and extermination as a crime against humanity. His trial began on September 20, 2004, before the Third Trial Chamber of the ICTR. On 13 December 2006, he was found guilty and sentenced to 15 years in prison.

Seromba appealed the verdict. On 12 March 2008, the Appeals Chamber of the International Criminal Tribunal for Rwanda (ICTR) decided his responsibility was greater than previously found, affirmed his conviction, and increased his punishment to life in prison.

On 27 June 2009, Seromba was transferred to Benin. He is serving his life sentence at Akpro-Missérété prison at Porto-Novo, Benin.

== See also ==
- Emmanuel Rukundo
- Wenceslas Munyeshyaka
- Grégoire Ndahimana
- Elizaphan Ntakirutimana
- Rwandan genocide
