= Jérôme Bicamumpaka =

Rwandan politician

Jerome Clement Bicamumpaka is a Rwandan politician. He is one of the 402 co-founders of the Rwandan political party MDR (Mouvement Démocratique Républicain), a democratic opposition party, created in Kigali on July 1, 1991. He was born on November 4, 1957, in Mukono (Rwaza), in Ruhondo commune, Ruhengeri prefecture.

An economist by training and consultant by profession, he joined the Interim Government of Rwanda on April 9, 1994, as Minister of Foreign Affairs and Cooperation. This government was in power for only three months, from April 9 to July 17, 1994.

Exiled in mid-July 1994, Bicamumpaka moved first to Kinshasa, Zaire, then to Yaoundé, Cameroon, where he tried to work as a consultant.

On April 6, 1999, he was arrested by the Prosecutor of the ICTR (International Criminal Tribunal for Rwanda) who accused him of crimes including genocide. Twelve and a half years later, he was acquitted of all charges by the Trial Chamber of the ICTR and released. Bicamumpaka was then taken into the care of the ICTR Registry in Arusha. Awaiting the opportunity to join his family in Canada, he has since resided in Tanzania.

== Birth, education and political affiliation ==
Jerome Bicamumpaka is the son of Balthazar Bicamumpaka and Basile Ntakazalimara. Born into a practicing Christian family, he was baptized while still a baby. His father, Balthazar Bicamumpaka, was an important figure in Rwandan politics from the 1950s to the 1960s; he worked for the abolition of the ubuhake (the old Rwandan social order, somewhat akin to feudalism), the advent of representative government, and Rwandan independence from Belgium. He is considered to be a founding father of the Republic of Rwanda, proclaimed in Gitarama on January 28, 1961, alongside, among others, Grégoire Kayibanda, Dominique Mbonyumutwa, Vénuste Kayuku, Joseph Habyarimana Gitera, and Jean-Baptiste Rwasibo. He served as a minister from 1960 to 1965, then as president of the National Assembly of Rwanda from 1965 to 1969. Following a political crisis in 1968, he retired from politics in September 1969 to engage in business. He died on May 13, 1981, and was buried in Rwaza.

Bicamumpaka completed his primary and secondary school education in Rwanda, but in 1977, he was obliged, for family reasons, to engage in business alongside his father. Seven years later, he resumed his studies by enrolling in the Faculty of Economics at the Université Libre de Bruxelles, in Belgium. He completed his education at the Institute of Administration and Management of the Université Catholique de Louvain (UCL School of Management) in 1989.

At the end of his studies, he returned to Rwanda and formed a management consulting company, with clients including private companies, non-governmental organizations, UN agencies, state projects, and government ministries.

Bicamumpaka entered politics by co-founding the MDR IN 1991. The party platform included the development of democracy in Rwanda, support for public freedoms, economic liberalization to strengthen the private sector, and aid for Rwandan refugees. The MDR quickly became the main political party of the Rwandan democratic opposition. The establishment of the MDR coincided with the Rwandan Civil War, and sought to provide opposition to the Rwandan Patriotic Front (RPF), once President Juvénal Habyarimana and his party, the MRND, had finally accepted the establishment of a multiparty system in Rwanda.

Bicamumpaka held several posts in the MDR. He quickly became a member of the party's secretariat committee in Ruhengeri prefecture, and a member of the committee in charge of studies and party programs. In 1992, he became chairman of this commission and at the same time a member of the party's Political Bureau, made up of 44 people from the eleven prefectures of Rwanda.

After the signing between the Government of Rwanda and the RPF, in Arusha, of the Protocol on the sharing of power and in view of the signing of the Arusha Peace Agreement which will take place on August 4, 1993, the MDR party is asked to designate the eleven deputies who will represent it in the Transitional National Assembly. In July 1993, Bicamumpaka was elected deputy of the MDR party, at the prefectural congress held in Ruhengeri. The National Transitional Assembly was to bring together representatives of approved Rwandan political parties, as well as those of the RPF. However, despite several attempts to set up the organs provided for in this Peace Agreement, none of them could be put in place before the fateful date of April 6, 1994.

In February 1994, when Prime Minister Faustin Twagiramungu was designated to lead the transitional government, he asked the MDR to nominate candidates for the three ministerial posts that were due to him. Bicamumpaka was one of the three MDR candidates submitted for the post of Minister of Foreign Affairs and Cooperation, even though he also held elected office.

== Minister of Foreign Affairs and Cooperation ==
On April 6, 1994, a plane carrying President Habyarimana was shot down while trying to land at Kanombe International Airport.

Following negotiations between the officials of the UNAMIR (United Nations Mission for assistance in Rwanda), the Rwandan military officials and those of the five political parties that had participated in the Government since April 16, 1992, a new Government was set up in place. It will be better known as the Rwandan Interim Government. The leaders of the MDR party proposed Jerome C. Bicamumpaka for the portfolio of the Ministry of Foreign Affairs and Cooperation, as the Political Bureau had done two months earlier. This is how he entered the government, in a chaotic environment of war, massacres of civilians and paralysis of all political and administrative organs of the Rwandan state.

The Rwandan Interim Government had received from the five political parties that made it up, a threefold mission, namely:

- To ensure the effective management of state affairs, with particular emphasis on the rapid restoration of order and the security of persons and property;
- To continue discussions with the RPF for the establishment of the institutions of the broad-based transition, within a period not exceeding six weeks; and finally,
- To tackle energetically the problem of food shortage by seeking ways and means to help the disaster-stricken populations of certain prefectures and those displaced by war.

The legitimacy of the Rwandan Interim Government could not be questioned as some people close to the RPF are still trying to do more than twenty-seven years after its establishment. In fact, not only did its establishment comply with the laws of Rwanda, as well as all the protocols signed between the Government of Rwanda and the RPF, during the Arusha negotiations, but also this legitimacy was recognized by the United Nations Office of Legal Affairs, on May 25, 1994, in New York.

Bicamumpaka was sworn in as Minister on April 9, 1994. The investiture ceremony took place at the Hôtel des Diplomates. As part of his ministerial responsibilities, he decides to meet urgently the ambassadors of different countries accredited to Rwanda. These are mainly those from the following countries: The Kingdom of Belgium, France, the United States of America, the Holy See and those responsible for UNAMIR. Having made contact with these ambassadors, their meeting is scheduled for the afternoon of April 9, 1994, at their respective residences. The objective pursued by Bicamumpaka for these meetings was to call on their respective governments to come to the aid of Rwanda and its people, by stopping the massacres of civilians, as well as the war, and by encouraging the immediate resumption of negotiations between the Government and the RPF, with the aim of finally putting in place the organs provided for by the Arusha Peace Agreement. To this end, Bicamumpaka proposed to the Belgian and French Governments, respectively, through their ambassadors, to use their respective forces present in Rwanda or in the region, to stop the massacres and protect civilians, starting with the city of Kigali. It was in this context that at the request of the Belgian Ambassador, Johan Swinnen, he intervened energetically in the Government, on the evening of April 9, 1994, so that a thousand Belgian commandos stationed in Kenya be authorized to land at Kanombe international airport, in particular for the evacuation of Belgian citizens resident in Rwanda. The first of these commandos were able to land the next day in the morning. There is no doubt that without his decisive and rapid action which enabled Belgian troops to deploy in Rwanda and to rescue Belgian citizens there, it would not be ten Belgians who could have been counted as dead in Rwanda, but several dozen civilians and soldiers! But after these soldiers finished rescuing the Belgians and evacuating them, their Government decided to withdraw them immediately. Of the four ambassadors Bicamumpaka wanted to meet on the afternoon of April 9, 1994, only Ambassador Rawson of the United States of America failed him, without any explanation. But to all these diplomats, the message from the Rwandan minister was the same, as the Ambassador Swinnen testified before the Trial Chamber of the ICTR in Bicamumpaka's trial.

From April 10, 1994, the latter wrote several diplomatic notes intended to inform the United Nations in particular (Security Council, General Secretariat, General Assembly, African Group, Group of Non-Aligned States, UNAMIR, etc.), the Organization of African Unity (OAU), countries which had bilateral relations with Rwanda, as well as several international organizations of which Rwanda was a member. The leaders of these organizations and countries have all received these Notes Verbales. Among the latter, we can cite the following:

- On April 10, 1994, a first Note Verbale was drafted and sent to all recipients, with the President of the UN Security Council first, with distribution to all its members.
- On April 11, 1994, a second Note Verbale was sent to UNAMIR officials in Kigali.
- On April 15, 1994, a third Note Verbale was also sent to all recipients, first with the President of the UN Security Council, with distribution to all its members.
- On April 20, 1994, a fourth Note Verbale[18] was sent to UNAMIR.

In his diplomatic notes, Bicamumpaka described the chaotic and catastrophic situation in which the Rwandan people were living, the massacres of civilians and the dramatic consequences of the war which had resumed in the leader of the RPF, and asked for immediate and urgent assistance to end them, as well as the creation of conditions for the establishment of the organs provided for in the Arusha Peace Agreement. Although it was difficult for him to be well informed of what was happening on the ground in Rwanda, given the chaos that reigned, he did not hesitate to speak about the fact that the Tutsis seemed to be the most targeted. by the killers, in the city of Kigali. He thus called for an intervention so that the killings of civilians were stopped before they spread to the rest of the country. He called on UNAMIR officials to deploy to Kigali to stop the massacres of civilians. During his meeting with General Roméo Dallaire at the Hôtel des diplomats on the afternoon of April 11, 1994, the latter promised to act, but it was only words! As we know all these calls for help from the Rwandan people apparently fell on plugged ears, and the Rwandan people paid a heavy price.

Almost all of the embassy staff were evacuated on April 12, 1994. Only the Chinese Embassy staff remained in Kigali. Moreover, for security reasons, the Rwandan Interim Government moved from Kigali to Gitarama that same day. Diplomatic work could therefore only be done outside the country. This is how Bicamumpaka travelled abroad, first to Burundi, whose president was killed in the attack on the Rwandan presidential plane. He then travelled to Kinshasa, Zaire, Europe, and the United Nations headquarters in New York. He also participated in the Organization of African Unity (OAU) Summit in Tunis.

During these trips, he met several political and diplomatic personalities, and the message addressed to them was the following: to call for the help of Rwandans who were perishing for unacceptable reasons, to do everything to help stop the massacres of civilians and the war, to come in humanitarian aid to the Rwandan people, to do everything to ensure that political dialogue is rapidly initiated between the warring parties in order to create the conditions for the implementation of the Arusha Peace Agreement signed on August 4, 1993, etc. .

During these meetings in New York, Paris, Bonn, Tunis, and elsewhere, Bicamumpaka observed that some of the major world powers had a bias on the Rwandan crisis and even wanted one of the parties to war have the upper hand and seize all the power. Which was the opposite of the spirit and the letter of the Arusha Peace Agreement, and did nothing to stop the massacres of civilians in Rwanda. These governments were only waiting for this seizure of power, and this is what took place in mid-July 1994. It was only then, and only then, that they mobilized massively to come to the aid of the Rwandan population, both those of the interior and those who had taken refuge in neighbouring countries. Obviously, the scale of the massacres of civilians and the distress of the Rwandan population in general were not sufficient to arouse the commitment of these countries to come to the aid of Rwanda.

== Exile and arrest ==
Bicamumpaka left Rwanda for good on July 17, 1994, for neighbouring Zaire. He lived in Kinshasa until December 1995, before settling permanently in Cameroon with his family.

On April 6, 1999, Cameroonian gendarmes accompanied by members of the ICTR's Office of the Prosecutor arrived at the offices of one of Bicamumpaka's clients, located not far from Yaoundé. While on an advisory mission to this industrial company, an ICTR agent came to his office and informed him that he was under arrest at the request of the ICTR Prosecutor, Louise Arbor. But, strangely enough, this agent does not carry either the arrest warrant or the indictment that would have been drawn up against Bicamumpaka. It was therefore an illegal arrest. Bicamumpaka was taken to the Cameroon Judicial Police headquarters in Yaoundé, where he will remain until his transfer to Arusha, at the ICTR headquarters, four months later.

== Legal proceedings and acquittal ==
The charges against Bicamumpaka were conspiracy to commit genocide, genocide, complicity in genocide, direct and public incitement to commit genocide, crimes against humanity (murder, extermination, rape), and the violation of article 3 common to the Geneva Conventions and Additional Protocol II.

During his first appearance before the Trial Chamber, Bicamumpaka refused to plead guilty or not guilty, because the registrar of the ICTR had refused his request to be represented by a lawyer of his own choosing. The trial opened on November 6, 2003, and the proceedings against the four defendants lasted almost five years.

The judges deliberated for three years before Bicamumpaka was acquitted on September 30, 2011. During the delivery of the judgment, the president of the seat declared that the prosecutor had accused Bicamumpaka and his three co-defendants of extremely serious crimes, but that the defendants had produced ample exculpatory evidence.

== Release and post-acquittal ==
After his acquittal, Bicamumpaka was immediately released. The prosecutor chose not to appeal the verdict..

The Registry of the ICTR immediately took charge of him for his stay in Arusha, while waiting to be able to join his family. The latter was staying in Canada and had in the meantime become Canadian. The administrative procedures with Immigration Canada will last several years, and today for almost four years, Jerome C. Bicamumpaka is still waiting for the Canadian Minister of Public Security to issue him a ministerial exemption allowing him access to Canadian territory and to be reunited with his family. By now he will have spent more than ten years in Arusha, awaiting this reunification.

On December 8, 2021, the Registrar of the Residual Mechanism (UN-IRMCT) who took over from the ICTR in this charge of his management informed him that he would no longer benefit from the protection of the United Nations and his care, in Tanzania, because he would have declined the offer made to him to be relocated to Niger! In fact, on November 18, 2021, the Registrar told him that he had to travel to Niger within two weeks for his final relocation, along with eight other people awaiting a host country. He then declined this offer, imposed unilaterally and brutally, because it was contrary to the UN-IRMCT Headquarters Agreement, in particular in its article 39(1), then for medical reasons, in view of the precariousness of medical care in Niger! Indeed, by doing so, the Registrar had violated his rights. On December 16, 2021, Jerome C. Bicamumpaka then had to initiate legal proceedings before the President of the UN-IRMCT, in order to be restored to his rights. This was done on December 20, 2021, following a decision by the President of the UN-IRMCT. The final judicial decision on the merits is expected in the coming weeks. Today Jerome C. Bicamumpaka still resides in Arusha, under United Nations protection, waiting to be reunited with his family.
