= Innocent Sagahutu =

Rwandan military officer

- Born: May 30, 1962 (age 64); Gisuma, Cyangugu, Rwanda-Burundi
- Status: Released in May 2014
- Convictions: Genocide; Crimes against humanity War crimes
- Penalty: 20 years imprisonment; commuted to 15 years imprisonment
- Military career
- Allegiance: Rwanda
- Branch: Rwandan Armed Forces (FAR)
- Rank: Captain
- Unit: FAR

Innocent Sagahutu (born 30 May 1962) is a former Rwandan soldier, who is chiefly known for his role in the Rwandan genocide.

== Background and role in genocide ==
Sagahutu was born in Cyangugu Province, Rwanda. Sagahutu entered the Rwandan Armed Forces, and by 1994 held the rank of captain. He was second-in-command of the Reconnaissance Battalion (RECCE) and commander of this battalion's A company, serving under battalion commander Major François-Xavier Nzuwonemeye.

According to the indictment, between 1990 and 1994, Sagahutu and other officers conspired to exterminate Tutsi civilians and political opponents, and helped to train interahamwe and militia groups who committed the genocide. They distributed weapons and prepared lists of people to be eliminated. After the death of President Juvénal Habyarimana in April 1994 and the start of the genocide, soldiers including those under Sagahutu's command assaulted and killed Prime Minister Agathe Uwilingiyimana and a number of important opposition leaders, and murdered ten Belgian soldiers who were guarding the Prime Minister.

== After the genocide ==
Sagahutu fled Rwanda after the RPF victory. He was arrested in the Danish town of Skjern in Ringkøbing County, on February 15, 2000. He had lived in Denmark for approximately two years as a refugee. At the time of his arrest, his neighbours described him as a "good family man" who lived a comfortable and quiet life with his wife and their two children, an eight-year-old-boy and a twelve-year-old daughter, who both spoke Danish and were enrolled in a local school. He was arrested while "he bicycled home from shopping for groceries in a nearby supermarket."

He was transferred to the authority of the ICTR on November 24, 2000, and his trial began on September 20, 2004.

In May 2011, Sagahutu and other ringleaders were convicted, and Sagahutu was sentenced to 20 years in prison. Sagahutu's sentence was reduced to 15 years on appeal, and he was granted an early release in may 2014.

Innocent Sagahutu was detained on March 10, 2017 in the Tanzanian district of Ngara while preparing to cross the border into Burundi. The former army officer told the Tanzanian newspaper The Citizen that he wanted to visit relatives living in Burundi. But according to the Tanzanian immigration services, he had no document authorizing him to leave Tanzania. Sagahutu told The Citizen that it was not true, saying that he had the proper documents released by the UN in Tanzania and that he had recently traveled to Mozambique and Switzerland with the same documents. However, a spokesman for (MICT), which has been carrying out residual functions of the ICTR since its closure in December 2015, denied this claim. Claiming that they did not provide him with any document authorizing him to leave Tanzania and that they had no authority to grant him such documents, Sagahutu was eventually released on May 1 of that year.
