= Prosper Mugiraneza =

Rwandan politician

Prosper Mugiraneza is a former minister of civil service in Rwanda. Mugiraneza was born in 1957 in Kigarama, Kibungo Province, Rwanda. He is a graduate of the National University of Rwanda in Butare, where he earned a law degree (Master of Laws LLM). Before becoming minister of civil service, Mugiraneza was a trial attorney in Byumba prefecture, a chief prosecutor in Gisenyi prefecture, a chief prosecutor in Kigali capital, Secretary General of the Ministry of Justice and minister of labour and social affairs. He is married and has four children. His wife and children currently reside in Europe.

He was tried for genocide and crimes against humanity by the International Criminal Tribunal for Rwanda, the trial beginning in 2003.

He was convicted and sentenced to 30 years imprisonment, but after a lengthy appeal, Mugiraneza was acquitted of all charges on 4 February 2013.

After his release from the UN detention facility in Arusha, United Republic of Tanzania, Prosper Mugiraneza earned a Master 2 in international and European law of fundamental rights through a distance learning program offered by the university of Nantes in France.
