= Incitement to genocide =

Crime against humanity under international law

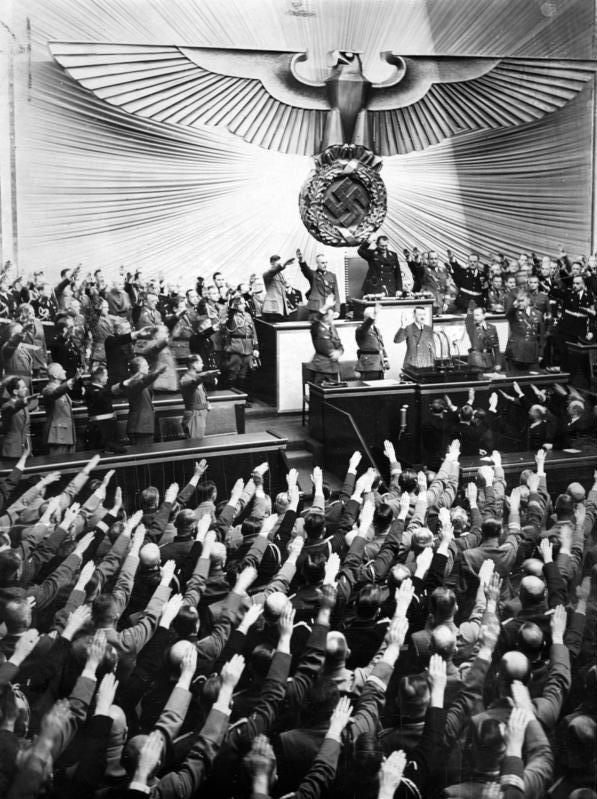
Audience members performing Nazi salutes during Adolf Hitler's speech of 30 January 1939, in which he threatened "the annihilation of the Jewish race in Europe!"

Incitement to genocide is a crime under international law which prohibits inciting (encouraging) the commission of genocide. An extreme form of hate speech, incitement to genocide is an inchoate offense and is theoretically subject to prosecution even if genocide does not occur, although charges have never been brought in an international court without mass violence having occurred. "Direct and public incitement to commit genocide" was forbidden by the Genocide Convention in 1948. Incitement to genocide is often cloaked in metaphor and euphemism and may take many forms beyond direct advocacy, including dehumanization and accusation in a mirror.

== Definitions ==
"Direct and public incitement to commit genocide" is forbidden by the Genocide Convention (1948), Article 3(c). If genocide were to be committed, then incitement could also be prosecuted as complicity in genocide, prohibited in Article 3(e), without the incitement necessarily being direct or public.

=== Incitement ===
Incitement means encouraging someone else to commit a crime, in this case genocide. The Genocide Convention is generally interpreted as requiring "specific intent to destroy, in whole or in part, a protected group".

=== "Direct" ===
"Direct" means that the speech must be both intended and understood as a call to take action against the targeted group, which may be difficult to prove for prosecutors due to cultural and individual differences. Wilson notes that "direct" does not inherently exclude euphemisms (see below), "if the prosecution can show that the overwhelming majority of listeners understood a euphemistic form of speech as a direct (rather than circuitous, oblique or veiled) call to commit genocide". American genocide scholar Gregory Gordon, noting that most incitement does not take the form of imperative command to kill the target group (see below), recommends that a "glossary of incitement techniques should be woven into judicial pronouncements".

The International Criminal Tribunal for Rwanda and International Criminal Tribunal for the former Yugoslavia came to different conclusions on the prosecution of incitement. According to ICTR, incitement did not require an explicit call for violence against the targeted group or causally connected subsequent violence. ICTY came to the opposite conclusion in Prosecutor v. Kordić, because "hate speech not directly calling for violence... did not rise to the same level of gravity" as crimes against humanity.

=== "Public" ===
Incitement is considered "public" "if it is communicated to a number of individuals in a public place or to members of a population at large by such means as the mass media". However, the Genocide Convention never defines the term "public" and it is unclear how the criterion would apply to new technologies, such as Internet-enabled social media. Jean-Bosco Barayagwiza was convicted by the International Criminal Tribunal for Rwanda for speeches made at a roadblock, but on appeal it was ruled that these speeches were not considered public.

=== Causation ===
Incitement to genocide is an inchoate crime as it is technically prosecutable even if genocide is never committed. However, Gordon writes that "no international court has ever brought an incitement prosecution in the absence of a subsequent genocide or other directly-related large-scale atrocity". Wilson noted that the judgement against Jean-Paul Akayesu "seemingly elevated causation to a legal requirement to prove incitement" as it stated "there must be proof of a possible causal link" between the alleged incitement and murders. Tribunals asserted that the incitement led to violence, even when this was not conclusively proven by the prosecution.

Davies details four benefits of an inchoate and separate approach to prosecuting incitement, instead of prosecuting incitement as part of the crime of genocide:

1. obviating the difficult task of proving a causal connection between incitement and violence,
2. allowing people to be charged with aiding and abetting incitement,
3. allowing incitement to genocide to be prosecuted even when the resulting violence cannot be proven to have been genocidal (e.g. rather than war crimes or crimes against humanity), and
4. enabling the prevention of genocide by prosecuting incitement thus acting as a deterrent to genocide.

=== Free speech issues ===
Defining incitement to genocide is important because it can be in tension with the protection of freedom of expression. In the Léon Mugesera case, a Canadian federal appeals court found that his 1992 speech claiming that Hutus were about to be "exterminated by inyenzi or cockroaches" was protected free speech and that the speech's themes were "elections, courage and love". Subsequently, the Canadian Supreme Court ruled that "reasonable grounds exist to believe that Mr. Mugesera committed a crime against humanity". Some dictators and authoritarian leaders have used overly broad interpretations of "incitement" or speech crimes in order to jail journalists and political opponents.

Gordon argued that the benefits of free speech do not apply in situations where mass violence is occurring because "the 'marketplace of ideas' has been likely shut down or is not functioning properly." Therefore, it is justified to restrict speech that would not ordinarily be punishable. Susan Benesch, a free speech advocate, concedes that free speech provisions are intended to protect private speech while most or all genocide is state-sponsored. Therefore, in her opinion, prosecution of incitement to genocide should take into account the authority of the speaker and whether they are likely to persuade the audience. Richard Ashby Wilson observed that those prosecuted for incitement to genocide and related international crimes "have gone beyond mere insult, libel and slander to incite others to commit mass atrocities. Moreover, their utterances usually occur in a context of an armed conflict, genocide and a widespread or systematic attack on a civilian population."

=== Alternate definitions ===
Alternate definitions and interpretations have been proposed by various authors. In Benesch's six-pronged "reasonably probable consequences" test, a finding of incitement to genocide would require violence as a possible consequence of the speech, which is compatible with existing jurisprudence. Carol Pauli's "Communications Research Framework" is intended to define situations where freedom of speech can be justifiably infringed by broadcast interference and other non-judicial measures to prevent genocide. Gordon has argued for "fixing the existing framework" by reinterpreting or changing incitement, direct, public, and causation elements. Gordon favors removing the requirement to be public, because "[p]rivate incitement can be just as lethal, if not more, than public."

== Types ==
Susan Benesch said "Inciters have used strikingly similar techniques before genocide, even in times and places as different as Nazi Germany in the 1930s and Rwanda in the 1990s." The following types have been classified by Gordon.

=== Direct advocacy ===
Gordon said that "direct calls for destruction are relatively rare". In May 1939, Nazi propagandist Julius Streicher wrote "A punitive expedition must come against the Jews in Russia. A punitive expedition which will provide the same fate for them that every murderer and criminal must expect. Death sentence and execution. The Jews in Russia must be killed. They must be exterminated root and branch." On 4 June 1994, Kantano Habimana broadcast from RTLM: "we will kill the Inkotanyi and exterminate them" based on their alleged ethnic characteristics: "Just look at his small nose and then break it". Gordon described Iranian president Mahmoud Ahmadinejad's 2005 comments that Israel "must be wiped off the map" as an example of direct advocacy.

Human rights lawyer Omer Shatz documented multiple examples of direct advocacy by Israeli leaders during the Gaza war. In particular, Shatz cited defence minister Yoav Gallant's exhortation to Israeli troops to "eliminate everything. If it doesn’t take one day, it will take a week, it will take weeks or even months, we will reach all places". Finance minister Bezalel Smotrich said during a speech: "We must not do the job halfway. Rafah, Deir al-Balah, Nuseirat, total extermination, erase the memory of the Amalek living under this sky."

=== Predictions ===
In the Rwandan Media Case, some broadcasts of the Radio Télévision Libre des Mille Collines (RTLM) that "foretold elimination of the inyenzi or cockroaches" were found to constitute incitement to genocide. An example is the following statement by Ananie Nkurunziza on RTLM on 5 June 1994: "I think we are fast approaching what I would call dawn ... dawn, because—for the young people who may not know— dawn is when the day breaks. Thus when day breaks, when that day comes, we will be heading for a brighter future, for the day when we will be able to say “There isn't a single Inyenzi left in the country.” The term Inyenzi will then be forever forgotten, and disappear for good." During the Bangladesh genocide, Ghulam Azam predicted that patriotic citizens of East Pakistan would "destroy" Indian infiltrators: a court found that this amounted to incitement.

=== Dehumanization ===
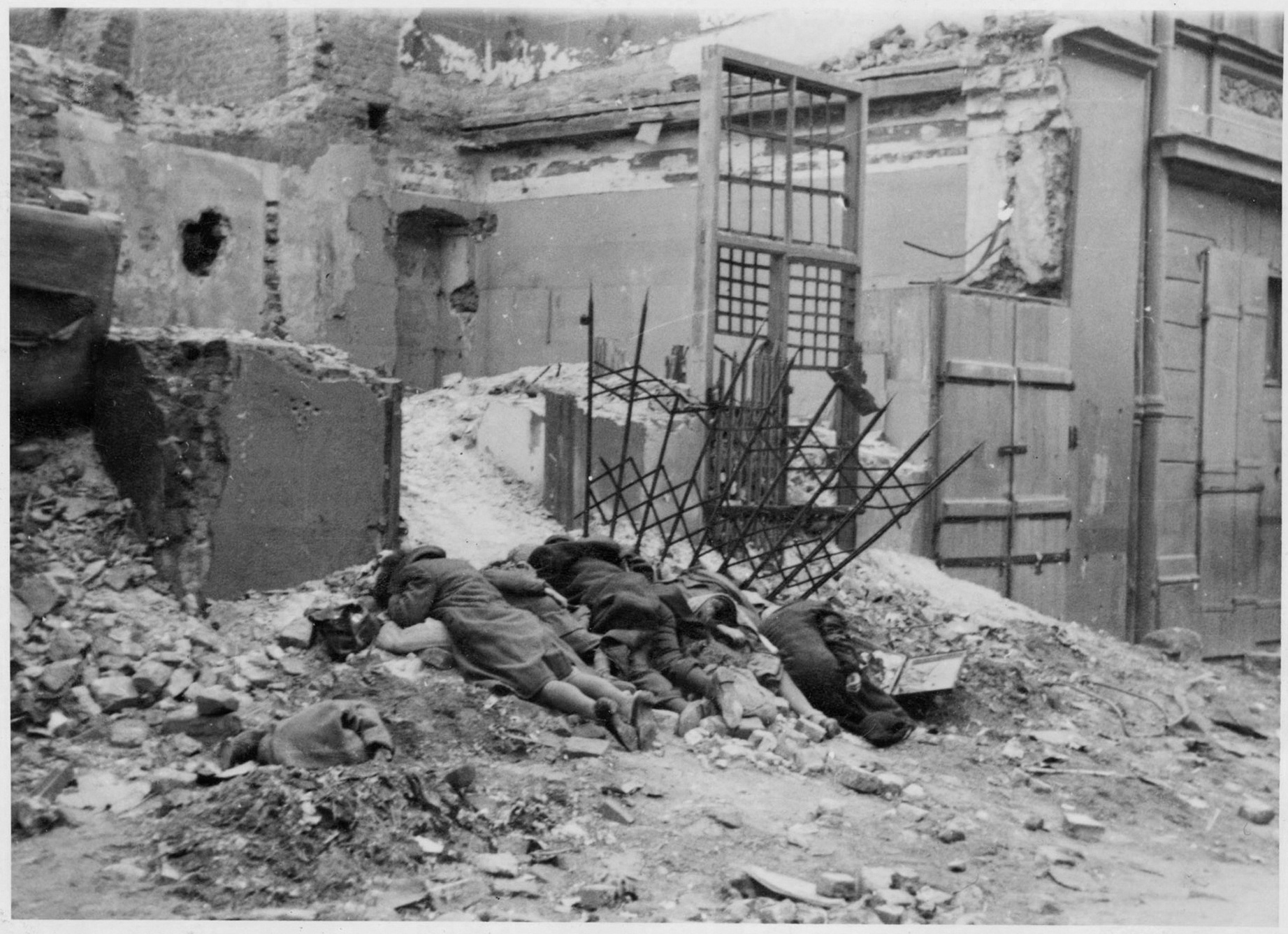
Jews killed during the Warsaw Ghetto Uprising, described in the Stroop Report as "bandits destroyed in battle"

According to Gordon, "verminization, pathologization, demonization, and other forms of dehumanization" can be considered incitement to genocide. Verminization classifies the target as something "whose extermination would be considered normal and desirable", which is why Hutu leaders frequently described Tutsis as inyenzi (cockroaches). RTLM propagandist Georges Ruggiu pled guilty to incitement to genocide, saying that calling Tutsis "inyenzi" meant designating them "persons to be killed". Gordon writes that like dehumanization, demonization is "sinister figurative speech but is more phantasmagorical and/ or anthropocentric in nature... [centering] on devils, malefactors, and other nefarious personages." Pathologization means designating the target as a disease. According to genocide scholar Gregory Stanton, this "expropriates pseudo-medical terminology to justify massacre [and it] dehumanizes the victims as sources of filth and disease, [propagating] the reversed social ethics of the perpetrators". Shatz describes dehumanization as "first and foremost a linguistic project, aimed at depriving people from their human qualities, personality, and dignity... humans are not deprived of their rights. They are robbed of their humanity." He adds that most genocides in history have been preceded by dehumanization. Stanton identified dehumanization as third in the eight stages of genocide, and said that "Dehumanization overcomes the normal human revulsion against murder." Stanton and others have contended that dehumanization is a necessary condition for genocide; Johannes Lang said that its role is overstated and that forms of humiliation and torture which occur during genocide occur precisely because the victims' humanity is recognized.

=== Accusation in a mirror ===
Accusation in a mirror is a false claim that accuses the target of something that the perpetrator is doing or intends to do. The name was used by an anonymous Rwandan propagandist in Note Relative à la Propagande d’Expansion et de Recrutement. Drawing on the ideas of Joseph Goebbels, he instructed colleagues to "impute to enemies exactly what they and their own party are planning to do". By invoking collective self-defense, propaganda is used to justify genocide, just as self-defense is a defense for individual homicide. Susan Benesch said that while dehumanization "makes genocide seem acceptable", accusation in a mirror makes it seem necessary.

The tactic is similar to a "false anticipatory tu quoque" (a logical fallacy which charges the opponent with hypocrisy). It does not rely on what misdeeds the enemy could plausibly be charged with, based on actual culpability or stereotypes, and does not involve any exaggeration, but instead is an exact mirror of the perpetrator's own intentions. The weakness of the strategy is that it reveals the perpetrator's intentions, perhaps before it can be carried out. This could enable intervention to prevent genocide, or alternatively aid in prosecuting incitement to genocide. Kenneth L. Marcus wrote that despite its weaknesses, the tactic is frequently used by genocide perpetrators (including Nazis, Serbs, and Hutus) because it is effective. He said that courts should consider a false accusation of genocide by an opposing group to satisfy the "direct" requirement, because it is an "almost invariable harbinger of genocide".

=== Euphemism and metaphor ===
Perpetrators often rely on euphemisms or metaphors to conceal their actions. During the Rwandan genocide, calls to "go to work" referred to the murder of Tutsis. In Prosecutor v. Nyiramasuhuko, et al. (2015), two defendants had asked others to "sweep the dirt outside". The Trial Chamber of the International Criminal Tribunal for Rwanda (ICTR) held that this was incitement to genocide, because listeners "understood the words ... 'sweeping dirt', to mean they needed to kill Tutsis". Similarly, in Nazi Germany euphemisms such as Final Solution, special treatment, and "resettlement to the East" were used to refer to mass murder. According to William Schabas, "The history of genocide shows that those who incite the crime speak in euphemisms."

=== Justification ===
Justifying ongoing atrocities may be considered incitement to genocide. For example, Nazi propagandists repeatedly emphasized to potential perpetrators that "massacres, torture, death marches, slavery, and other atrocities" were carried out in a "humane" way. According to W. Michael Reisman, "in many of the most hideous international crimes, many of the individuals who are directly responsible operate within a cultural universe that inverts our morality and elevates their actions to the highest form of group, tribe, or national defense".

=== Praising past violence ===
Praising the perpetrators of completed atrocities can be a form of incitement. RTLM announcer Georges Ruggiu thanked the "valiant combatants" supposedly fighting a "battle" against Tutsi civilians. Eliézer Niyitegeka, transport minister, thanked militias for their "good work".

=== Asking questions ===
In the Rwandan genocide, Simon Bikindi's loudspeaker broadcasts to militia asking "have you killed the Tutsis here?" were held to contribute to a finding of incitement to genocide.

=== Conditional advocacy ===
In January 1994, Hassan Ngeze wrote an article stating that if Tutsi militias attacked, there would be "none of them left in Rwanda, not even a single accomplice. All the Hutu are united". The ICTR found that this was incitement to genocide, even though it was conditional.

=== Target–sympathizer conflation ===
During genocide, members of the majority group who help or sympathize with the targeted group are also persecuted. For example, during the Holocaust, non-Jews who hid Jews or simply opposed the genocide were murdered. In Rwanda, Hutus who opposed the genocide were labeled "traitors" and murdered. Mahmoud Ahmadinejad also threatened sympathizers with Israel, stating "Anybody who recognizes Israel will burn in the fire of the Islamic nation's fury".

== Causing genocide ==
According to Susan Benesch, the strongest evidence for a causal connection between incitement and genocide is found in cases where there is widespread civilian participation in killings (as in Rwanda or the Nazi Holocaust) and where the target group lives alongside a majority group, requiring the acquiescence of that group for genocide to occur. Frank Chalk and Kurt Jonassohn wrote that "in order to perform a genocide the perpetrator has always had to first organize a campaign that redefined the victim group as worthless, outside the web of mutual obligations, a threat to the people, immoral sinners, and/or subhuman."

Larry May argues that incitement to genocide is proof of genocidal intent, and that inciters (along with planners) are more responsible for the resulting genocide than mere participants in the killing. He believes that incitement should be prosecuted more harshly than non-leadership participation for this reason, and because "the crime in question is not merely the individual act of killing or harming, but rather the mass crime of intending to destroy a protected group."

== International treaties ==
Based on the precedent of Nazi propagandist Julius Streicher, who was convicted of crimes against humanity by the International Military Tribunal in 1946, "[d]irect and public incitement to commit genocide" was forbidden by the Genocide Convention (1948), Article 3. During the debate on the convention, the Soviet delegate argued that "[i]t was impossible that hundreds of thousands of people should commit so many crimes unless they had been incited to do so" and that inciters, "the ones really responsible for the atrocities committed", ought to face justice. Several delegates supported a provision that would criminalize hate propaganda even if it did not directly call for violence. The Secretariat Draft called for the criminalization of "[a]ll forms of public propaganda tending by their systematic and hateful character to provoke genocide, or tending to make it appear as a necessary, legitimate or excusable act". However, the United States was reluctant to criminalize genocide incitement due to concerns over freedom of the press, and opposed any provisions that were seen as overly broad and likely to infringe on freedom of speech.

The International Convention on the Elimination of All Forms of Racial Discrimination (1965) prohibits "all dissemination of ideas based on racial superiority or hatred, incitement to racial discrimination, as well as all acts of violence or incitement to such acts against any race or group of persons of another colour or ethnic origin". One of the most widely ratified treaties, International Covenant on Civil and Political Rights (1966) also prohibits "propaganda for war" and "advocacy of national, racial or religious hatred that constitutes incitement to discrimination, hostility or violence" (which arguably conflicts with a separate article calling for freedom of speech). However, according to Wilson, many countries signed these treaties to maintain a façade of respect for human rights while violating their provisions and there is little effective international enforcement of human rights outside of the European Court of Human Rights. No more trials for incitement to genocide were held until nearly fifty years after the ratification of the Genocide Convention.

Since 1998, incitement to genocide is also forbidden by Article 25(3)(e) of the Rome Statute of the International Criminal Court. According to the Rome Statute, incitement is not "a crime in its own right" and an inchoate offense, as it was considered in previous prosecutions, but simply one possible "mode of criminal participation in genocide". Thomas Davies contends that this change makes it less likely that a perpetrator will be held accountable for incitement.

== Case law ==
=== Nuremberg trials ===
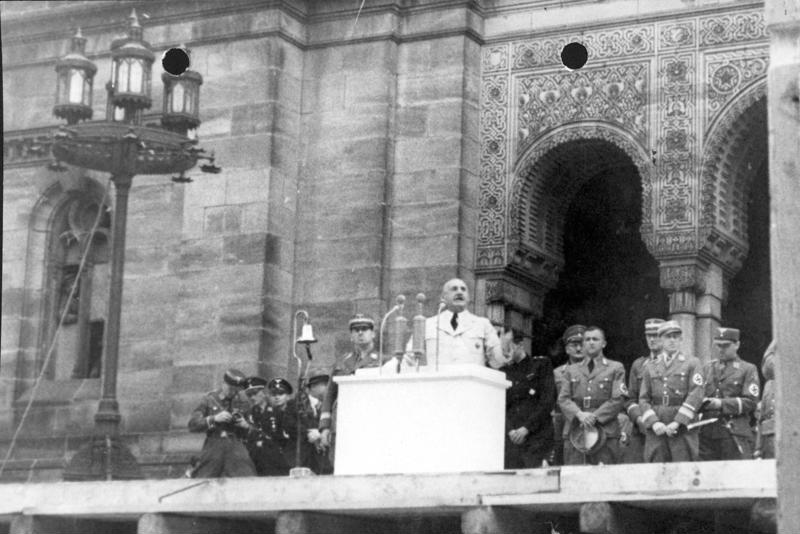
Streicher at the 1938 Nuremberg rally before the destruction of Hans-Sachs-Platz synagogue

Julius Streicher, the founder, editor, and publisher of Der Stürmer, was found responsible for antisemitic articles referring to Jews as "a parasite, an enemy, and an evil-doer, a disseminator of diseases" or "swarms of locusts which must be exterminated completely". He continued to publish antisemitic articles even after learning of the mass murder of Jews in the occupied Soviet Union. The prosecution argued that "Streicher helped to create, through his propaganda, the psychological basis necessary for carrying through a program of persecution which culminated in the murder of six million men, women, and children." Because Streicher's articles "incited the German people to active persecution" and "murder and extermination", he was convicted of crimes against humanity by the IMT in 1946.

Hans Fritzsche was the Chief of the German Press Division of Joseph Goebbels' Reich Ministry of Public Enlightenment and Propaganda from 1938; in this position he issued instructions to German newspapers telling them what to report. According to the IMT prosecution, he "incited and encouraged the commission of War Crimes by deliberately falsifying news to arouse in the German People those passions which led them to the commission of atrocities". Fritzsche was acquitted because the court was "not prepared to hold that [his broadcasts] were intended to incite the German people to commit atrocities on conquered peoples". Nuremberg prosecutor Alexander Hardy later said that evidence not available to the prosecution at the time proved Fritzsche not only knew of the extermination of European Jews but also "played an important part in bringing [Nazi crimes] about", and would have resulted in his conviction. Fritzsche was later classified as Group I (Major Offenders) by a denazification court which gave him the maximum penalty, eight years' imprisonment.

Otto Dietrich was not tried at the main Nuremberg trial, but was convicted of crimes against humanity at the Ministries Trial, one of the subsequent Nuremberg trials. According to Hardy, Dietrich "more than anyone else, was responsible for presenting to the German people the justification for liquidating the Jews". Hardy noted that Dietrich not only controlled Der Stürmer but another 3,000 newspapers and 4,000 periodicals with a combined circulation over 30 million. The judgement against him noted that he conducted "a well thought-out, oft-repeated, persistent campaign to arouse the hatred of the German people against Jews" despite the lack of direct calls for violence made by him.

=== International Criminal Tribunal for Rwanda ===
The ICTR indicted three people for incitement to genocide in the so-called Rwanda Media Case: Hassan Ngeze, Ferdinand Nahimana, and Jean-Bosco Barayagwiza. All were convicted. The judges asserted that "The power of the media to create and destroy fundamental human values comes with great responsibility. Those who control such media are accountable for its consequences". They noted that "Without a firearm, machete or any physical weapon, you caused the deaths of thousands of innocent civilians". Prosecutors were able to prove that "direct" calls to genocide were made despite the use of euphemisms such as "go to work" for murdering Tutsi. After an appeal, the conviction of Barayagwiza was vacated because he had not been in control of the media while the genocide was occurring. However, Barayagwiza was still guilty of "instigating the perpetration of acts of genocide" and crimes against humanity.

=== International Criminal Tribunal for the former Yugoslavia ===
The ICTY focused on prosecuting crimes other than genocide, because it believed that the hate speech that occurred during the Bosnian genocide did not meet the legal standard of incitement to genocide. Serb politician Vojislav Šešelj was indicted for crimes against humanity, including "war propaganda and incitement of hatred towards non-Serb people". Serbian politician Radovan Karadžić was convicted of "participating in a joint criminal enterprise to commit crimes against humanity on the basis of his public speeches and broadcasts". Dario Kordić and Radoslav Brđanin were also convicted of crimes based on instigating violence in public speeches.

=== National case law ===
The Bangladeshi International Crimes Tribunal dealt with incitement in the trial of Ghulam Azam, who had served as leader of Jamaat-e-Islami during the Bangladesh Liberation War. He was charged with 28 counts of inciting genocide and crimes against humanity, including denouncing Hindus and Bengalis as enemies of Islam and calling for them to be "eradicated from the soil of East Pakistan". The Tribunal found that Azam "expressed hatred and communal feeling towards the Hindu community with intent to destroy or deport this religious group from the country", and that many of his statements "amounted to clear incitement to commit crimes against humanity and genocide". Azam was sentenced to 20 years' imprisonment.

In 2016, Léon Mugesera was convicted of incitement to genocide and inciting ethnic hatred by a Rwandan court based on his 1992 speech. Another Rwandan court convicted Beatrice Munyenyezi of incitement in 2024 for encouraging militia members to kill Tutsi.

== Countering incitement ==
Inclusion of incitement in the Genocide Convention was intended to prevent genocide. As the judgement of Prosecutor v. Kalimanzira stated, "The inchoate nature of the crime allows intervention at an earlier stage, with the goal of preventing the occurrence of genocidal acts." Irwin Cotler stated that efforts to enforce the Genocide Convention in inchoate incitement cases "have proven manifestly inadequate". Alternately, prosecution for incitement after the genocide had concluded could have deterrent effect on those planning to commit the crime, but the effectiveness of international criminal trials as a deterrent is disputed. However, deterrence is less effective when the definition of the crime is contested and undefined.

Besides prosecutions, non-judicial interventions (called "information intervention") is possible against incitement, such as jamming broadcasting frequencies used to disseminate incitement or broadcasting counterspeech advocating against genocide. Genocide-inciting social media accounts and websites (such as those used by Islamic State to spread propaganda) can be shut down and taken offline. However, propagandists can circumvent these methods by creating new accounts or moving to a different hosting service. As an alternative to outright censorship, Google developed a "Redirect Method" which identifies individuals searching for IS-related material and redirects them to content which challenges IS narratives.

== See also ==
- Incitement to ethnic or racial hatred
- Genocidal intent
- Genocide studies
- Rwandan genocide
- 1984 anti-Sikh riots

== Sources ==
- Badar, Mohamed Elewa (2016). "The Road to Genocide: The Propaganda Machine of the Self-declared Islamic State (IS)". International Criminal Law Review. 16 (3): 361–411. doi:10.1163/15718123-01603004.
- Benesch, Susan (2008). "Vile Crime or Inalienable Right: Defining Incitement to Genocide". Virginia Journal of International Law. 48 (3). SSRN 1121926.
- Blum, Rony; Stanton, Gregory H.; Sagi, Shira; Richter, Elihu D. (2008). "'Ethnic cleansing' bleaches the atrocities of genocide". European Journal of Public Health. 18 (2): 204–209. doi:10.1093/eurpub/ckm011. ISSN 1101-1262. PMID 17513346.
- Bytwerk, Randall L. (2005). "The Argument for Genocide in Nazi Propaganda". Quarterly Journal of Speech. 91 (1): 37–62. doi:10.1080/00335630500157516. S2CID 144116639.
- Cotler, Irwin (2009). "The Danger of a Nuclear, Genocidal and Rights-Violating Iran:The Responsibility to Prevent Petition" (PDF).
- Cheterian, Vicken (2019). "ISIS genocide against the Yazidis and mass violence in the Middle East". British Journal of Middle Eastern Studies. 48 (4): 629–641. doi:10.1080/13530194.2019.1683718. S2CID 210535352.
- Davies, Thomas E. (2009). "How the Rome Statute Weakens the International Prohibition on Incitement to Genocide" (PDF). Harvard Human Rights Journal. 22 (2): 245–270. Archived from the original (PDF) on 2020-02-06.
- Eltis, Karen (2008). "A constitutional "right" to deny and promote genocide? Preempting the usurpation of human rights discourse towards incitement from a Canadian perspective" (PDF). Cardozo Journal of Conflict Resolution. 9: 463–478. Archived from the original (PDF) on 2021-04-14.
- Haslam, Nick (2019). "The Many Roles of Dehumanization in Genocide". In Newman, Leonard S. (ed.). Confronting Humanity at Its Worst: Social Psychological Perspectives on Genocide. Oxford University Press. pp. 119–138. doi:10.1093/oso/9780190685942.003.0005. ISBN 978-0-19-068594-2.
- Herf, Jeffrey (2005). "The "Jewish War": Goebbels and the Antisemitic Campaigns of the Nazi Propaganda Ministry". Holocaust and Genocide Studies. 19 (1): 51–80. doi:10.1093/hgs/dci003.
- Goldhagen, Daniel Jonah (2009). Worse Than War: Genocide, Eliminationism, and the Ongoing Assault on Humanity. PublicAffairs. ISBN 978-0-7867-4656-9.
- Gordon, Gregory (2008). "From Incitement to Indictment - Prosecuting Iran's President for Advocating Israel's Destruction and Piecing Together Incitement Law's Emerging Analytical Framework". Journal of Criminal Law & Criminology. 98 (3). Northwestern University Pritzker School of Law: 853–920. ISSN 0091-4169. JSTOR 40042789.
- Gordon, Gregory S. (2014). "The Forgotten Nuremberg Hate Speech Case: Otto Dietrich and the Future of Persecution Law". Ohio State Law Journal. 75: 571–607. SSRN 2457641.
- Gordon, Gregory S. (2017). Atrocity Speech Law: Foundation, Fragmentation, Fruition. Oxford University Press. ISBN 978-0-19-061270-2.
- Marcus, Kenneth L. (2012). "Accusation in a Mirror". Loyola University Chicago Law Journal. 43 (2): 357–393. SSRN 2020327.
- May, Larry (2010). Genocide: A Normative Account. Cambridge University Press. ISBN 978-1-139-48426-8.
- Richter, Elihu D.; Markus, Dror Kris; Tait, Casey (2018). "Incitement, genocide, genocidal terror, and the upstream role of indoctrination: can epidemiologic models predict and prevent?". Public Health Reviews. 39 (1): 30. doi:10.1186/s40985-018-0106-7. PMC 6196410. PMID 30377548.
- Rubin, Barry; Schwanitz, Wolfgang G. (2014). Nazis, Islamists, and the Making of the Modern Middle East. Yale University Press. ISBN 978-0-300-19932-1.
- Schabas, William A. (2018). "Prevention of Crimes Against Humanity". Journal of International Criminal Justice. Oxford University Press: 1–24. doi:10.1093/jicj/mqy033.
- Shatz, Omer (6 December 2024). Communication to the Prosecutor of the International Criminal Court: Incitement to Genocide in Gaza (PDF) (Report). The Hague. ICC-01/18. Archived (PDF) from the original on 2025-10-20.
- Spoerl, Joseph S. (January 2020). "Parallels between Nazi and Islamist Anti-Semitism". Jewish Political Studies Review. 31 (1/2). Jerusalem Center for Public Affairs: 210–244. ISSN 0792-335X. JSTOR 26870795. Archived from the original on 9 June 2020.
- Timmermann, Wibke Kristin (2006). "Incitement in international criminal law" (PDF). International Review of the Red Cross. 88 (864). Cambridge University Press on behalf of the International Committee of the Red Cross: 823–852. doi:10.1017/S1816383107000793. S2CID 146648227.
- Timmermann, Wibke Kristin (2014). Incitement in International Law. Routledge. ISBN 978-1-317-66966-1.
- Wilson, Richard Ashby (2017). Incitement on Trial: Prosecuting International Speech Crimes. Cambridge University Press. ISBN 978-1-107-10310-8.
- Wistrich, Robert S. (2014). "Gaza, Hamas, and the Return of Antisemitism". Israel Journal of Foreign Affairs. 8 (3): 35–48. doi:10.1080/23739770.2014.11446601. S2CID 142072208.
