= International speech crimes =

Speech acts criminalised by international law

International speech crimes are acts of speech which are criminalized under international law. Incitement to genocide is one example, but the Nuremberg trials and the International Criminal Tribunal for the former Yugoslavia convicted some defendants of crimes against humanity based on speech acts. For example, Serb politician Vojislav Šešelj was indicted for crimes against humanity, including "war propaganda and incitement of hatred towards non-Serb people". Serbian politician Radovan Karadžić was convicted of "participating in a joint criminal enterprise to commit crimes against humanity on the basis of his public speeches and broadcasts". Dario Kordić and Radoslav Brđanin were also convicted of crimes based on instigating violence in public speeches.

== Sources ==
- Benesch, Susan (2008). "Vile Crime or Inalienable Right: Defining Incitement to Genocide". Virginia Journal of International Law. 48 (3). SSRN 1121926.
- Gordon, Gregory S. (2017). Atrocity Speech Law: Foundation, Fragmentation, Fruition. Oxford University Press. ISBN 978-0-19-061270-2.
- Wilson, Richard Ashby (2017). Incitement on Trial: Prosecuting International Speech Crimes. Cambridge University Press. ISBN 978-1-107-10310-8.

Wilson, Richard Ashby and Gillett, Matthew, "The Hartford Guidelines on Speech Crimes in International Criminal Law" (2020). Faculty Articles and Papers. 633. https://digitalcommons.lib.uconn.edu/law_papers/633
