= Kibilizi Genocide Memorial =

- The Kibilizi Genocide Memorial, August 2025
- Interactive map of Kibilizi Genocide Memorial
- Location: Kibilizi Sector, Gisagara District, Southern Province, Rwanda
- Coordinates: 2.649776°S 29.782481°E
- Type: Genocide memorial
- Dedicated to: 1994 genocide against the Tutsi

The Kibilizi Genocide Memorial (also spelled Kibirizi) is a memorial site for victims of the 1994 genocide against the Tutsi. It is located in Kibilizi Sector, Gisagara District, in the Southern Province of Rwanda.

In 1994, Kibilizi was part of the former Nyaruhengeri commune. Many Tutsi from this commune were killed at Kibilizi from 21 April 1994.

== History ==
The Kibilizi Genocide Memorial

In April 1994, many Tutsi of Nyaruhengeri commune gathered at the commune office. They had been ordered to go there by the mayor (bourgmestre), Charles Kabeza. They were killed from the night of 21 April 1994.

The killers tortured the Tutsi. Women and girls were raped before being killed. Some victims were thrown alive into pit latrines. Local councillors announced that security had returned. Tutsi who had been hiding came out, and they were killed. The killers also used dogs to hunt Tutsi hiding in the bushes.

Some Tutsi from the town of Butare were also taken to Nyange, in Kibilizi. The Interahamwe killed them there.

== Commemoration ==
The Kibilizi memorial is a place where people pay tribute to the victims of the genocide. Kwibuka commemoration ceremonies are held there every year.

The memorial

The memorial

== See also ==
- Rwandan genocide
- List of Rwandan genocide memorials
- Gisagara District
- Kabuye Genocide Memorial
- Cyarwa Genocide Memorial
