= Nkurunziza =

Nkurunziza is a Bantu surname which means "good news". It may refer to:

- Ananie Nkurunziza (fl.1950s), Rwandan radio presenter and animateur
- Denise Bucumi-Nkurunziza (born 1969), Burundian ordained minister; wife of Pierre Nkurunziza
- Emmanuel Nkurunziza (born ?), Rwandan cyclist
- Pierre Nkurunziza (1964–2020), Burundian president; husband of Denise Bucumi-Nkurunziza
