= Larry May =

Larry May is the name of:

- Larry May (footballer) (born 1958), English footballer
- Larry May (philosopher), American philosopher
