= Iamhere (social movement) =

International movement to counteract hate speech and misinformation on social media

iamhere international
- #jagärhär
- Nickname: #iamhere
- Formation: 2016
- Founder: sv:Mina Dennert
- Founded at: Sweden
- Services: Countering hate and misinformation
- Methods: Using counterspeech on social media
- Members: 150,000 (2021)
- Leader: Mina Dennert
- Website: iamhereinternational.com

#iamhere, also spelt #IAmHere, is a social movement that uses counter-speech to counter hate speech and misinformation on social media, mainly Facebook. It began as a Swedish Facebook group called #jagärhär, and the umbrella organisation for the movement is iamhere international (I Am Here International), is headquartered in Sweden. Each affiliate is named in the language of the country, such as #IchBinHier in Germany, and followed by the country name when in English, such as #iamhere India.

As of 2021 there are over 150,000 members of the affiliated groups, which span 19 countries across Europe, North America, Asia and Australasia. It is described in a July 2021 study published by Facebook as "the world’s largest, citizen-driven, anti-online-hate movement".

== History ==
#iamhere was started in May 2016 as a Swedish Facebook group, #jagärhär (meaning "I am here"), by Iranian-born journalist Mina Dennert. During one of their campaigns in 2018, relating to Swedish lawyer of the year Linnéa Claeson, the group managed to shift the tone of the conversation, and the daily Swedish newspaper Aftonbladet began moderating comments on its posts.

Dennert won the Anna Lindh Prize in 2017 "for supporting just and democratic ideals", and has been the recipient of other awards, but has also suffered much personal abuse, as well as death threats and bullets by mail.

In February 2021, the World Health Organization hosted a webinar featuring Francesca Ulivi, journalists, the board member of iamhere international and founder of the Italian group #iosonoqui, and Xavier Brandao, network development officer of I Am Here International and co-founder and president of the French group JeSuisLà. The discussion began by talking about the problems of the infodemic relating to the COVID-19 pandemic.

== How it works ==
The movement, which is self-described as a "civil courage movement", welcomes diverse views and strives to promote democracy and freedom of speech. It is a form of social activism that uses a softer approach than many online activists.

Members of the individual groups are invited to find articles on social media, and moderators scan news articles and their comment threads. Where dangerous speech, hate speech, or misinformation is posted, the item is posted in the group (known as an "action"). Members may choose to comment on them in a way that is respectful, but countering the hate or misinformation, followed by the hashtag, or may support other members' comments. Recent hate speech has included racism and Islamophobia, and popular targets include LGBTI people and issues, women, anything to do with climate change, in particular Greta Thunberg, and First Nations peoples. Members' comments are hashtagged so that other members of the group can easily find them. The movement's groups instigate an estimated 10,000 actions per year.

Members sometimes find themselves confronted by organised groups of internet trolls, or "troll armies". German research has shown that "coordinated right-wing extremist online hate campaigns" had tripled between December 2017 and mid-2019. #iamhere members serve to interrupt and disrupt hate speech, and also to help to protect victims of cyberbullying. #iamhere members have been doxxed and threatened. Counter-speaking as a group helps to make group members feel braver and well-supported, as individuals trying to do the work on their own, they often become targets themselves and may suffer emotionally. The groups encourage individuals to speak up, and participate in debate in a way that is constructive and factual, using their own individual perspectives; they are not told what to write. Members are encouraged not to engage with trolls, but rather to post alternative viewpoints using facts, logic and compassion. The target audience of the actions are primarily readers of the comments sections, not those who post misinformation and hate, including "vulnerable observers" who may be attracted to the hate speech.

== Organisation ==
As of 2021 the movement comprises more than 150,000 members over 16 groups, with the umbrella organisation, headquartered in Sweden and run by Dennert, known as #iamhere international or I Am Here International.

As of May 2021 there are groups in Sweden (the biggest group, with 72,300 members), Germany, Italy, France, Slovakia, Poland, the UK, Spain, Bulgaria, Czech Republic, Finland, Norway, India, Canada, the US and Australia. There are Swiss members in the Italian and French groups, and Belgian members in the French group, while the UK group also covers Ireland. Each affiliate is named in the language of the country, such as #IchBinHier in Germany, and jesuislà in France, and followed by the country name when in English, such as #iamhere India.

- iamhere Canada was founded by Alena Helgeson.
- The German group, #IchBinHier, was formed by marketing consultant Hannes Ley, and as of 2019 had 45,000 members.

== Collaborations ==
In February 2020 the Stop Funding Hate campaign joined I Am Here in a Valentine's Day action to combat hatred and extremism, inspired by the founder of the #ExtinguishHate campaign begun by the man who fought off a terrorist in the 2019 London Bridge stabbing.

== Commentary and analysis ==
In 2017 Deutsche Welle published an article about the German group, #ichbinhier. It commented that the group's success may be measured by the fact that "right-wing extremists themselves now complain on Facebook that the group is trying to deprive them of their right to free speech".

A 2017–8 study by the Dusseldorf Institute for Internet and Democracy looking at the German groups actions on 167 news articles over three months concluded that they "increased the average level of online discussion for rationality, constructiveness, civility and politeness".

In mid-2019 Fox News ran a piece on the group's activities on Facebook, comparing its effectiveness in combating hate speech on the platform with Facebook's own mechanisms for doing so.

A 2019 article in the BBC's "Trending" series asks if Facebook, which does provide the volunteer groups with some practical support, should be doing more itself to counteract hate speech and provide better moderation on its platform.

In a 2019 report on the worldwide rise of the violent white supremacist movement published by independent thinktank on global security The Soufan Center, I Am Here is given as an example of useful counter-speech in the online space, where it performs an important function in helping to keep a check on extremist rhetoric and inaccurate dogma by providing facts and alternative viewpoints.

In 2020 anthropologist Cathy Buerger, Director of Research at the Dangerous Speech Project, an organisation based in Washington, DC] that focuses on the relationship between speech and violence, published the first known quantitative study of efforts to counter online hate speech, and called #jagärhär "the best-organized collective effort to respond directly to hatred online". Observations by Swedish members concluded that although the numbers of hateful comments may not have decreased, the increase in the number of counterspeakers has changed the proportions, so that others who are reading a comment thread are less likely to conclude that the hateful comments express the prevailing view. While there were some reservations among members about ongoing use of the tag, including getting accused of being members of some kind of sect, or censors, they spoke of the positive aspects of the model, in particular that it can help prevent burnout, which can be the reason for the failure of many social change initiatives.

A research paper published in New Media & Society in March 2021 looked at "how netroots organizations strategically act upon digital resource abundance and particularly focuses on how resources are mobilized and managed and how netroots organizations create organizational structures on social media". Using three Swedish netroots organisations operating on social media, Not racist but, #Iamhere and #wecannotstandit as empirical cases, the study looks at the strategies used by these groups. It examines how online resources are mobilised and how each group manages its organisational structure. The authors suggest that the organisations have to act "like a Phoenix, the Greek mythological bird, as they constantly need to ‘reinvent’ themselves by being present and active on social media in order to maintain their digital resource abundance".

In an April 2021 paper published by the Institute for Governance and Policy Studies at Victoria University of Wellington/Te Herenga Waka in New Zealand, David Bromell discusses counter-speech and online civic interventions. Referring to "online civic intervention", or OCI, (defined by other scholars as "action taken by ordinary users to fight disruptive online behavior with the aim of restoring civil and rational public discourse"), Bromell gives I Am Here as an example of a group using "high-threshold OCI", where the subjects actively engage with those who post hate speech.

A June 2021 European Union study "to assess the impact of foreign disinformation targeting ethnic, racial and cultural minorities in the EU" lists I Am Here as one of seven successful initiatives as an action against disinformation, along with the "Get the Trolls Out!" campaign led by the Media Diversity Institute and Stop Funding Fake News, among others.

In July 2021 Facebook published a collection of articles under its "Courage Against Hate" initiative, which includes I Am Here International as one of six case studies of organisations which combat hate speech and extremism using counter-speech and other methods. The case study describes the movement as "the world’s largest, citizen-driven, anti-online-hate movement..." and concludes that the "#iamhere methods have been shown to be efficient and effective... [they] reduce the collective and personal burden of hatred and open new spaces for participants in social media where they can express themselves, expanding freedom and diversity of speech". However it is not enough on its own; there needs to be a broad and collective ownership among a variety of actors.

An as yet (as of July 2021) unpublished study by the Dangerous Speech Project looks at the psychological effect of engaging in counter-speech as part of a group, and reports a "contagion effect" which boosts the courage of individual members of the group and keeps them engaged.

A 2022 study by Marike Bormann of the University of Düsseldorf looked at a "differentiated typology of perceived incivility", which included the perceptions of #iamhere participants, as identified in a 2020 study by Ziegele et al.

== Awards ==
Mina Dennert won the Anna Lindh Prize in 2017 "for supporting just and democratic ideals", and #jagärhär won "Integration of the Year" at the Faktum gala, among other Swedish awards.

The German group, #ichbienhier, has won two awards: the Grimme Online Award in 2017, and a Deutschen Engagementpreis (category Demokratie stärken) in 2019.
