= Schwanitz =

Schwanitz is a German surname. Notable people with the surname include:

- Christina Schwanitz (born 1985), German shot putter
- Wolfgang Schwanitz (1930–2022), last head of the Stasi, the East German secret police
- Wolfgang G. Schwanitz (born 1955), German-American Middle East historian
