= Marilyn Friedman =

American philosopher (born 1945)

- Born: April 7, 1945 (age 81)
- Other name: Marilyn Ann Friedman

Education
- Education: Washington University in St. Louis; University of Western Ontario

Philosophical work
- Institutions: Denison University; University of Western Ontario; Bowling Green State University; Purdue University; Washington University in St. Louis; Vanderbilt University
- Main interests: Female terrorists, women's rights, and cultural diversity
- Notable works: Autonomy, Gender, Politics

Marilyn Ann Friedman (born April 7, 1945) is an American philosopher. She holds the W. Alton Jones Chair of Philosophy at Vanderbilt University.

== Education ==
In 1967, she received an A.B. in political science from Washington University in St. Louis. In 1968, she moved to Canada for political reasons and resided there for a decade. By 1974 she received a Ph.D. in philosophy from the University of Western Ontario in London, Ontario, Canada. In 1964, while Friedman was taking a year off from college, she was persuaded by what she refers to as "a kind of political ignorance and apathy" by political chaos.

== Career ==
Friedman's full-time teaching career began in 1973 at Denison University, where she spent four years teaching . Since then she has also taught in the U.S. and Canada, ranging from small private liberal arts college to a large state university, such as University of Western Ontario, Bowling Green State University, Purdue University, and Washington University in St. Louis.

By the mid-1980s, autonomy had become her main academic focus. "Many feminists thought that the moral ideal of autonomy represented male but not female modes of moral reasoning," said Friedman. "Most people saw autonomy as a separation of self from loved ones—a kind of selfishness. I see it in terms of self-determination, and I didn't think it had to carry specifically masculine associations." Friedman considers the impact of familial and community relationships on autonomy and considers critical reflection as a way to diminish oppression. She has also explored such topics as: the nature of close interpersonal relationships, women in poverty, care and justice, partiality and impartiality, autonomy, gender identity, and multicultural education. Friedman gained tenure in 1993, twenty years after she first began teaching. In 2009 she joined the faculty at Vanderbilt University, working in social and political philosophy, ethics, and feminist theory.

== Publications ==
Friedman's first book, What Are Friends For? Feminist Perspectives on Personal Relationships on Moral Theory, discusses friendship, care ethics, partiality, and impartiality. Her 2003 book Autonomy, Gender, Politics, defends the ideals of autonomy against various analyses and applies that model to issues like domestic violence and multicultural political relationships. Friedman is also the editor of Women and Citizenship, which contains essays by leading feminist scholars, and has co-edited Feminism and Community, Mind and Morals: Essays on Ethics and Cognitive Science, and Rights and Reason: Essays in Honor of Carl Wellman. Her articles have appeared in anthologies, as well as the Journal of Philosophy, Ethics, Hypatia, and others.

== Awards and recognition ==
Throughout Friedman's career, she has earned several research fellowships and directed a woman's studies program. Her fields of special interest are female terrorists, women's rights, and cultural diversity. Friedman's interests include a project on female terrorists, and she has covered topics such as whether virtue is required for happiness, how to engage in blaming people in a responsible manner, and how to understand abused women who are convicted of failing to protect their children from the same abusers who are abusing them.

== Personal life ==
Friedman was raised in the city of Chicago by parents who were poorly educated, working class Jewish immigrants. She is married to philosopher Larry May, and has one daughter.
