= Johann Soufi =

French-Algerian lawyer

- Born: July 10, 1982 (age 43); Chartres, France
- Education: CY Cergy Paris Université, Paris-Saclay University
- Occupation: International lawyer
- Known for: International criminal law, human rights advocacy

Johann Lounès Soufi (born 10 July 1982) is a French-Algerian international lawyer specializing in international criminal law. He took part in various international tribunals and United Nations investigative bodies, working on cases related to war crimes, crimes against humanity, genocide and other international human rights violations.

== Early life and education ==
Johann Soufi was born in Chartres, France, to a French mother, Marie-Claude Leborgne, and an Algerian Kabyle father, Cherif Soufi. He grew up in the Paris suburbs, in Val-d'Oise. He holds both French and Algerian citizenship.

Soufi completed his legal studies at Cergy-Pontoise University (now CY Cergy Paris Université) and earned a master's degree from Université Paris-Sud (now Paris-Saclay). He also passed the bar exam and attended the Bar School of Versailles. He is pursuing a PhD at Université Paris II Panthéon-Assas and Laval University in Quebec, Canada.

== Legal career ==
Soufi initially worked as a criminal defense lawyer in France before transitioning to international criminal law. He was admitted to practice before several international courts, including the International Criminal Court.

In 2007, Soufi joined the defense team representing former Rwandan official Callixte Kalimanzira at the International Criminal Tribunal for Rwanda (ICTR) in Arusha, Tanzania. Kalimanzira was convicted of genocide in 2009. Later in 2009, Soufi was recruited by ICTR President Khalida Rashid Khan to provide legal advice and assist in drafting the trial judgment of the Rwandan interim government during the genocide.

In 2011, Soufi was recruited by the Special Court for Sierra Leone to coordinate the drafting of the judgment against former Liberian President Charles Taylor.

In 2012, Soufi worked as a Coordination Officer for the United Nations Serious Crimes Investigations Team in Timor-Leste, overseeing the final stages of investigations into crimes against humanity committed during East Timor's independence process.

From 2012 to 2018, Soufi served as the Head of the Legal Advisory Section of the Defence Office at the Special Tribunal for Lebanon. He worked in the in-absentia trial of individuals accused of assassinating former Lebanese Prime Minister Rafic Hariri.

In 2018, UN Secretary-General António Guterres appointed Soufi as the legal advisor to the International Commission of Inquiry for Mali. The commission investigated international crimes and human rights violations committed between 2012 and 2018, submitting its final report in June 2020.

From 2020 to 2022, Soufi was the Head of the Legal Office of the United Nations Relief and Works Agency for Palestine Refugees (UNRWA) in Gaza.

In March 2023, Soufi joined Global Rights Compliance as a senior international prosecutor. He assisted the Ukrainian government in implementing legal frameworks for prosecuting atrocity crimes committed during the Russian-Ukrainian War and provided training to Ukrainian investigators and prosecutors.

Since September 2024, Soufi led the UN OHCHR Sri Lanka Accountability Project (OSLAP), established under UN Human Rights Council Resolution 46/1.

== Public activity ==
In 2018, Soufi co-founded the Institute for Legal and Advocacy Training (IILAT), based in The Hague, serving as its Strategic Director. IILAT provides advocacy training and capacity-building support to legal and human rights practitioners.

He is also a co-founder and member of the Conseil Scientifique of the Association des Juristes pour le Respect du Droit International (JURDI), a legal organization promoting adherence to international law and human rights, particularly regarding the Israeli-Palestinian conflict.

Soufi was a vocal advocate on humanitarian and accountability issues, particularly regarding Gaza and the Israeli-Palestinian conflict. Following the October 2023 Hamas offensive and the Israeli counterattack, he frequently appeared in international media, including "Le Monde", to provide legal analysis on war crimes and international law violations.

In February 2024, he co-represented 21 Palestinian victims in a submission to the European Union, urging sanctions against Israeli officials, including Prime Minister Benjamin Netanyahu.
