= Linnéa Claeson =

Swedish human rights activist, former handball player (born 1992)

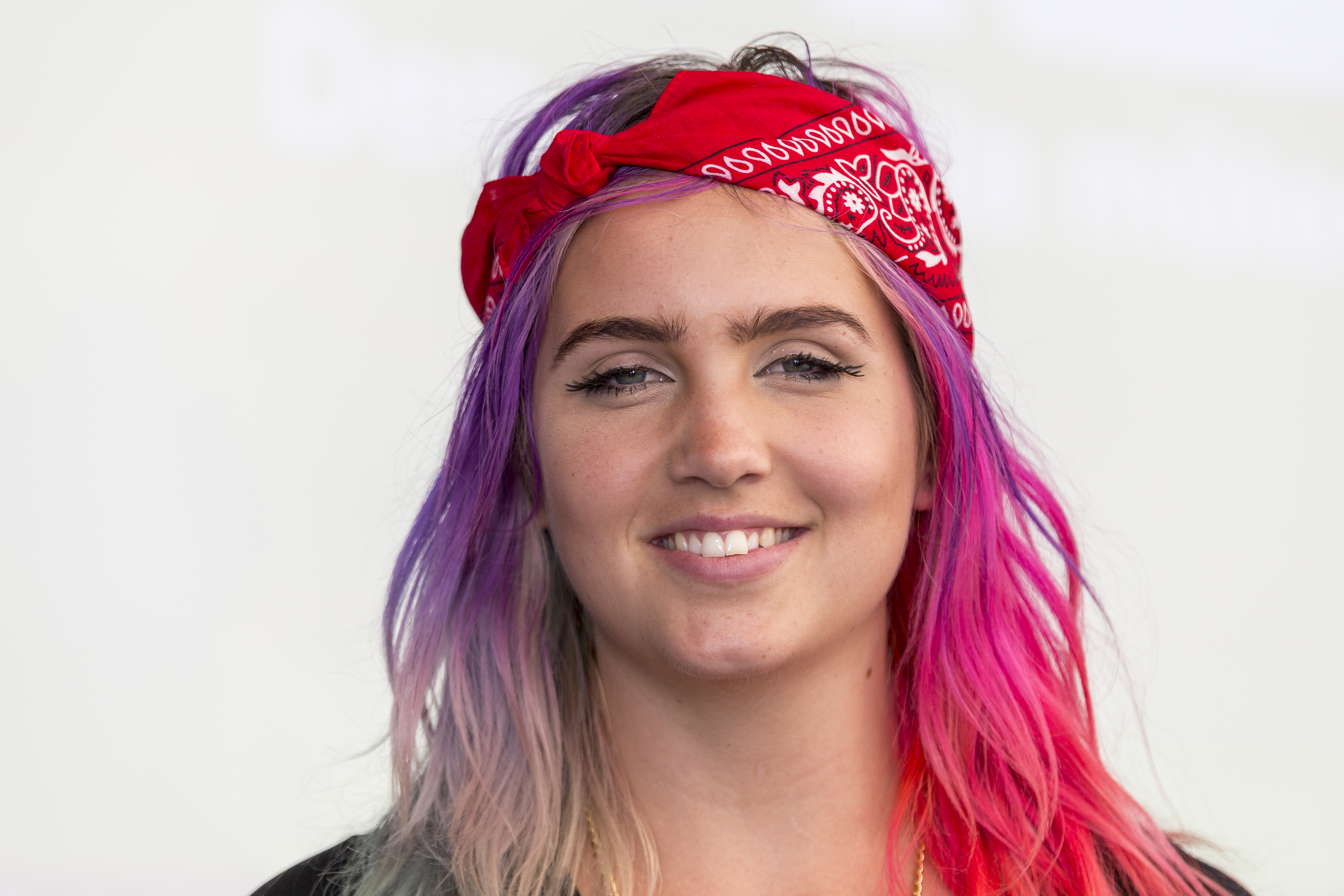

Personal information
- Nationality: Swedish
- Born: 31 January 1992 (age 34) Norrköping, Sweden
- Height: 1.79 m (5 ft 10 in)

Sport
- Sport: Handball
- Position: Right Back
- Current club: Ringkøbing Håndbold
- Number: 14

Senior clubs
- Years: Team
- -2009: IF Hellton
- 2009-2017: Skuru IK
- 2017-2018: Ringkøbing

Linnéa Petra Sofie Claeson (born 31 January 1992) is a human rights activist and law student, known for her feminism and trademark multi-coloured hair, which has earned her the nickname "rainbow warrior". She is also a former Swedish professional handball player, active from 2013 to 2017, who played for Ringkøbing Håndbold.

Claeson was born in Norrköping on 31 January 1992.

During and since her sporting career, she speaks and writes about gender equality, racism and LGBTQI rights. She has co-founded several humanitarian organisations, including Omtanke Stockholm, supporting homeless people, Kvinna till Kvinna, supporting women in war and conflict zones, and Refugee Relief.

She founded @assholesonline on Instagram, which had over 200,000 followers by early 2018, in order to counteract the vitriol that she had had directed towards her, even as a teenager. She posted some of the misogynistic messages she had received, and included her own witty responses to them. (Later on some of them were revealed to be falsely fabricated and staged, thus was she accused of exploiting true victims of sexual abuse.) This earned her the UN Association of Sweden's Human Rights Prize, and she was also voted "Lawyer of the Year" by readers of Dagens Juridik. The accolades brought another torrent of abuse directed at her on Facebook. The #jagärhär (#iamhere) Facebook group countered the abuse by posting congratulatory comments and praise for her courage in standing up to the abuse.

She participated as a celebrity dancer in Let's Dance 2019, which was broadcast on TV4.
