= Kabuye Genocide Memorial =

- The Kabuye Genocide Memorial, August 2025
- Interactive map of Kabuye Genocide Memorial
- Location: Kabuye, Ndora Sector, Gisagara District, Southern Province, Rwanda
- Coordinates: 2.594662°S 29.833564°E
- Type: Genocide memorial
- Dedicated to: 1994 genocide against the Tutsi

The Kabuye Genocide Memorial is a memorial site and burial ground for victims of the 1994 genocide against the Tutsi. It is located at Kabuye, in Ndora Sector, Gisagara District, in the Southern Province of Rwanda.

The memorial holds the remains of more than 50,000 victims. Most of them were moved there in 2018 from mass graves in the district.

== Location ==
View of the memorial, August 2025

The memorial is at Kabuye, in Ndora Sector, Gisagara District.

The site is part of the national network of genocide memorials in Rwanda. These sites are places of burial, remembrance and commemoration.

== History ==
In 1994, Ndora was part of the former Butare Prefecture. Reports by the National Commission for the Fight against Genocide describe the role of national and local authorities in the killings in this prefecture. Administrative officials, militias and security forces took part. According to KT Press, the temporary memorial at Kabuye stood where the interim president Théodore Sindikubwabo is said to have given an inflammatory speech during the genocide. Sindikubwabo was born in this area.

In February 2018, Gisagara District announced a plan to move more than 50,000 remains of genocide victims to a new memorial at Kabuye. The cost was estimated at 500 million Rwandan francs. The aim was to give the victims a more dignified burial. In June 2018, more than 43,000 victims were moved to the new memorial. They had been buried in several mass graves in Ndora Sector.

== Commemoration ==
The memorial hosts the annual commemoration ceremonies of the genocide, as required by Rwandan law. Public institutions also take part. For example, staff of the Rwanda Revenue Authority visited the memorial in 2024. They also gave money to buy cows for genocide survivors in Gisagara District.

== See also ==
- Rwandan genocide
- List of Rwandan genocide memorials
- Gisagara District
- Ndora
- Cyarwa Genocide Memorial
- Murambi Genocide Memorial Centre
