= Pauline Nyiramasuhuko =

Rwandan politician

- Born: 1 April 1946 (age 80); Butare, Ruanda-Urundi
- Occupation: Politician
- Political party: National Republican Movement for Democracy and Development
- Children: Arsene Shalom Ntahobari (son)
- Conviction: Crime against humanity
- Penalty: Life imprisonment reduced to 47 years on appeal

Details
- Date apprehended: 1997

Pauline Nyiramasuhuko (born 1 April 1946) is a Rwandan politician who was the Minister for Family Welfare and the Advancement of Women. She was convicted of having incited troops and militia to carry out rape during the Rwandan genocide of 1994. She was tried for genocide and incitement to rape as part of the "Butare Group" at the International Criminal Tribunal for Rwanda (ICTR) in Arusha, Tanzania. In June 2011, she was convicted of seven charges and sentenced to life imprisonment. Nyiramasuhuko is the first woman to be convicted of genocide by the ICTR, and the first woman to be convicted of genocidal rape.

== Early life and career ==
Pauline Nyiramasuhuko was born in the small farming community of Ndora, in the province of Butare, to a poor Hutu family. She attended high school at the Ecole sociale de Karubanda. There, she became friends with Agathe Habyarimana, the future wife of Juvénal Habyarimana, who became President of Rwanda in 1973.

Nyiramasuhuko trained and worked as a social worker. In 1968 she married Maurice Ntahobali, with whom she had four children. One of their children, Arsène Shalom Ntahobali, would later be sentenced by the ICTR for a role in the genocide. Nyiramasuhuko worked for the government's Ministry of Social Affairs, educating women about health and childcare. In 1986, she attended the National University of Rwanda to study law. She was Minister for Family Welfare and the Advancement of Women in Habyarimana's government from 1992.

== Background of attack ==
The Rwandan genocide started on 7 April 1994, immediately following Habyarimana's assassination. Armed Hutus were deployed throughout the countryside. They set up check points to cull fleeing Tutsis from the rest of the evacuating crowds. Hutus who refused to participate in the genocide were attacked. At night, the residents of Butare watched the firelight from the hills in the west, and could hear gunfire from nearby villages. When armed Hutus gathered at the edges of Butare, citizens of Butare defended its borders.

In response to the revolt, the interim government of Rwanda sent Pauline Nyiramasuhuko from Kigali, the capital, to intervene in her home town of Butare. She ordered the governor Jean-Baptiste Habyalimana to organize the killings. When he refused, he was killed, and Nyiramasuhuko called in militias from Kigali.

On 25 April 1994, thousands of Tutsis gathered at the stadium where the Red Cross was providing food and shelter. Nyiramasuhuko is said to have orchestrated a trap in the stadium. The Hutu paramilitary group Interahamwe, led by Arsène Shalom Ntahobali, Pauline's 24-year-old son, surrounded the stadium. Refugees were raped, tortured, killed, and their bodies were burned. Nyiramasuhuko allegedly told militiamen, "before you kill the women, you need to rape them". In another incident, she ordered her men to take cans of gasoline from her car and use them to burn a group of women to death, leaving a surviving rape victim as a witness.

She left Rwanda in 1994 following the Genocide and went to Zaire. She was arrested in 1997 in Nairobi, Kenya, along with her son, Arsène Shalom Ntahobali, the former Prime Minister Jean Kambanda, and eight others. Her son had been running a grocery store in Nairobi. Her daughter-in-law, Beatrice Munyenyezi, fraudulently obtained political asylum in the United States the following year. She was sentenced to ten years in the US in 2013 for her perjury related to the denial of her involvement in the genocide.

== Trial ==
Nyiramasuhuko was tried at the International Criminal Tribunal for Rwanda (ICTR) from 2001 to 2011. She was the first woman to be brought to trial by an international tribunal. She was indicted 9 August 1999, on the charges of conspiracy to commit genocide, genocide, complicity in genocide, direct and public incitement to commit genocide, crimes against humanity, and violations of Article 3 common to the Geneva Conventions and additional protocol 3. She pled not guilty to all charges. Nyiramasuhuko stood trial before Trial Chamber II with five others as part of the "Butare Trial" which, at its start in 2001, included the highest number of defendants to be tried jointly in relation to the Rwandan Genocide. Her son, Arsène Shalom Ntahobali, was one of the co-defendants and was accused of having led Interahamwe forces. Closing arguments for the Butare case were heard 1 May 2009. According to prosecutor Holo Makwaia, Nyiramasuhuko had intended to "destroy in whole or in part the Tutsi ethnic group in Butare".

On 24 June 2011, Nyiramasuhuko was found guilty of seven charges including genocide and incitement to rape; she was sentenced to life imprisonment and will not be eligible to apply for parole for 25 years. She was acquitted of three further charges. Although other women have been convicted of genocide by Rwandan courts, Nyiramasuhuko is the first woman to be convicted by the ICTR. Her son was also convicted and sentenced to life with no possibility of parole; four other officials on trial received 25-year sentences.

== See also ==
- List of people indicted in the International Criminal Tribunal for Rwanda

== Bibliography ==
- Sjoberg, Laura; Gentry, Caron E. (2007), Mothers, Monsters, Whores: Women's Violence in Global Politics, Zed Books, ISBN 978-1-84277-866-1
- Zimbardo, Philip G. (2008), The Lucifer Effect: Understanding How Good People Turn Evil, Random House Trade Paperbacks, ISBN 978-0-8129-7444-7
