= Ndora =

- Sector and village
- Location in Rwanda
- Coordinates: 2°36′12″S 29°50′1″E
- Country: Rwanda
- Province: Southern Province
- District: Gisagara District

Area
  - Sector and village: 61 km^{2} (24 sq mi)
- Elevation: 1,684 m (5,525 ft)

Population (2022 census)
  - Sector and village: 30,171
  - Density: 490/km^{2} (1,300/sq mi)
  - Urban: 3,542
- Time zone: UTC+2 (CAT)

Ndora is a village and commune/sector in Southern Province, south-western Rwanda, located roughly 10 kilometres east of the city of Butare. It is a farming community inhabited mainly by Hutu people. Pauline Nyiramasuhuko was born in Ndora in 1946. Callixte Kalimanzira, head of the Ministry of Interior and Communal Development, met in Ndora on June 7, 1994 and warned the people that the Rwandan Patriotic Front (RPF) were using small children who should also become targets. There is said to be an iron-smelting furnace in Ndora. A number of Hutu women in the village were widowed during the Rwandan genocide.
