= Beatrice Munyenyezi =

Rwandan génocidaire (born 1970)

Béatrice Munyenyezi
- Born: 1970 (age 55–56); Byumba, Mukarange
- Other name: The Commander
- Education: University of New Hampshire
- Known for: Involvement in the Rwandan genocide
- Spouse: Arsene Shalom Ntahobali
- Children: Three
- Relatives: Pauline Nyiramasuhuko (mother-in-law)
- Convictions: United States; Procuring citizenship unlawfully (2 counts); Rwanda; Murder; Genocide (complicity and incitement); Complicity in rape
- Penalty: United States; 10 years imprisonment Rwanda; Life imprisonment

Beatrice Munyenyezi (born 1970) is a Rwandan woman known for her involvement in the Rwandan genocide. She sought political asylum in the United States where she successfully applied citing persecution in her home country. Almost two decades later, in 2013, a US court prosecuted Beatrice for lying about her political affiliation during the Rwandan genocide. She was stripped of her American citizenship, imprisoned and eventually deported back to Rwanda, where she was given a life sentence.

== Life ==
Munyenyezi was born around 1970 in Butare, Southern Province, in Rwanda.

When she married, her husband's mother was Pauline Nyiramasuhuko, who was later a minister in the provisional government of Juvénal Habyarimana. The event that triggered the start of the Tutsi genocide was the assassination of the Rwandan president when his plane was shot down on 6 April 1994. Her mother and husband were involved in activities in Munyenyezi's home town. Her husband was a student at the National University of Rwanda in Butare. He was also a leader in the extremist Hutu organisation known as the Interahamwe, of which Munyenyezi was a member, for the area around the city.

Her husband and others were found guilty of killing refugees, orphans and patients from the local hospital and of taking Tutsi prisoners and arranging for them to be executed. In particular he and his mother organised and staffed a roadblock outside their family's hotel where Tutsi were identified, imprisoned and executed. Munyenyezi herself commanded the roadblock where she inspected the identity cards of those who wished to pass and singled out those who were Tutsi, whom she took aside to be killed. Female Tutsis who were identified were raped by the Interhamwe before they were killed. Munyenyezi, nicknamed "The Commander", was alleged to have personally committed acts of violence against the Tutsi, including beating a child to death with a club after being mocked by fellow Interhamwe members for never having killed a Tutsi.

In 1997 her husband and his mother were arrested in Nairobi where he had been running a grocery store for three years.

In 1998 she and her three daughters settled in Manchester, New Hampshire after she was given political asylum based on her testimony that she was being persecuted in her home country. While residing in America she gained an education at the University of New Hampshire and became an advocate for refugees, gaining notoriety by speaking about her supposed experiences as a genocide survivor. Munyenyezi later appeared as a defence witness for her husband and mother-in-law at the International Criminal Tribunal for Rwanda in 2006. They were both sentenced to life imprisonment despite Munyenyezi's evidence that they were not involved in the genocide. She said that she had not seen any killings at the infamous roadblock.

The US government began investigating Munyenyezi in 2007 following her testimony at the ICTR. She was arrested in 2010 and charged with illegally obtaining her American citizenship by lying about her role in the genocide. Her first trial in 2012 resulted in a mistrial, as jurors were reportedly confused by poor translations of evidence from Rwanda. At her second trial, Munyenyezi denied that she had lied and continued to claim that she did not take part in the genocide. However, witnesses at both trials accused her of atrocities, including ordering militia members to commit rape and rewarding them with food and beer. One survivor, Thierry Sebaganwa, stated that Munyenyezi had mocked him by telling him that his mother had just been murdered. Others recalled that Munyenyezi had ordered soldiers to rape a nun before personally shooting her. Munyenyezi was found guilty in February 2013 of lying to obtain her citizenship and received the maximum sentence of ten years, with an order that she would be deported after her sentence was complete.

In October 2019 an American judge turned down her request for a retrial noting that the reasons for a retrial were trivial. The judge said that the sentence would stand and she faced the prospect of being deported when her sentence was complete. Munyenyezi completed her sentence in 2021, and was subsequently deported to Rwanda.

=== 2021 arrest and conviction ===
Following her arrival in Rwanda on 16 April, Munyenyezi was handed over to local authorities to stand trial for crimes committed during the genocide. On 5 May 2021, she was indicted before a court in Kigali and pleaded not guilty.

Prosecutors accused Munyenyezi of murdering Tutsis, planning and inciting genocide, and being complicit in genocide and rape. The trial concluded in April 2024. Munyenyezi was found guilty on most counts, but was acquitted on the sole charge of helping to plan the genocide. On 12 April, Munyenyezi was sentenced to life imprisonment.
