= Speech crimes =

Criminalized form of communication

Speech crimes are certain kinds of speech that are criminalized by promulgated laws or rules. Criminal speech is a direct preemptive restriction on freedom of speech, and the broader concept of freedom of expression.

Laws vary by country in accordance with the legal principles that form the basis of their system of jurisprudence. Prohibitions on shouting fire in a crowded theater (as a practical joke, not as a warning) are not considered controversial in any country, given the potential for imminent harm.

== United States ==
=== Definition of criminal speech ===
Criminal speech is a legal concept that identifies certain kinds of speech as a crime and outside the protection of the First Amendment. In order for a statute that places limits on speech based on its content to be found constitutional, it must pass strict scrutiny analysis as set forth in United States v. O’Brien (1968).

=== Reasoning for free speech ===
In the United States the right to free speech is in the Bill of Rights. Words are expressions of ideas, and allow freedom of individuality. To Founding Father Thomas Jefferson, it was of the utmost importance to keep all speech free in order for the truth to emerge and to have a civil society. Jefferson adopted the Lockean ideas of “inalienable rights to life, liberty, and pursuit of property” but emphasized that “man must give up some of his freedom to secure civility in the government, and if the government violates its duties then man has the power to revolt through expression.″

Case law defines what constitutes criminal speech in the United States. The following are types of non-protected speech:

1. Threats – speech that “encompass(es) those statements where the speaker means to communicate a serious expression of an intent to commit an act of unlawful violence to a particular individual or group of individuals. The speaker need not actually intend to carry out the threat." This is similar to the concept that “true threats” are not protected under the First Amendment.
2. Incitement to Violence – set forth by the court in the case Brandenberg v. Ohio (1969). In this case, the Court found that the First Amendment did “not permit a State to forbid or proscribe advocacy ... except where such advocacy is directed to inciting or producing imminent lawless action and is likely to incite or produce such action." The speaker must have intended for incitement to result. This overruled the previously held "clear and present danger" test in Schenck v. United States (1919). The incitement to violence test is usually used when questioning the legal validity of hate speech.
3. Defamation – as set forth in New York Times v. Sullivan (1964), occurs when one publishes material, claiming its validity, that harms or maligns one’s character or reputation. An actual malice requirement must be proven for a public official to seek damages as a result of defamation. When defamation is in written word, it is called libel; when spoken, it is slander.
4. Obscenity – speech that meets the following criteria is considered obscene and can result in criminal sanctions if any of the following are true:

(a) 'the average person, applying contemporary community standards' would find that the work, taken as a whole appeals to the prurient interest;
(b) the work depicts or describes, in a patently offensive way, sexual conduct specifically defined by the applicable state law;
(c) the work, taken as a whole, lacks serious literary, artistic, political or scientific value.

== Germany ==
The relevant portions of the German Constitution that protect speech are Articles 1 and 5 of German Basic Law. Article 5 states, “(I) Everyone shall have the right freely to express and disseminate his opinion by speech, writing and pictures and freely to inform himself from generally accessible sources. Freedom of the press and freedom of reporting by means of broadcasts and films are guaranteed. There shall be no censorship. (II) These rights are limited by the provisions of the general laws, the provisions of law for the protection of youth, and by the right to inviolability of personal honor. (III) Art and science, research and teaching shall be free. Freedom of teaching shall not absolve one from loyalty to the Constitution.”

Speech can be limited as long as it is in a sense proportional to the right it is protecting - this emphasizes the Courts’ belief that “prioritizes personal liberty over government regulation.” The proportionality test is as follows: “…the Court must be satisfied by the following elements: (i) the means used by the government (i.e. regulation or prohibition) are suitable to further a legitimate objective of governmental action, (ii) there is no equally effective but less restrictive means available to serve the same public purpose, and (iii) there is an appropriate, defensible relationship between the importance of the public good to be achieved and the intrusion upon the otherwise protected right.”

=== Articles 130 and 131 ===
The German Criminal Code expands punishment from civil liability to criminal punishment and imprisonment if Articles 130 and 131 are violated. These articles ban hate speech ("Hassrede", legal term: Volksverhetzung).

Under Article 130, hate speech is criminalized if it could lead to incitement of violence, referring specifically to speech or writings that insult human dignity. Punishment is three months to five years imprisonment. This is the code that criminalizes Holocaust denial.

Article 131 extends punishment to those who disseminate, post publicly, or show to youth, renditions of senseless violence or violence that is deemed inhuman.

== France ==
The parts of the French Constitution that affect speech are Articles Five and Eleven of the Declaration of the Rights of Man and of the Citizen. "Article 5: Law can only prohibit such action as are hurtful to society. Nothing may be prevented which is not forbidden by law, and no one may be forced to do anything not provided for by law. Article 11: The free communication of thoughts and opinions is one of the most precious rights of man. Every citizen may, accordingly, speak, write and print with freedom, but shall be responsible for such abuses of this freedom as shall be defined by law."

Article 34 of the Constitution grants the Legislature the authority to determine conditions under which freedom of speech may be exercised.

- The Law of July allows the government to impose restrictions on hate speech by the press.
- R. 645-1 of the French Penal code outlaws the sale, exchange or display of Nazi related materials or Third Reich memorabilia.

== Criticism of monarchy and government ==
Countries vary on their treatment of freedom of expression. Some countries consider criticism of royalty and criticism of government as criminal speech.

In Thailand, under Article 112 of the Thai criminal code, anyone can file a complaint against anyone else who "allegedly defames, insults or threatens the king, the queen, the heir-apparent or the regent" and the police are obligated to investigate. Prosecution by the courts can result in jail sentences of three to 15 years.

In Cambodia, Jordan, Kuwait, and Bahrain, criticism of royalty and government are considered criminal speech, and are prosecutable (including prison sentencing) under the law.

== See also ==
- Limitations on freedom of speech
- United States free speech exceptions
- Contempt of court
- Defamation
- International speech crimes
- Laws against Holocaust denial
- Literary inquisition
