= Paperchase =

British multinational stationery company

- Type: Private
- Industry: Retail
- Founded: c. 1968
- Founders: Judith Cash; Eddie Pond
- Defunct: 2023 (as a retailer)
- Fate: Tesco bought the intellectual property, but not the stores
- Headquarters: London, England, UK
- Products: Stationery, greeting cards
- Revenue: £106,949,000 (2015)
- Website: paperchase.com

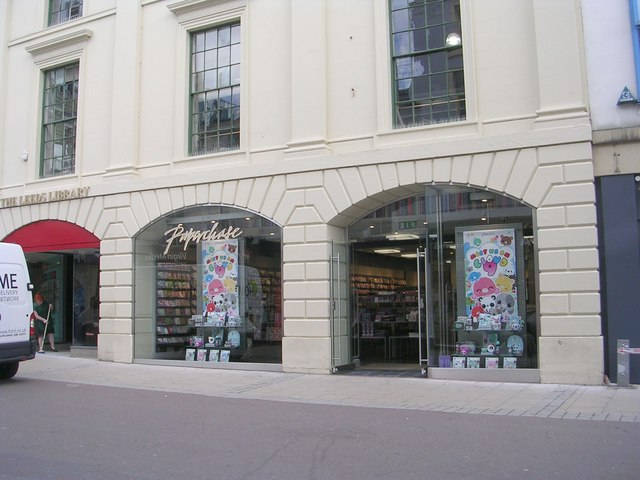
Paperchase store in 2010

Paperchase was an international chain of stationery stores that was originally established in the United Kingdom but later expanded into Continental Europe, the USA and the United Arab Emirates. As well as stand-alone stores, in the UK there were also concessions in selected Selfridges, House of Fraser and Next stores. The company went into administration on 30 January 2023, then Tesco purchased the brand and intellectual property, but not the stores and website, on 31 January 2023.

== History ==
Paperchase was founded by two art students, Judith Cash and Eddie Pond, around 1968. The company went through various owners before receiving investment from W H Smith in 1985. It continued to expand and in 1996 became Paperchase Products Ltd., having been bought by the existing management with investment from a venture capital fund.

In 2004, Borders Inc. bought out Graphite Capital, and the company grew internationally within the Borders network. In 2007, Borders sold a majority stake in the UK and Irish division of Borders book stores to Risk Capital for £10 million.

In May 2008, the Borders Group announced it was considering selling its 97% share to one of either HgCapital, Isis Equity Partners or Change Capital, with W H Smith interested in putting in a £50 million bid – 12 years after selling it at £1 million.

As a result, the Paperchase company lost a large presence on the British high street as there was a Paperchase concession within every UK Borders. The UK division of Borders separated from its parent and the owner of Paperchase in 2007, and all Borders stores closed on 22 December 2009. To replace these lost UK retail sites, Paperchase concessions were formed in a number of HMV and Waterstones stores during 2010.

In 2010, a management buy-out was completed, leaving the company owned by Primary Capital Partners LLP and its board of directors. In September 2010, Paperchase launched an online store, built on the Venda ecommerce platform.

Borders Group Inc. closed all of its stores in February 2011, 19 years after the Borders brothers sold the business and 16 years after becoming a public company. The company entered a company voluntary arrangement (similar to Chapter 11), which led to the closure of 399 stores and the liquidation of assets.

As of January 2013, the company had over 130 retail points of sale, a mix of concessions and standalone stores. These were primarily based in the UK, with several in Dubai and a few in Denmark, The Netherlands, France and Germany. One of their first flagship stores was on Tottenham Court Road and was known as 'Paperchase Heaven' because of its location, size and range of products. A new store opened in the White Rose Centre in Leeds in June 2013, and another flagship store was opened in March 2013 at Buchanan Street in Glasgow.

In January 2021, Paperchase was on the brink of administration after most of its stores were closed over the Christmas period because of COVID-19. The firm filed a notice to appoint administrators to give them breathing space while it worked out a rescue plan. At that time, the company had 127 stores and about 1,500 employees. Later that month, it was announced that Paperchase would be purchased by Primera Capital through a legal entity, Aspen Phoenix Newco Limited.

In August 2022, Paperchase was sold to a private investment firm led by the retail investor Steve Curtis. The company went into administration on 30 January 2023. Tesco purchased the brand and intellectual property, but not its 106 stores and website, on 31 January 2023, leaving the future of 820 staff in doubt.

== Closure ==
In February 2023, it was announced that no buyer had been found for the rest of the business. As a result, all 106 remaining stores were to close, and 900 staff were to be made redundant. The web store shut down on 17 February, and the last physical shops closed on 3 April 2023.

== Controversy ==
In February 2010, the company was accused of stealing artwork created by an independent British artist, Hidden Eloise. An artist working for the agency Gather No Moss eventually admitted tracing the artwork.

In November 2017, the company issued an apology for running an advert for free wrapping paper in the Daily Mail on Saturday 18 November, following a campaign by the group Stop Funding Hate. Journalists Julia Hartley-Brewer and Piers Morgan condemned the decision.
