= Stop Funding Hate =

British social media campaign

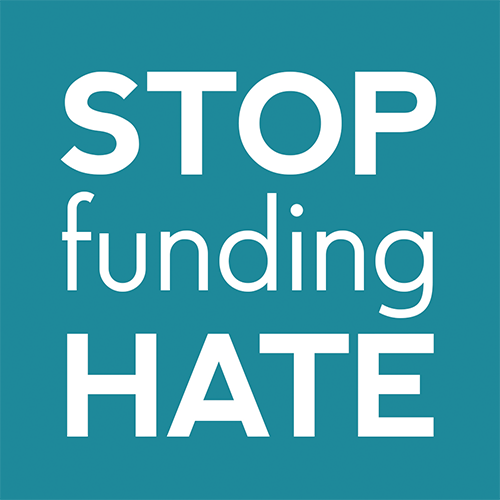
- The campaign's logo
- Formation: August 2016; 10 years ago
- Founder: Richard Cameron Wilson
- Type: Social media
- Registration no.: CIC 10737024
- Purpose: 70210 - Public relations and communications activities
- Location: United Kingdom
- Website: stopfundinghate.info

Stop Funding Hate is a pressure group which asks companies to stop advertising in, and thus stop providing funds for, certain British newspapers that it argues use "fear and division to sell more papers".

== Launch ==
The Stop Funding Hate campaign was established in August 2016 by Richard Wilson, a former Corporate Fundraising Officer at Amnesty International. The campaign gained over 70,000 likes on its Facebook page in the first three days of activity and the campaign's launch video was viewed over 6 million times. In February 2017, Stop Funding Hate launched a crowdfunding campaign to raise funds, finishing with £102,721 raised.

== Campaigns ==
The campaign has called on companies including Aldi, Asda, Barclays, British Airways, Co-op UK, Gillette, Iceland, John Lewis, Lego, Marks & Spencer, Morrisons, Virgin Media and Waitrose to cease advertising in newspapers such as The Sun, Daily Mail and Daily Express.

Stop Funding Hate's campaign targeting Virgin Media, claimed that their values were "totally at odds with the Sun's track record of misleading reporting", and was signed by over 40,000 people. Following their coverage of the high court's November ruling on Brexit, advertisers in the Daily Mail were targeted by the campaign and its supporters using the hashtag #StopFundingHate. In a Christmas campaign by Stop Funding Hate, the group released a mock advert in the style of John Lewis Christmas adverts, calling on the department store to stop advertising in certain newspapers.

In August 2017, Stop Funding Hate undertook its first street campaign in conjunction with the social justice charity Citizens UK. The campaign targeted mobile network operators including BT Mobile, EE Limited, O2, Sky Mobile, Tesco Mobile and Virgin Mobile UK using the slogan "Start Spreading Love".

In February 2020, Stop Funding Hate joined I Am Here International in a Valentine's Day action to combat hatred and extremism, inspired by the founder of the #ExtinguishHate campaign begun by Darryn Frost, the man who fought off a terrorist in the 2019 London Bridge stabbing using a narwhal tusk.

In May 2020, Stop Funding Hate urged organisations to withdraw their advertising from OpIndia, an Indian far-right website, after it published an article asserting that businesses should be able to declare that they do not hire Muslims.

In February 2021, Stop Funding Hate announced their boycott of the upcoming television news channel GB News, based on speculation of what the station would represent.

== Results ==
In September 2016, Specsavers withdrew an advertisement from the Daily Express after hundreds, including Stop Funding Hate, complained that it was funding "fear and division".

Gary Lineker showed support for the campaign, saying that he had spoken to Walkers about their advertisements in The Sun. Following calls from the campaign and its supporters, Lego announced in November 2016 that it was ending its advertising with the Daily Mail, stating they were "not planning any future promotional activity with the newspaper", making it the first company to end its advertising in one of the targeted newspapers since the campaign's inception. In February 2017, the internet service provider Plusnet withdrew adverts from The Sun and The Body Shop announced they had no future plans to advertise in the Daily Mail after social media criticism. In November 2017, Paperchase also announced that they would stop advertising in the Daily Mail, saying that they had "listened to customers".

A campaign which targeted The Co-operative Group led to their chief executive Richard Pennycook saying in 2016 that they would be "looking at our advertising for next year to see whether we can align it more closely with our natural sources of support rather than more generic media advertising". However, in a 2017 update by Nick Crofts, President of the National Members' Council, it was stated that after investigation, "Many people buy these papers at the Co-op and some of them will be our members. Advertising in these papers also drives sales which are important to our businesses".

Virgin Trains West Coast stopped selling the Daily Mail onboard the trains which it operates in conjunction with Stagecoach Group in November 2017. After criticisms that the move censored the newspapers that passengers could read, Richard Branson, founder of the Virgin Rail Group, reinstated the paper in January 2018. Speaking in a statement on his own behalf and that of Stagecoach chairman Brian Souter, Branson said: "Brian and I agree that we must not ever be seen to be censoring what our customers read and influencing their freedom of choice. Nor must we be seen to be moralising on behalf of others. Instead we should stand up for the values we hold dear and defend them publicly, as I have done with the Mail on many issues over the years."

== Finances ==
In addition to the £102,721 initially raised, a further crowdfunding campaign generated £80,251 from supporters in January 2018. The campaign that finished in March 2019 raised £5,067 against a target of £45,000.

Accounts filed at Companies House with a balance sheet date of 30 April 2018 showed that Stop Funding Hate had current assets of £130,549 and owed £130,549 to creditors. It had zero net assets and zero reserves.

The Community Interest Company Report (CIC 34) filed with the annual accounts showed that the Stop Funding Hate board had been remunerated.

== Criticism ==
Writing for the Press Gazette, Dominic Ponsford criticised Stop Funding Hate and its campaigners for "encouraging people to influence the content of newspapers they do not read themselves", and raised concerns about advertisers influencing the content of newspapers. In a response to Ponsford's article, Charlie Brinkhurst-Cuff argued that Ponsford did not consider the "total vacuum of responsibility within the journalism world when it comes to how our content is going to affect our audience".

In Spiked, Naomi Firsht described the campaign as "entirely about censorship", arguing that consumers should simply not buy newspapers if they disagree with their content. Writing in The Spectator, Brendan O'Neill described the campaign "elitist, repugnant and illiberal, as are all attempts at press censorship".

In an article for UnHerd, conservative author Douglas Murray accused the group of "using a deliberately vague definition of 'hate'" and only targeting what it perceives to be right-leaning media, claiming "its modus operandi is always the same: it identifies a conservative outlet full of "hate", and then lobbies its advertisers to pull their cash — thus eliminating one of the major revenue streams of the free press."

Media columnist Ian Burrell of the i newspaper wrote that the campaign to boycott GB News fed into the channel's belief that there is a cancel culture. Stop Funding Hate responded to allegations of censorship by saying that they "fully support freedom of choice & are not calling for any publication to be removed from sale". The Daily Mail, responding to Paperchase's decision to cease advertising with them, described Stop Funding Hate as "a small group of hard left Corbynist individuals seeking to suppress legitimate debate and impose their views on the media".

In August 2021, Stop Funding Hate was accused of breaching company laws by engaging in "political activity" by Members of UK Parliament in a letter to the British Secretary of State for Business Kwasi Kwarteng. In the letter, the Members of Parliament said: "We are concerned that since 2017 the campaign group Stop Funding Hate has been exploiting the prestige that is afforded by CIC status, and the privileged access that CICs have to many grants of taxpayers money, for overtly political means."

Stop Funding Hate is registered as a Community Interest Company (CIC), a type of organisation which should not be formed for political purposes. A spokesman for the Department of Business said: "We expect all Community Interest Companies to act in accordance with their legal obligations, and are clear that they should not be formed for political purposes, or have engagement in political activities among their main objectives". Stop Funding Hate did not respond to the criticism from Members of Parliament at the time.

In July 2024, Stop Funding Hate announced that it would become a Company Limited by Guarantee, ending its CIC status and merging with its sister (climate-focused) campaign Stop Funding Heat.

== See also ==
- Sleeping Giants
- Center for Countering Digital Hate
