= Richard Ashby Wilson =

American anthropologist

Richard Ashby Wilson is an American–British social anthropologist of law and human rights. He is a Professor of Anthropology at Princeton University and the co-director of the Princeton University Human Rights Initiative since September of 2025. Previously, he served as the Gladstein Distinguished professor of Human Rights and Professor of Anthropology and Law at the University of Connecticut. In 2021, Wilson became the Associate Dean of Faculty Development and Intellectual Life at the University of Connecticut School of Law. Wilson established the interdisciplinary Human Rights Institute at the University of Connecticut and was the Director of the Human Rights Institute from 2003 to 2013. Wilson is one of the founders of the anthropology of human rights and was editor and an author of Human Rights, Culture and Context (1997), the first edited volume in the field of the anthropology of human rights.

Wilson argued that anthropology needed to go beyond the universalism/relativism debate and study empirically the globalization of human rights in specific locales. Wilson's subsequent work in the anthropology of law has analyzed the operation of national truth and reconciliation commissions and international criminal courts. His recent book Writing History in International Criminal Trials (Cambridge University Press, 2011) was selected by Choice Magazine as an "Outstanding Academic Title" in January 2012. In "Writing History in International Criminal Trials", Wilson examines the role that history plays in international criminal proceedings.

Wilson's 2017 book Incitement on Trial: Prosecuting International Speech Crimes deals with incitement to genocide and related offenses against international criminal law.

Wilson has applied insights from his legal and anthropological scholarship to pressing policy issues. He is a frequent commentator in the press on a range of current affairs topics such as incitement to violence and insurrection, hate speech on social media, and immigration policy in the news media, including The Washington Post, the Los Angeles Times, and the Guardian. From 2009 to 2014, he was chair of the Connecticut State Advisory Committee to the US Commission on Civil Rights and focused on racial profiling in traffic stops. In 2021, he was appointed to the Hate Crimes Advisory Council to advise Governor Lamont and the state legislature of Connecticut on measures to combat hate crimes in the state.

== Publications ==
Representative publications include:

- “Hate Speech on Social Media: Towards a Context-Specific Content Moderation Policy.” Co-authored with Molly K. Land, Connecticut Law Review, 2021, 52(3): 1029–1076.
- “How Propaganda Works: Nationalism, Revenge and Empathy in Serbia.” Co-authored with Jordan Kiper and Yeongjin Gwon. Journal of Cognition and Culture, 2020, (20): 403–431. doi:10.1163/15685373-12340091.
- "Incitement in an Era of Populism: Updating Brandenburg After Charlottesville.” Co-Authored with Jordan Kiper, University of Pennsylvania Journal of Law and Public Affairs, 2020, 5(2): 56–121.
- “The Digital Ethnography of Law: Studying Online Hate Speech Online and Offline.” Journal of Legal Anthropology. 2019, Summer. 3(1): 1–20. doi:10.3167/jla.2019.030101.
- Incitement on Trial: Prosecuting International Speech Crimes. 2017. Cambridge: Cambridge University Press.
- A Handbook of Social Anthropology. 2012. Ed., with Richard Fardon, Olivia Harris, Trevor Marchand, Mark Nuttall, Cris Shore. Volumes 1–2. London: Sage.
- Writing History in International Criminal Trials. 2011. Cambridge: Cambridge University Press. Selected as a Choice “Outstanding Academic Title” by the American Library Association.
- Humanitarianism and Suffering: The Mobilization of Empathy. 2008. Ed., with Richard D. Brown. Cambridge: Cambridge University Press.
- Human Rights in the “War on Terror.” 2005. Ed. Cambridge: Cambridge University Press.
- Human Rights in Global Perspective. 2003. Ed. with Jonathan Mitchell. London, New York: Routledge. ISBN 9780203506271
- The Politics of Truth and Reconciliation in South Africa: legitimizing the post-apartheid state. 2001. Cambridge: Cambridge University Press.
- Culture and Rights: Anthropological Perspectives. 2001. Ed. with Jane Cowan and Marie B. Dembour. Cambridge: Cambridge University Press.
- Human Rights, Culture and Context. 1997. Ed. London: Pluto Press.
- Maya Resurgence in Guatemala: Q’eqchi’ Experiences. 1995. Norman, University of Oklahoma Press.
- Low Intensity Democracy: Political Power in the New World Order. 1993.Ed. with Barry Gills and Joel Rocamora. London: Pluto Press. ISBN 9780745305356
