= Nazis, Islamists, and the Making of the Modern Middle East =

Book by Wolfgang G. Schwanitz and Barry Rubin

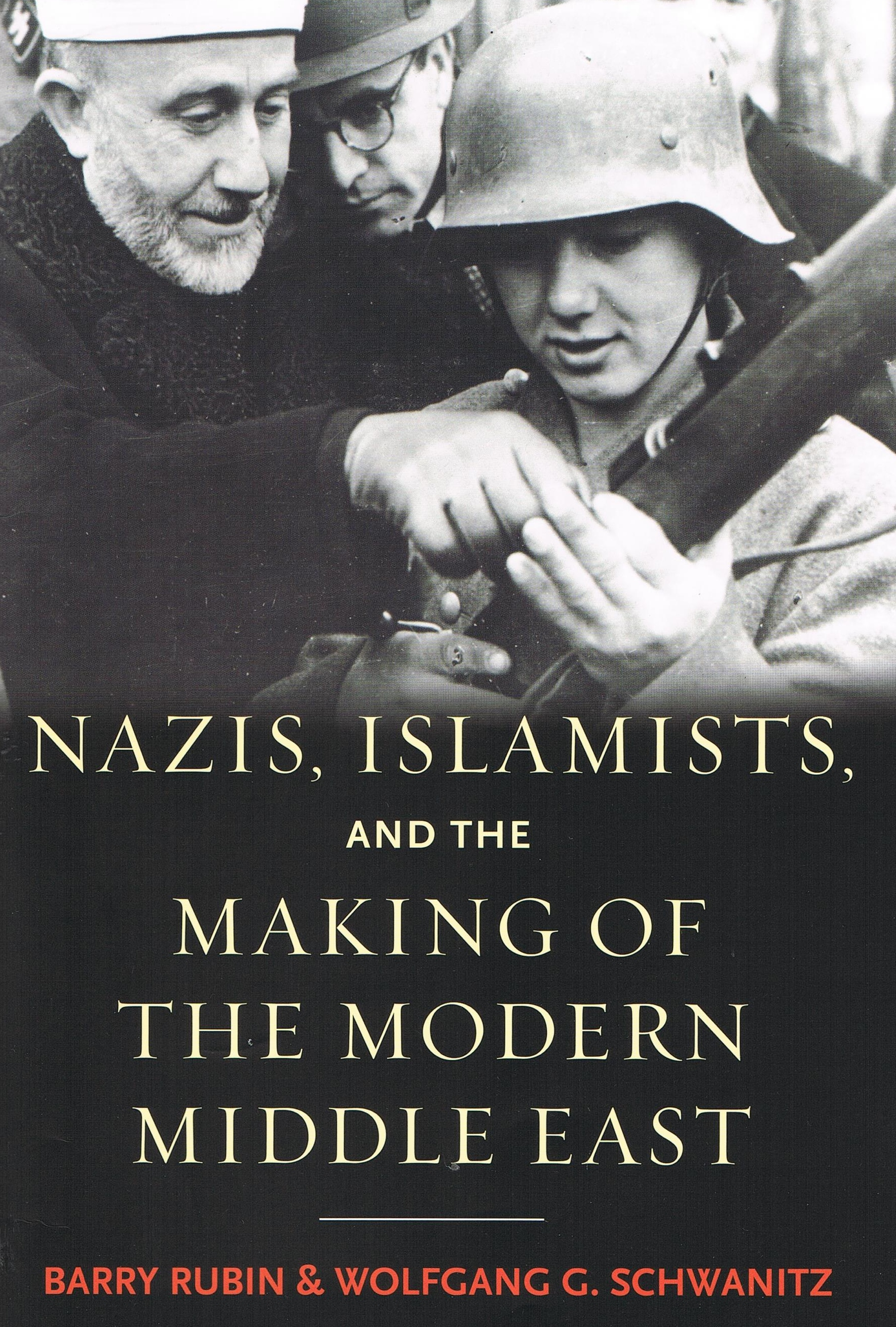
- Author: Wolfgang G. Schwanitz, Barry Rubin
- Language: English
- Subject: Nazism and Islamism
- Publisher: Yale University Press
- Publication date: February 28, 2014
- Publication place: United States
- Media type: Print (hardcover, paperback), e-book
- Pages: 360
- ISBN: 978-0300140903
- OCLC: 840803712

Nazis, Islamists, and the Making of the Modern Middle East is a 2014 Yale University Press book by German historian Wolfgang G. Schwanitz and Israeli historian Barry Rubin. The authors argue that there is a high degree of similarity in the ideologies of Nazism, radical Arab nationalism, and Islamism. The book received a mixed reception, with some historians criticizing the authors' methodology and conclusions.

== Content ==
The authors start their analysis in the nineteenth century, when Germany, seeking colonial expansion, sought to displace British, French, and Russian influence in the Middle East, with little or no success. However Germany developed ties with radical Arab nationalist groups, which survived Germany's defeat in World War I. The rise of Nazism strengthened these connections, and interactions between Nazis and Islamists before and during World War II make up a significant part of the book. They continue by describing how the Grand Mufti of Jerusalem, Amin al-Husseini, an influential Arab leader and Nazi collaborator, escaped prosecution after the war and tried to thwart Jewish attempts to establish the State of Israel, and the lives of ex-Nazis who found refuge in Arab states.

The authors argue that there is a high degree of similarity in the ideologies of Nazism, radical Arab nationalism, and Islamism, an argument first made by the mufti. One of the most striking similarities, according to the authors, is that all three ideologies promote extreme antisemitism and blame Jews for all the problems in the world.

The book analyzes the role of Nazi propaganda and the mufti, in spreading Nazi ideology and inciting antisemitism in the Middle East. The book also charts the development of the Middle East as it became modern, leading reviewer Johannes Houwink ten Cate to describe the title as apt.

== Reception ==
Holocaust scholar Jeffrey Herf excoriates the book, writing that Schwanitz and Rubin "ignore the previous scholarship on Holocaust decision-making as well as the existing scholarship on Husseini's collaboration with the Nazis. Partly as a result, they exaggerate the Mufti's impact on Nazi policy. They turn a series of coincidental correlations in time into causal chains." Reviewing the book in the Israel Journal of Foreign Affairs, Matthias Küntzel raises a number of issues with the book, identifying some of its claims as "nothing but speculation" and concluding that "certain facts that do not fit the picture have simply been left out," damaging the book's credibility. In another article in the same journal, Meir Litvak calls the book "controversial" and argues its "allegations, however, do not stand the test of historical scrutiny and have been largely discounted."

In his review, Houwink ten Cate describes the book as "seminal" and "extremely well-researched and documented" but makes a "minor criticism": he is not convinced by Schwanitz and Rubin's argument that the mufti convinced the Nazis to commit the Holocaust, which he considers to be refuted by research by Christopher R. Browning that the authors ignored. David Mikics concurs, arguing that "the notion that al-Husaini played a key role in Hitler’s settling on the Final Solution is based on one piece of thin hearsay evidence." He calls this claim "implausible, even silly." Nils Riecken makes a similar criticism, that "temporal proximity remains their only argument." He also criticizes the book for ignoring other research on the Holocaust, and sees the authors' methodology as "deeply problematic." However, as one of the authors Schwanitz responded to Mikics, that he misrepresents the book and argues it "is not a biography of the grand mufti of Jerusalem Amin al-Husaini [...] and Mikics fails to show how it compares to related works."

David Rodman described the book as a "fascinating and insightful volume". Rodman opined that Nazism is no longer prominent in the West, but radical Arab nationalism and Islamism continue to be prominent in the Middle East. He called the book an "indispensable guide to explaining why the greater Middle East has been an utter shambles for the past seven decades". On the other hand, a review in Countercurrents.org questions whether the book contributes anything of value due to its ideological biases, "highly problematic theses," and "bizarre theories." Mia Lee contends that the book's "focus on the Mufti also creates a false link between contemporary anti-Semitism in the Middle East and the Nazis’ racial programme."

This is not a false link but an old one, responds Schwanitz. The perpetrators and their ideologies were connected before, in, and after both world wars. Born in the two decades before 1900, some experienced and later lead multiple genocides against local minorities while establishing from 1914 to 1918 a German-Ottoman axis and from 1939 to 1945 a Nazi-Islamist axis. Often the same persons connected both regions also by their genocidal cooperation based on nationalism, racism, and anti-Semitism. These efforts were led on the German side by about 100 key officials, politicians and Middle Eastern experts, and on the other side Islamists and nationalists that drove ahead their joint jihadization of Islamism.

Schwanitz shows this with the example of Jerusalem's Kedem auction house that posted three of six previously unknown photos on the Internet. On one photo taken in 1942, the grand mufti al-Husaini, Iraq’s former prime minister Rashid Ali al-Kailani, and the Indian nationalist Subhas Chandra Bose inspect Trebbin’s satellite camp of the concentration camp Sachsenhausen near Berlin along with two Nazi officials who were involved in the Holocaust. The photos of the visit to a Nazi camp associated with an SS artillery training school, both Arab leaders’ written genocidal pact with the Nazis, and their subsequent close involvement with the Final Solution demonstrate that they wanted the Jews of the Mideast to share the same fate as the Jews of Europe.
