= Wibke Kristin Timmermann =

German scholar

Wibke Kristin Timmermann is a German scholar of international law. She was awarded the Henry Dunant Prize 2006 for her thesis "Incitement, Instigation, Hate Speech and War Propaganda in International Law".

== Works ==
- Timmermann, Wibke K. (2014). Incitement in International Law. Routledge. ISBN 978-1-317-66966-1.
