= Dagens Juridik =

Swedish online newspaper focused on law and the judicial system

- Website type: Legal periodical
- Headquarters: Sweden
- Owner: Blendow Group
- Website: DagensJuridik.se
- Commercial: Yes
- Launched: 2007; 19 years ago
- Current status: Online

Dagens Juridik (first launched in 2007) is a Swedish online newspaper focused on law and the judicial system. The publications also runs a judicial database for legal scholars.

It contains reporting on legislation, rulings and judgments from courts and authorities as well as features on current topics and interviews with lawyers. Publication's editorial staff consists of lawyers and journalists.

== Editors-in-Chief ==
- Peter Johansson (2007–2010)
- Fredrik Olsson, now Svärd (2010–2012)
- Stefan Wahlberg (2012–2019)
- Eric Tagesson (2019–)
