= Counterspeech =

Speech countering socially harmful speech

Counterspeech is a tactic of countering hate speech or misinformation by presenting an alternative narrative rather than with censorship of the offending speech. It also means responding to hate speech with empathy and challenging the hate narratives, rather than responding with more hate speech directed in the opposite direction. According to advocates, counterspeech is more likely to result in deradicalization and peaceful resolution of conflict.

Susan Benesch of the Dangerous Speech Project has articulated a taxonomy of counterspeech which includes eight specific strategies. They include:

1. Presentation of facts to correct misstatements or misperceptions
2. Pointing out hypocrisy or contradictions
3. Warning of possible offline and online consequences of speech
4. Identification with original speaker or target group
5. Denouncing speech as hateful or dangerous
6. Use of visual media
7. Use of humor
8. Use of a particular tone, e.g. an empathetic one.

The use of counterspeech is of particular significance on social media. A report published by Facebook in July 2021 under its "Courage Against Hate" initiative provides information on its own "Counterspeech Hub" website, and includes case studies on several organisations or movements that employ counterspeech as a strategy for countering hate speech. Two of the most prominent of these are I Am Here International and the Online Civil Courage Initiative (OCCI), a partnership between the Institute for Strategic Dialogue and Facebook.

A Swiss study reported in December 2021 on a field experiment using three different strategies of counterspeech, using single responses to xenophobic posts on Twitter: humour, warning of consequences, and empathy. It found that only empathy had a small but measurable effect on the hate speech, with the authors suggesting that future research should focus on repeated interventions.

== See also ==
- Deradicalization
- Life After Hate
