= Callixte Kalimanzira =

Rwandan politician

Callixte Kalimanzira (1953 – October 1, 2015) was the interior minister of the interim government of Rwanda during the 1994 genocide.

Kalimanzira was born in 1953 in Muganza Commune, Butare Prefecture.

Kalimanzira was indicted in 2005 by the International Criminal Tribunal for Rwanda for his actions during the genocide on three counts: genocide, complicity in genocide and direct and public incitement to commit genocide; he pleaded not guilty. On June 22, 2009, Kalimanzira was sentenced to 30 years in prison for two counts of genocide and direct and public incitement to commit genocide. The sentence was reduced on appeal to 25 years imprisonment in October 2010. Kalimanzira died on October 1, 2015, while serving his sentence in Benin.
