= Susan Benesch =

American journalist and scholar of speech

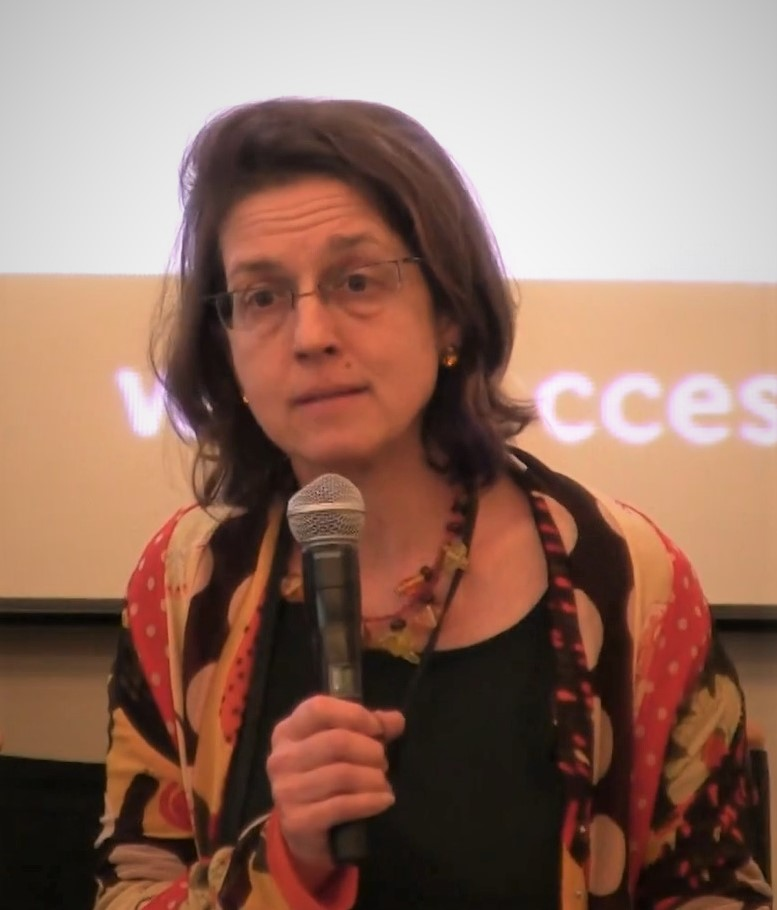
Benesch moderates a discussion for Access Now in 2014

Susan Benesch (born 1964) is an American journalist and scholar of speech who is known for founding the Dangerous Speech Project. Benesch is a free speech advocate, recommending the use of counterspeech rather than censorship to delegitimize harmful speech.

== Early life and education ==
Benesch was born in 1964 in New York. She is of Czech ancestry on her father's side, and her family was described as "upper-middle class". Benesch described herself as descending from "immigrants, refugees and people who were killed because other people had been taught to hate them".

After graduating from Columbia University, she worked in journalism, including as staff writer for the Miami Herald in Haiti and St. Petersburg Times' correspondent in Latin America. She is fluent in Spanish. Benesch earned a JD at Yale in 2001 and an LL.M. from Georgetown University Law Center in 2008.

== Career ==
Benesch worked for the NGOs Amnesty International and Human Rights First, and is currently the faculty associate of Berkman Klein Center for Internet and Society at Harvard University. She is also an adjunct professor at American University.

She founded the Dangerous Speech Project in 2010 with a grant from the MacArthur Foundation.

== Views ==
In regulating "dangerous speech", Benesch seeks to minimize the harm to freedom of speech, and advocates the use of counterspeech over censorship. Counterspeech means responding to hate speech with empathy and challenging the hate narratives, rather than responding with more hate speech directed in the opposite direction. According to Benesch, counterspeech is more likely to result in deradicalization and peaceful resolution of conflict. Counterspeech, which seeks to delegitimize rather than stifle harmful speech, can often incorporate humor. In contrast, she believes that censorship is ineffective at stopping hate narratives. For example, a South African politician was convicted for hate speech for singing the Shoot the Boer song, but his supporters sang the song shortly after the conviction. Benesch is a critic of United States president Donald Trump, saying that he operates in a gray area of "dangerous speech" such as when he suggested that supporters should use the Second Amendment on Hillary Clinton. She describes Trump as "undermining the extent to which his supporters trust the essential institutions and practices of U.S. democracy", which she finds "deeply irresponsible".

== Benesch test ==
In a 2008 article, "Vile Crime or Inalienable Right: Defining Incitement to Genocide", she proposed a "Reasonably Probable Consequences test" for criminalizing incitement to genocide:

1. The message must be understood by the audience as a direct call to violence against the targeted group.
2. Speaker must have influence over their audience
3. The target group must have already suffered "recent" violence
4. Contrasting or opposing ideas must not be available (indicating that the marketplace of ideas has broken down)
5. Audience conditioning: the targets must be dehumanized or accused of plotting genocide against the actual perpetrators
6. Audience must have heard previous similar messages.

Although he found the article "thought-provoking", Gregory Gordon criticized it as he favors a broader approach to criminalizing what he terms "atrocity speech", and because he believed that her criteria do not incorporate the precedent of the International Criminal Tribunal for Rwanda. In response to Gordon's criticism she revised her test in "The Ghost of Causation in International Speech Crime Cases".

== Works ==
- Benesch, Susan (2008). "Vile Crime or Inalienable Right: Defining Incitement to Genocide". Virginia Journal of International Law. 48 (3). SSRN 1121926.
- Benesch, Susan (2013). "The Ghost of Causation in International Speech Crime Cases". In Dojcinovic, Predrag (ed.). Propaganda, War Crimes Trials and International Law: From Speakers' Corner to War Crimes. Routledge. ISBN 978-1-136-58840-2.
