= Gisagara District =

Coordinates: 2°37′S 29°51′E

- District
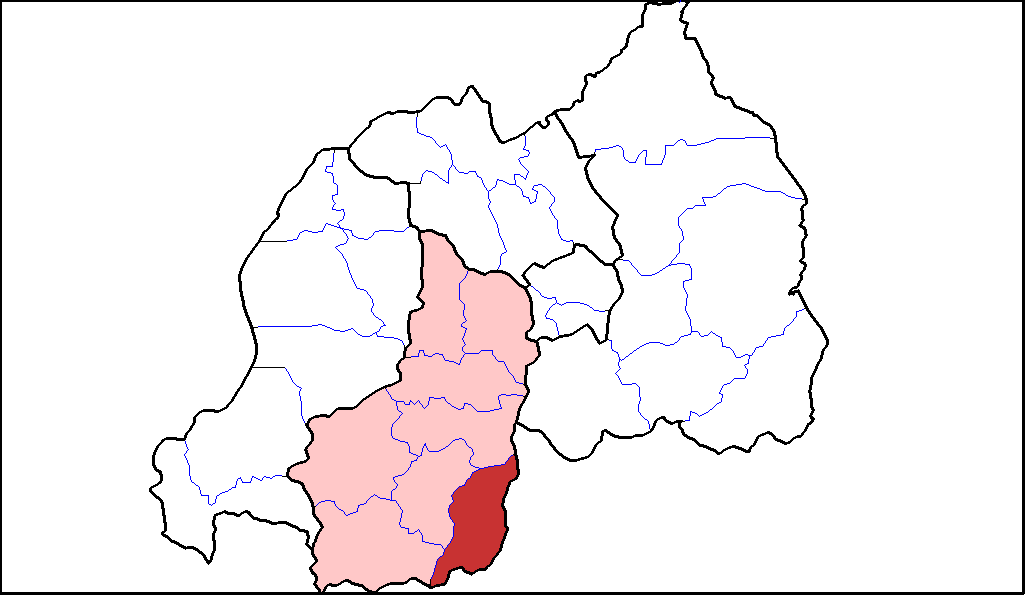
- Shown within Southern Province and Rwanda
- Country: Rwanda
- Province: Southern
- Capital: Ndora

Area
  - District: 680 km^{2} (260 sq mi)

Population (2022 census)
  - District: 397,051
  - Density: 580/km^{2} (1,500/sq mi)
  - Urban: 13,513
  - Rural: 383,538

Gisagara is a district (akarere) in Southern Province, Rwanda. Its headquarters is Ndora.

== Geography ==
The district lies just to the East of Butare city, along the border with Burundi.

== Sectors ==
Gisagara district is divided into 13 sectors (imirenge): Gikonko, Gishubi, Kansi, Kibilizi, Kigembe, Mamba, Muganza, Mugombwa, Mukindo, Musha, Ndora, Nyanza and Save.

== Mugombwa refugee camp ==
The Mugombwa refugee camp is home to over 7300 Congolese refugees. A Turi Kumwe Centre, housing "a Police post as well as migration and camp management offices" was opened in the camp in 2014.
