= Ananie Nkurunziza =

Rwandan journalist

- Born: 1950s
- Occupations: Radio presenter (animateur), journalist

Ananie Nkurunziza (born 1950s) was a presenter (animateur) on the Rwandan radio station Radio Télévision Libre des Mille Collines, which played a significant role in promoting the Rwandan genocide. Like the station's other broadcasters, Nkurunziza incited violence against Tutsi and moderate Hutu on the air.

== Background ==
On air, Nkurunziza acted as a political analyst, taking on the role of a serious intellectual and recounting foreign news. Segments by Nkurunziza accounted for approximately 11% of RTLM airtime. As an animateur, he received the fourth most airtime.

Before joining RTLM, Nkurunziza worked for an intelligence officer. He maintained his links to the Rwandan intelligence and police communities during his tenure at RTLM.

Nkurunziza's whereabouts were unknown as of 2007.

== See also ==
- List of people who disappeared mysteriously: post-1970
