= Wolfgang G. Schwanitz =

German-American Middle East historian (born 1955)

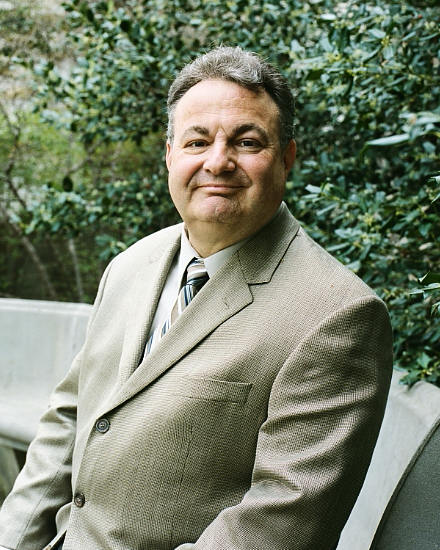
- Wolfgang G. Schwanitz, 2008.
- Born: 8 December 1955 (age 70); Magdeburg, Germany
- Education: Leipzig University (Ph.D.), Free University of Berlin
- Occupations: Arabist, Economist, Historian of the Middle East
- Known for: Publications about America, the Middle East and Germany
- Notable work: Islam in Europe, Revolts in the Middle East
- Website: www.trafoberlin.de

Wolfgang G. Schwanitz (born 1955) is a German-American Middle East historian. He is a specialist in comparative studies of modern international relations between the United States, the Middle East, and Europe. Schwanitz is known for his research on relations between Arabs, Jews, and Germans, and on the history of German relations with the Middle East.

== Background ==
Born in 1955 in Magdeburg, Schwanitz lived for seven years in Cairo, Egypt, as his parents were diplomats. Back in East Germany, he attended the Max Planck high school of Berlin. In 1982 he finished five years of Middle Eastern studies as Arabist/economist at Leipzig University. In 1985 he completed his Ph.D. at Leipzig, on Egypt's open-door policy.

== Career ==
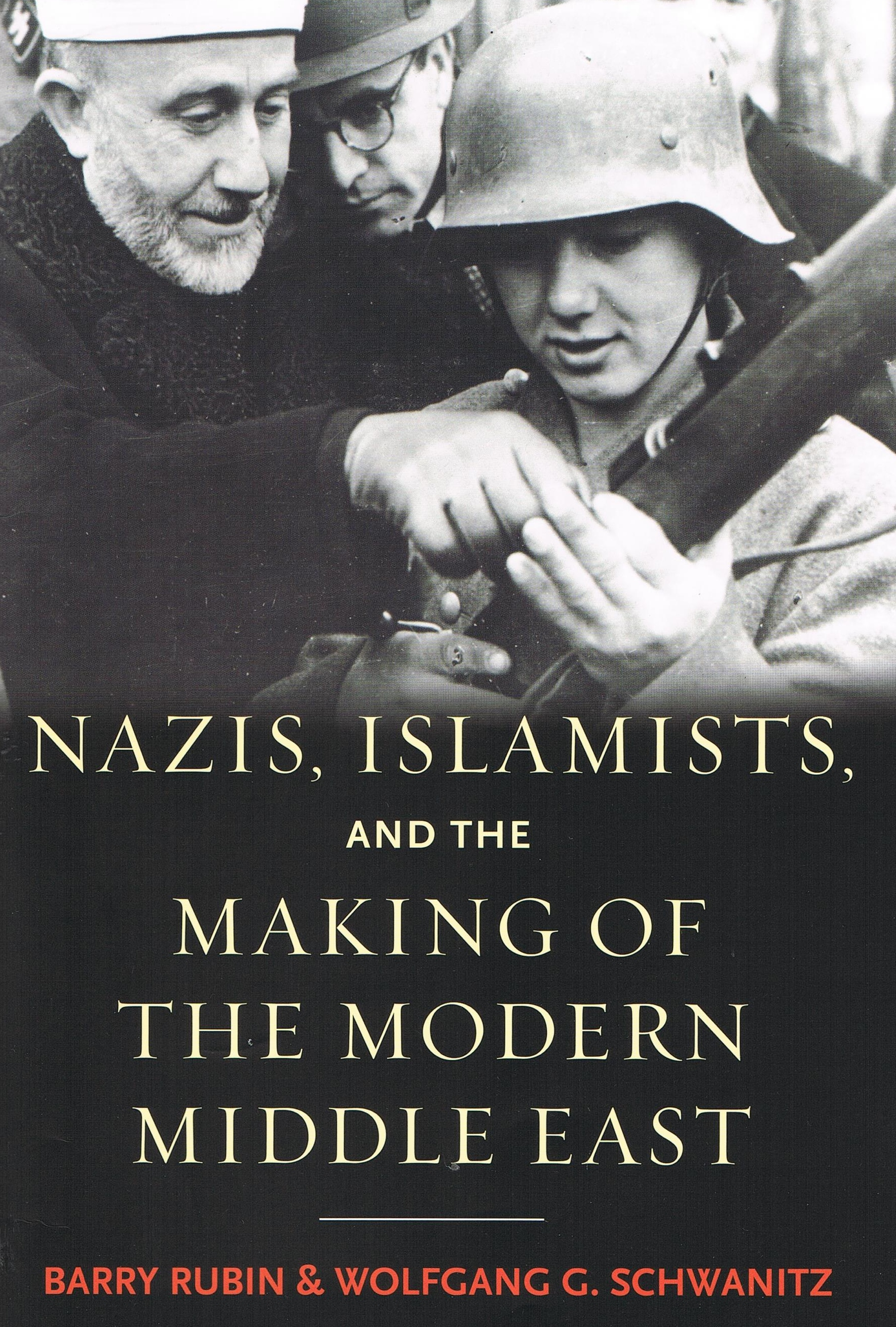

In Berlin he headed the research group on Middle Eastern history at the Academy of Sciences. He has taught at Humboldt University, University of Potsdam, and Free University of Berlin. After German reunification, he worked (1990–95) at the Modern Orient Center — founded by the Max Planck Society of Munich — and published books on relations between Germany and the Middle East. In the 1990s he was visiting fellow at CEDEJ, Cairo (1992–93), at Princeton University (1995–97), and at the German-American Center for Visiting Scholars of the German Historical Institute in Washington, D.C. (1998). In Princeton, he finished two volumes on the history of Germans in the Middle East after World War II.

In his history of the German Orient Bank he showed by records from American and German archives how Jewish gold looted by Nazis in occupied Europe was sold in Turkey via the German Orient Bank. This bank was founded in 1906 by Dresdner Bank in Berlin, the second-largest German bank, and served 40 years in the Middle East.

In 2000, he settled near Princeton, United States. He researches and teaches Arabic, world history, and Middle Eastern history at local colleges, among them Burlington County College in Pemberton, New Jersey, and Rider University in Lawrenceville, New Jersey, (2004–08). He edits a book series of comparative studies on America-Mideast-Europe. He was visiting professor at the Rubin Center for Research in International Affairs at the Interdisciplinary Center (IDC) Herzliya, Israel (2007-2017), (Hochberg Family, 2014-2017) Writing Fellow at the Middle East Forum and he is Senior Fellow at the Foreign Policy Research Institute of Philadelphia, Pennsylvania, where he became the Inaugural Bernard Lewis Fellow in 2021.

His works on German and American Islam policy where translated into eight languages. Schwanitz authored ten and edited ten books. He authored 90 book chapters on history and politics of the Middle East in international relations since 1798, as modernity came to the Middle East.

== Selected bibliography ==
=== Books ===
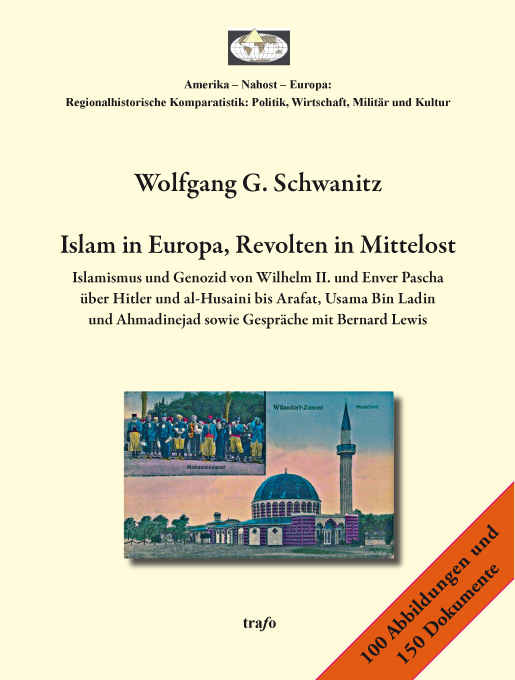
Islam in Europe, Revolts in the Middle East.

- Middle East Mosaic 2016 Egypt's Antiislamism, Israel, Arabia and Iran's Nuclear Deal, Islamic State with Caliphate and Abd al-Fattah as-Sisi, Donald J. Trump and Angela Merkel. Trafo Publisher Weist: Berlin 2019
- Middle East Mosaic 2015 Egypt's Change, Israel and Irans Nuclear Deal, Islamic State Iraq-Syria and Barack H. Obama, Benjamin Netanjahu and Angela Merkel. Trafo Publisher Weist: Berlin 2017
- Middle East Mosaic 2014, Afghanistan's Vote, Israel's Missile War, Caliphate Iraq-Syria and Barack H. Obama, Pope Francis and Angela Merkel. Trafo Publisher Weist: Berlin 2016
- Middle East Mosaic 2013, Egypt's Revolt, Syria's Civil War, Iran's Nuclear Deal and Barack H. Obama, Abd al-Fattah as-Sisi and Angela Merkel. Trafo Publisher Weist: Berlin 2015
- Nazis, Islamists, and the Making of the Modern Middle East, Yale University Press: New Haven & London 2014, with Barry Rubin
- Islam in Europe, Revolts in the Middle East. Islamism and Genocide from Wilhelm II and Enver Pasha via Hitler and al-Husaini to Arafat, Usama Bin Ladin and Ahmadinejad and talks with Bernard Lewis. Trafo Publisher Weist: Berlin 2013, 2014, 2nd.ed.
- Germany and the Middle East in the Cold War, University Publishers: Leipzig 2006, ed.
- Germany and the Middle East, 1871–1945, Wiener 2004, (and Iberoamericana: Madrid 2004)
- Germany and the Middle East, 1871–1945, Wiener: Princeton Papers 2004, ed.
- Gold, Bankers, and Diplomats: A History of the German Orient Bank, Trafo Berlin 2002
- August Bebel: The Muhammadan-Arab Periode of Culture, Edition East: Berlin 1999, ed.
- 125 Years of Suez Canal, Olms: Hildesheim 1998, ed.
- Egypt and Germany in the 19th-20th Century, Dar ath-Thaqafa: Cairo 1998, with Wagih Atiq
- Germans in the Mideast 1946-65, Princeton 1995, 2 vols.
- Beyond of the Legends: Arabs, Jews, Germans, Dietz: Berlin 1994, ed.
- The G.D.R. and the Third World, 1949–90, Lit: Muenster 1993-95, 3 vols., co-ed.
- Berlin-Cairo: Then and Today, German-Egyptian Society: Berlin 1991, ed.
- Egypt's Infitah Open-Door Policy, Department of Afro-Asian Studies: Leipzig 1985
- Schwanitz, Wolfgang G. (2008). "The Bellicose Birth of Euro-Islam in Berlin". In Al-Hamarneh, Ala; Thielmann, Jorn (eds.). Islam and Muslims in Germany. Vol. 7. Koninklijke Brill NV. ISBN 978-90-04-15866-5.

== Literature on W.G. Schwanitz ==
- Clemens Heni: Schadenfreude. Islamforschung und Antisemitismus in Deutschland nach 9/11, Edition Critic: Berlin 2011
- Stefan Bollinger, Ulrich van der Heyden (eds.): German Unity and Elite Change in East Germany, Trafo: Berlin 2002
- Ekkehard Rudolph: State of Art: Cultural Studies and Humanities on the Muslim World, Orient Institute: Hamburg 1999
- Wolf-Hagen Krauth, Ralf Wolz (eds.): Humanities and Re-Unification, Academy: Berlin 1998
- Kai Hafez: Oriental Studies in the G.D.R., 1969–89, Orient Institute: Hamburg 1995
- Emma Murphy, Gerd Nonneman, Neil Quilliam: Middle East & North Africa: A Directory of Specialists and Institutions, Eurames: Durham 1993
