= Larry May (philosopher) =

American philosopher and author

Larry May is an American philosopher. He is W. Alton Jones Professor of Philosophy at Vanderbilt University and the author of several books. His theory of international law has been described as "neo-Grotian".

== Works ==
- Applied Ethics: A Multicultural Approach, sixth edition, (co-edited with Jill Delston), Routledge, New York, 2016.
- Sharing Responsibility. University of Chicago Press. 1992. ISBN 978-0-226-51168-9.
- Crimes against Humanity. Cambridge University Press. 2005.
- War Crimes and Just War. Cambridge University Press. 2007.
- Aggression and Crimes against Peace. Cambridge University Press. 2008.
- Genocide: A Normative Account. Cambridge University Press. 2010.
- Global Justice and Due Process. Cambridge University Press. 2011.
- After War Ends: A Philosophical Perspective. Cambridge University Press. 2012.
- Limiting Leviathan: Hobbes on Law and International Affairs. Oxford University Press. 2013. ISBN 978-0-19-968279-9.
