= United Nations Security Council Resolution 989 =

United Nations Security Council resolution

UN Security Council Resolution 989
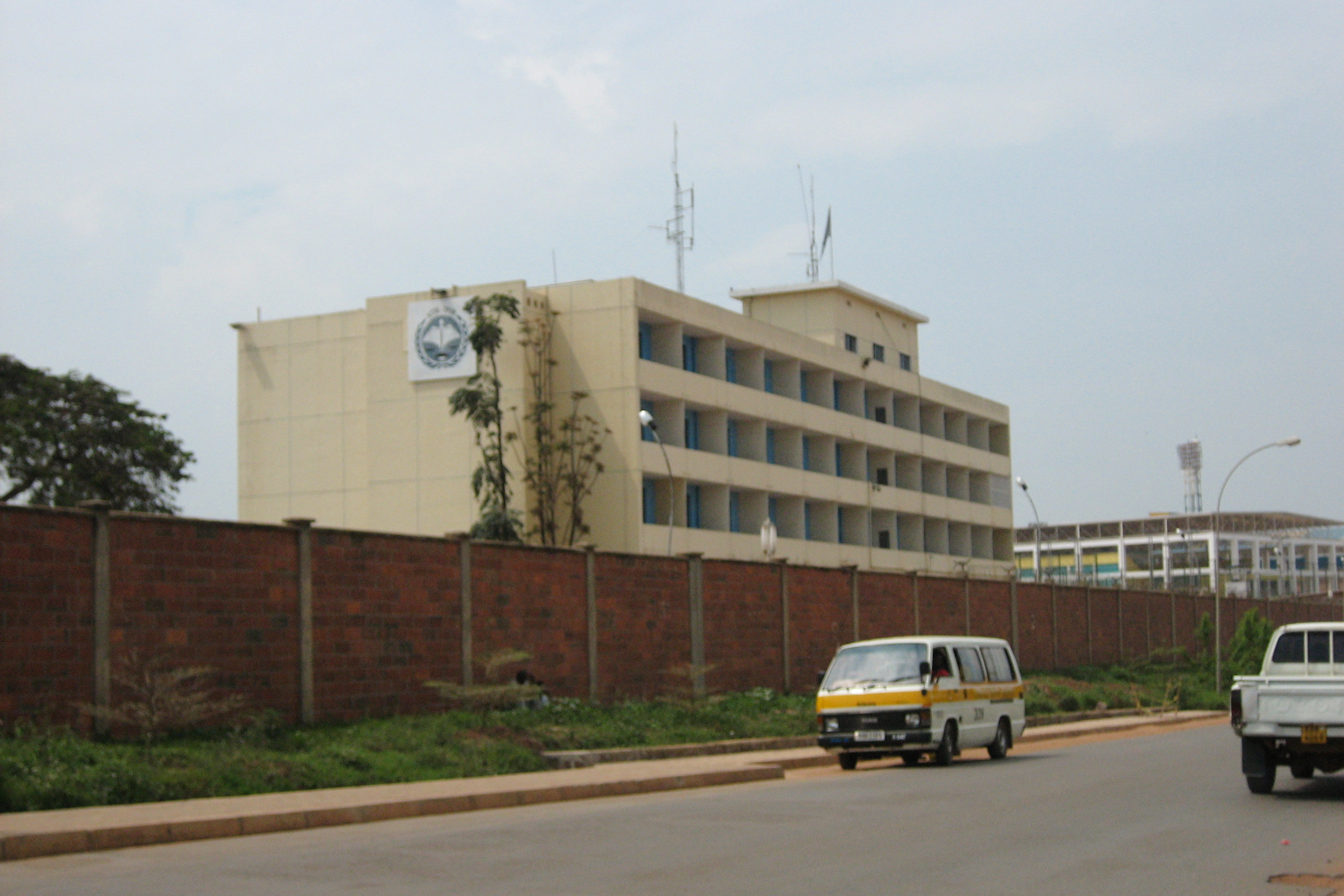
- ICTR building in Kigali
- Date: 24 April 1995
- Meeting no.: 3,524
- Code: S/RES/989 (Document)
- Subject: Rwanda
- Voting summary: 15 voted for; None voted against; None abstained
- Result: Adopted

Security Council composition
- Permanent members: China; France; Russia; United Kingdom; United States
- Non-permanent members: Argentina; Botswana; Czech Republic; Germany; Honduras; Indonesia; Italy; Nigeria; Oman; Rwanda

United Nations Security Council Resolution 989, adopted unanimously on 24 April 1995, after recalling Resolution 955 (1994), the council listed the nominations for judges at the International Criminal Tribunal for Rwanda.

The list of nominations was as follows:

- Lennart Aspegren (Sweden)
- Kevin Haugh (Ireland)
- Laïty Kama (Senegal)
- T. H. Khan (Bangladesh)
- Wamulungwe Mainga (Zambia)
- Yakov A. Ostrovsky (Russia)
- Navanethem Pillay (South Africa)
- Edilbert Razafindralambo (Madagascar)
- William H. Sekule (Tanzania)
- Anne Marie Stoltz (Norway)
- Jiri Toman (Czech Republic/Switzerland)
- Lloyd G. Williams (Jamaica/Saint Kitts and Nevis)

== See also ==
- List of United Nations Security Council Resolutions 901 to 1000 (1994–1995)
- Rwandan Civil War
- Rwandan genocide
- United Nations Observer Mission Uganda–Rwanda
