= Aspegren =

Aspegren is a surname. Notable people with the surname include:

- August Aspegren (1844–1912), Finnish stage actor
- Aurora Aspegren (1844–1911), Finnish stage actress, wife of August
- Felipe Aspegren (born 1994), Finnish football player
- Lennart Aspegren (born 1931), Swedish judge
