= August Westermark =

Finnish-Swedish actor and director (1834–1894

August Westermark (5 October 1834 – 15 December 1894) was a Finnish-Swedish stage actor and theatre director. He played an important role in the development of the Finnish language theater in Finland.

Westermark made his debut in Stockholm in 1857. He was active in travelling Swedish theater companies and engaged at the Swedish Theatre in Helsinki in Finland in 1869–70. In 1870, he founded the first travelling theater company in Finland which performed in the Finnish language as well as Swedish, when previously theater in Finland had always been conducted in Swedish. When the Finnish National Theatre, the first Finnish language permanent theater, was founded in 1872 under the management of Kaarlo Bergbom and Oskari Vilho, the theater was staffed by the members of the Westermark theater company, notably Aurora Aspegren and August Aspegren.
