= Bergbom =

Bergbom is a Swedish-language surname associated with the prominent Bergbom family.. Notable people with the surname include:

- Emilie Bergbom (1834−1905), Finnish theater director
- Kaarlo Bergbom (1843−1906), Finnish theater director
- Miko Bergbom (born 1996), Finnish politician
- Ossian Wuorenheimo (birth name Bergbom 1845−1917), Finnish politician

The National Biography of Finland lists several more notable persons that belong to the Bergbom family:

- Gustaf Bergbom ((1785–1860)
- Johan Gustav Bergbom (1818–1893)
- Johan Erik Bergbom (1796–1869)
- Augusta af Heurlin (birth name Bergbom; 1847–1918)
