= August Aspegren =

Finnish stage actor

August Aspegren (1844-1912) was a Finnish stage actor. He belonged to the elite of the pioneer generation of actors at the Finnish National Theatre.

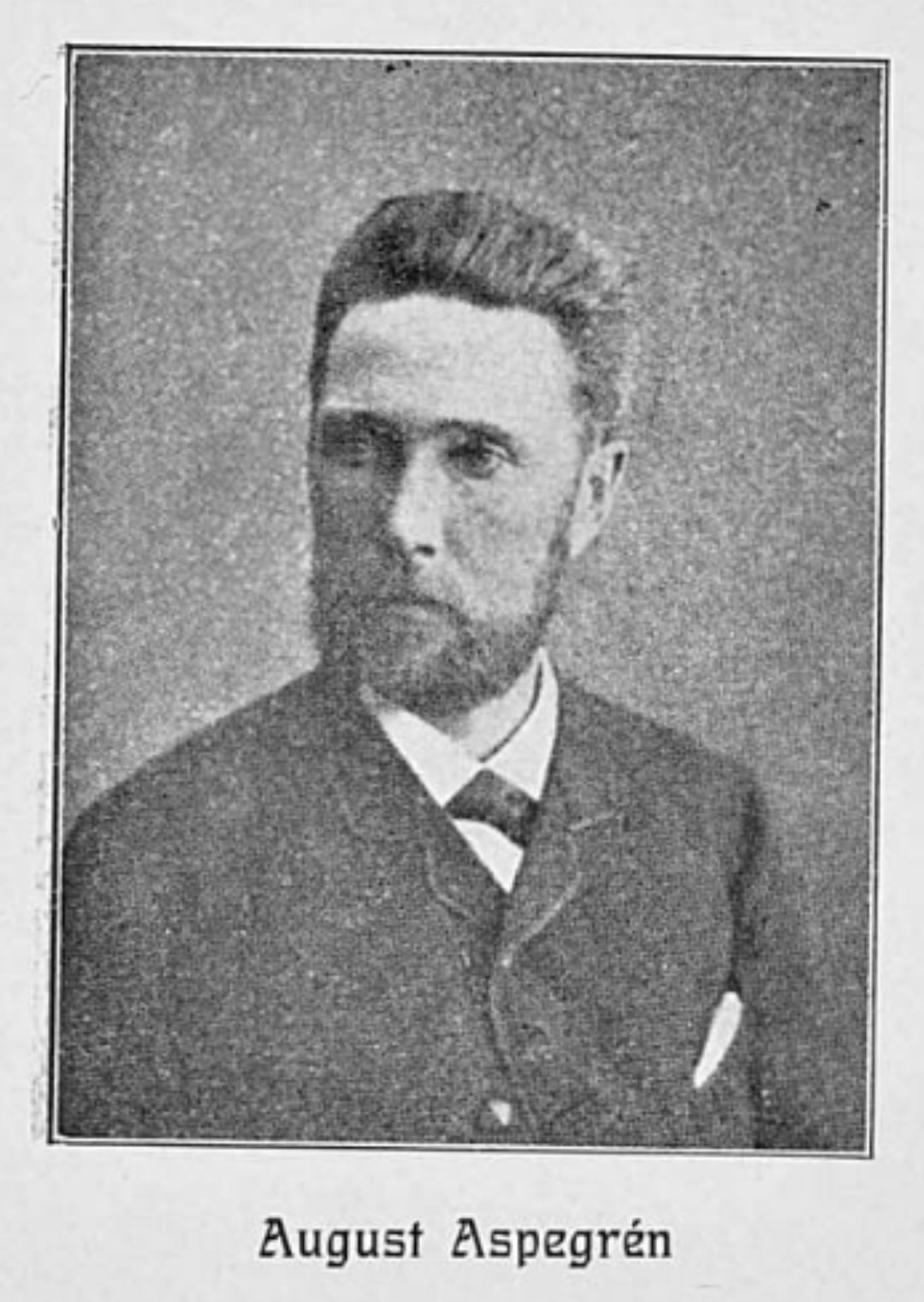
August Aspegren

He was a member of the travelling theater of the Swedish-Finnish actor August Westermark, the first theater in Finland to perform in the Finnish language as well as in Swedish. When the Finnish National Theatre, the first Finnish language permanent theater, was founded in 1872 under the management of Kaarlo Bergbom and Oskari Vilho, the theater was staffed by the members of the Westermark theater company, including Aspegren and his wife Aurora Aspegren. He was a star of the theater and was especially popular as a comic actor.
