= Aurora Aspegren =

Finnish actress

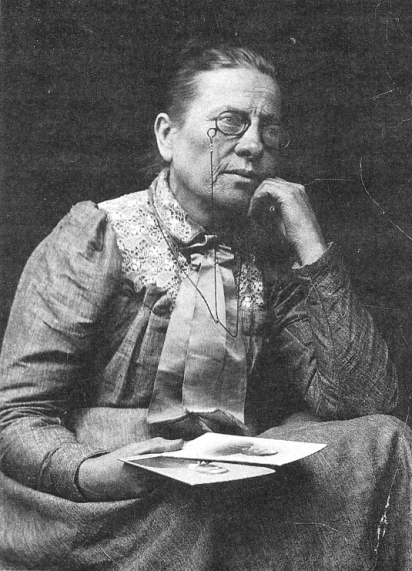
Aurora Aspegren

Maria Aurora Olivia Aspegren (1844–1911) was a Finnish stage actress. She belonged to the elite of the pioneer generation of actors at the Finnish National Theatre.

Aspegren's father was Gustaf Adolf Gullstén (Finnish) and her mother was Swedish-born Birgitta Katarina Södergren. She was a member of the travelling theater of the Swedish-Finnish actor August Westermark, the first theater in Finland to perform in the Finnish language as well as the Swedish. When the Finnish National Theatre, the first Finnish language permanent theater, was founded in 1872 under the management of Kaarlo Bergbom and Oskari Vilho, the theater was staffed by the members of the Westermark theater company, including Aspegren and her spouse August Aspegren. She belonged to the star attractions of the theater and was foremost popular as a tragedienne. She also played an important role in Finnish theater history as an acting instructor.
