= Dennis Byron =

Saint Kitts and Nevis judge

President of the Caribbean Court of Justice
- In office 2011–2018
- Preceded by: Michael de la Bastide
- Succeeded by: Adrian Saunders

Vice-President of the International Criminal Tribunal for Rwanda
- In office 27 May 2011 – 25 August 2011
- Preceded by: Khalida Rachid Khan
- Succeeded by: Vagn Joensen

President of the International Criminal Tribunal for Rwanda
- In office 29 May 2007 – 27 May 2011
- Preceded by: Erik Møse
- Succeeded by: Khalida Rashid Khan

Judge of the International Criminal Tribunal for Rwanda
- In office 23 June 2004 – 21 December 2011
- Preceded by: Lloyd George Williams

Chief Justice of the Eastern Caribbean Supreme Court
- In office 1996–2004
- Preceded by: Vincent Floissac
- Succeeded by: Adrian Saunders

Personal details
- Born: 4 July 1943 (age 83)

Sir Charles Michael Dennis Byron (born 4 July 1943) is a former president of the Caribbean Court of Justice. He also serves as President of the Commonwealth Judicial Education Institute, and is former President of the International Criminal Tribunal for Rwanda (ICTR), and former Chief Justice of the Eastern Caribbean Supreme Court. He was born in Basseterre, Saint Kitts and Nevis.

== Early life and career ==
Byron won the Leeward Islands Scholarship in 1960 and went on to read law at Fitzwilliam College, Cambridge. At Fitzwilliam, he won his oar as a member of the college's top rowing team in the May Bumps for 1964. He graduated with an M.A and LL.B. in 1966. In 1965, he was called to the Bar of England and Wales by the Honourable Society of the Inner Temple.

He distinguished himself in private practice as a Barrister-at-Law and Solicitor throughout the Leeward Islands, with Chambers in Saint Kitts, Nevis and Anguilla from 1966 to 1982.

== Judicial career ==
Sir Dennis Byron's judicial career began in 1982 at the age of 38 when he was appointed as a High Court Judge of the Eastern Caribbean Supreme Court, a federal Court serving six independent countries together with three Crown Colonies of Great Britain. He was soon frequently sitting as a Court of Appeal Judge in an acting capacity before being appointed a substantive member of the Court of Appeal in 1990.

In 1986, as Acting Chief Justice of the Supreme Court of Grenada, on secondment from the Eastern Caribbean Supreme Court, he presided over the famous murder trial involving the assassination of Prime Minister Maurice Bishop – the longest criminal trial in Caribbean history.

As Acting Chief Justice, Judge Byron made the establishment of the Eastern Caribbean Supreme Court Judicial Reform Programme a matter of high priority. In 1997, he launched the Judicial Education Institute as a Committee of the Chief Justice's Office. The Committee produced a Code of Ethics for Judges, and organized a series of seminars and training programmes providing orientation for Judges, lawyers and trial Court Registrars. This Programme was a prelude to the modernisation of practice and procedure in litigation, which was brought to fruition when Chief Justice Byron introduced the new Civil Procedure Rules 2000, which came into operation as of 31 December 2000. These new Rules, tailored to the norms of the Eastern Caribbean, are in keeping with the ethos of judicial case management which informs the Woolf Reforms instituted in England in 1998. Byron was the first Chief Justice to implement the English-modelled Civil Procedure Rules in the Caribbean region. With these reforms, he set a three-fold objective, namely, the enhancement of public access to the Court by simplifying procedures, the reduction of the delay of litigation from start to finish, and the inculcation of a higher standard of professionalism at the Bar.

He is the chair of the Commonwealth Judicial Education Institute (CJEI) in Halifax, Canada, since 2000. The CJEI delivers judicial education programmes and provides support for the implementation of judicial education in countries around the world.

In 2000, he was knighted by Queen Elizabeth II. He was appointed a member of Her Majesty's Most Honourable Privy Council in 2004, making him only the second national of St. Kitts and Nevis to be appointed, following the appointment of the country's first Prime Minister, Dr Kennedy Simmonds, in 1984. Also in 2004, he was appointed as an Honorary Bencher of the Honourable Society of the Inner Temple.

At the invitation of then-Secretary General of the United Nations Kofi Annan, Judge Byron, while serving as Chief Justice of the Eastern Caribbean Supreme Court, from which position he retired, became a permanent Judge of the United Nations International Criminal Tribunal for Rwanda (ICTR) in 2004. The ICTR was established by the United Nations Security Council to try war crimes committed during the Rwandan genocide of nearly 1 million people in 1994. Sir Dennis was elected President of the Tribunal in May 2007 and re-elected for a second term in May 2009. He was elected and re-elected President by his fellow Judges.

As President of the ICTR which is located in Arusha, Tanzania, Sir Dennis was also an Under-Secretary General of the United Nations. He was responsible for the overall management of that International Tribunal and for liaising with Member States as well as the Security Council. He oversaw the implementation of ICTR strategic policies and the management of its external relations. He provided the dedicated leadership and commitment for the realization of the Tribunal's overall Completion Strategy without sacrificing any of the vital safeguards of due process and fair trial rights. He regularly addressed the Security Council of the United Nations in New York City to deliver six-monthly Reports on behalf of the Tribunal in his capacity as president on the progress of the Security Council's Completion Strategy.

Byron sat on seven trial benches and served on a number of pre-trial benches while at the Tribunal. He presides over the multi-accused Karemera, et al. trial, also known as Government I, involving Édouard Karemera, former Minister of the Interior of Rwanda, and Matthieu Ngirumpatse, former President of the MRND.

In 2010, Byron was made an Honorary Fellow by his alma mater, Fitzwilliam College of Cambridge University.

In an interview with Radio Netherlands Worldwide, Sir Dennis Byron highlighted two judgments of the ICTR as trend-setting in international law. He spoke of the case of Akayesu, which was the first case at the international level to interpret genocide in the light of the Genocide Convention and is recognized as an authority in International Criminal Law on sexual violence in conflict situations. As a result of this precedent, rape is now a crime of genocide.

In mid-March 2011, it was announced that Byron was appointed as the new President of the Caribbean Court of Justice (CCJ) during the recent Caribbean Community (CARICOM) Heads of Government Inter-Sessional Summit in Grenada. This appointment followed a unanimous recommendation by the Regional and Judicial Legal Services Commission.

He ended his tenure of four years as President of the International Criminal Tribunal for Rwanda in May 2011 and was sworn in as President of the Caribbean Court of Justice in his home country of Saint Kitts and Nevis on 1 September 2011. He officially retired as President on 4 July 2018.

In 2016, he led the establishment of the Caribbean Agency for Justice Solutions (CAJS), a non-profit, regional development agency dedicated to providing innovative, technology-enabled, cost-effective solutions to the Caribbean's justice sector. CAJS has implemented its various solutions in multiple Caribbean jurisdictions including The Bahamas, Barbados, Belize, Cayman Islands, Grenada, Jamaica, Saint Lucia, Saint Kitts and Nevis, Saint Vincent and the Grenadines, and Trinidad and Tobago, contributing to the advancement of justice delivery in the Caribbean.

As President, he also oversaw the strategic planning initiatives of the CCJ, and introduced several measures to enhance the efficiency of the case management processes. He led the revision of both the Rules of Court and the Judges' Code of Ethics. He is also credited with rendering the internal operations of the Regional Judicial and Legal Services Commission (RJLSC) more efficient and productive.

== Post-retirement activities ==
Since retirement from the bench, Sir Dennis Byron continues to be a speaker and presenter around the world. He is regularly invited to speak on a wide range of topics including the rule of law, the use of technology to enhance access to justice, alternative dispute resolution, judicial training and legal ethics. He is also in demand as an arbitrator. He is the Patron of the Caribbean Branch of the Chartered Institute of Arbitrators as well as an Honorary Fellow of that Institute.

Sir Dennis Byron was appointed to serve as a Member of the Constitutional Review Commission of the British Virgin Islands in 2022. The purpose of the Commission is to conduct a full review of the Virgin Islands Constitution Order, 2007, to re-evaluate the vision of the people of the Virgin Islands as expressed in the preamble of the Constitution Order, 2007, and to propose amendments to the Constitution, where necessary, to facilitate the people of the Virgin Islands in achieving its vision.

He recently served as the Electoral Review Commissioner of Dominica. In this capacity he participated in several public consultations throughout Dominica to listen to and collate the concerns of all stakeholders, and he then provided comprehensive recommendations to be made to enhance, strengthen and modernise the electoral process. He also proposed draft legislation which would bring the electoral reform recommendations into effect.

In 2023, he chaired the CCJ Accession Committee of Saint Lucia which led a public education initiative to raise awareness among citizens of Saint Lucia about the Caribbean Court of Justice and in particular, its appellate jurisdiction. Saint Lucia acceded to the appellate jurisdiction of the CCJ in 2023.

== Personal life ==
Dennis Byron is the son of the late Vincent F. Byron Sr., M.B.E., former senior civil servant who served as warden of Anguilla and who on occasion acted as Governor-General's Deputy to former Governor-General Sir Clement Arrindell, Q.C., Sir Dennis's uncle-in-law. Vincent F. Byron Sr. and his wife, Pearl Byron (née O'Loughlin), both died in 1998.

Sir Dennis Byron's sister, Helen Marcella Byron-Baker, was a former senior property manager at Durst Fetner, one of the largest property developers in New York. His younger brothers are Vincent F. Byron Jr., former Attorney General of St. Kitts and Nevis (2015-2022) and Terence Byron, CMG, the first St. Kitts and Nevis Ambassador (1983-1995) to the Republic of China on Taiwan and South Korea. Both brothers carry on Byron & Byron, the law practice of which Sir Dennis Byron was a founding member.

Sir Dennis Byron is married to Lady Norma Byron, and together they have six children.
