= Khalida Rashid Khan =

Pakistani judge

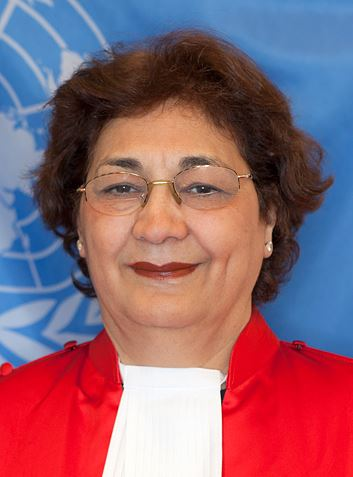

President of the International Criminal Tribunal for Rwanda
- In office 27 May 2011 – 14 February 2012
- Preceded by: Dennis Byron
- Succeeded by: Vagn Joensen

Vice-President of the International Criminal Tribunal for Rwanda
- In office 29 May 2007 – 27 May 2011
- Preceded by: Arlette Ramaroson
- Succeeded by: Dennis Byron

Judge of the International Criminal Tribunal for Rwanda
- In office 7 July 2003 – 21 December 2015
- Succeeded by: Position abolished

Personal details
- Born: 25 September 1949 (age 76) Peshawar, Pakistan
- Education: Peshawar University (LLB, MA)

Khalida Rashid Khan is a retired Pakistani judge who became the first female judge in the Superior Judiciary of Pakistan. She also served as the president of the International Criminal Tribunal for Rwanda.

== Early life ==
She was born on 25 September 1949 in Peshawar, Pakistan. She obtained an LL.B. degree from Khyber Law College, Peshawar in 1969 and a Masters in Political Science degree from Peshawar University in 1971.

== Career ==
In 1974, she was inducted into the judiciary of North West Frontier Province as a Civil Judge. She then became a Senior Civil Judge, District and Sessions Judge and was eventually elevated as a judge of Peshawar High Court in June 1994. She had also held many administrative positions, such as Registrar Peshawar High Court and Secretarial positions in the Justice and Law Department, NWFP.

She is a member of the International Association of Women Judges, U.S. and attended many international conferences. She contributed a paper to the Asia/South Pacific Regional Judicial Colloquium in Hong Kong on 20 May 1996, under the heading "Women and Human Rights in the Asia/Pacific Region, A perspective from South Asia". She presented a paper on "Judicial Creativity in Action" in Dublin, Ireland at the 6th Biennial Conference of International Association of Women Judges in May 2002. She has extensively worked to eradicate child labour in Pakistan and South Asia.

=== International Criminal Tribunal for Rwanda ===
Judge Rashid Khan was appointed as permanent judge of the International Criminal Tribunal for Rwanda (ICTR) in 2003. She served as president of the tribunal from 2011 until 2012, when she was assigned to the appeals chamber in The Hague.
