= Florence Rita Arrey =

Cameroonian judge

Judge of the Constitutional Council of Cameroon
- Incumbent
- Assumed office 7 February 2018
- Appointed by: Paul Biya

Judge of the International Residual Mechanism for Criminal Tribunals
- Incumbent
- Assumed office 1 July 2012

Vice-President of the International Criminal Tribunal for Rwanda
- In office 14 February 2012 – 30 June 2012
- Preceded by: Vagn Joensen
- Succeeded by: Position abolished

Judge of the International Criminal Tribunal for Rwanda
- In office 27 October 2003 – 30 June 2012

Judge of the Supreme Court of Cameroon
- In office 2000–2003

President of the Court of Appeal in Buea
- In office 1994–2000

President of the Court of Appeal in Bamenda
- In office 1990–1994

Judge of the High Court of Cameroon
- In office 1974–1990

Personal details
- Born: May 18, 1948 (age 78) Cameroon
- Education: University of Lagos; University of London
- Occupation: Judge
- Known for: First female President of the Court of Appeal in Buea

Florence Rita Arrey (born 1948) is a Cameroonian judge who was the first female President of the Court of the Appeal in Buea. She has served on the Supreme Court of Cameroon and as Vice-President of the International Criminal Tribunal for Rwanda. In 2014, she was appointed director of judicial professions in the Cameroonian Ministry of Justice.

== Early life and education ==
Arrey was born in Cameroon on 18 May 1948. She studied law at the University of Lagos, Nigeria and has a Diploma in Legal Drafting and a Certificate in International Law from the University of London.

== Career ==
Arrey was the first woman to be appointed State Counsel in Cameroon in 1974. She became President of the Court of Appeal in Bamenda in 1990 and the first female President of the Court of Appeal in Buea in 1994. In 2000, she was appointed to the Supreme Court of Cameroon.

Arrey was elected an ad litem judge of the International Criminal Tribunal for Rwanda (ICTR) by the United Nations General Assembly in 2003. In 2012, she was elected vice president of the ICTR and judge of the Mechanism for International Criminal Tribunals.

In 2014, Arrey was appointed director of judicial professions in the Ministry of Justice Cameroon. She is president and founder of the Cameroon Association of Women Judges and vice president of the International Association of Women Judges.

On International Women's Day in 2011, Arrey was named one of Cameroon's 50 most influential women.

== Works ==
- Arrey, Florence Rita (2000). "Legislative and Judicial Treatment of Family Relations in Cameroon". In United Nations. Division for the Advancement of Women (ed.). Bringing International Human Rights Law Home: Judicial Colloquium on the Domestic Application of the Convention on the Elimination of All Forms of Discrimination Against Women and the Convention on the Rights of the Child. United Nations Publications. pp. 138–140. ISBN 9789211302042.
