= Lloyd George Williams =

Jamaican judge

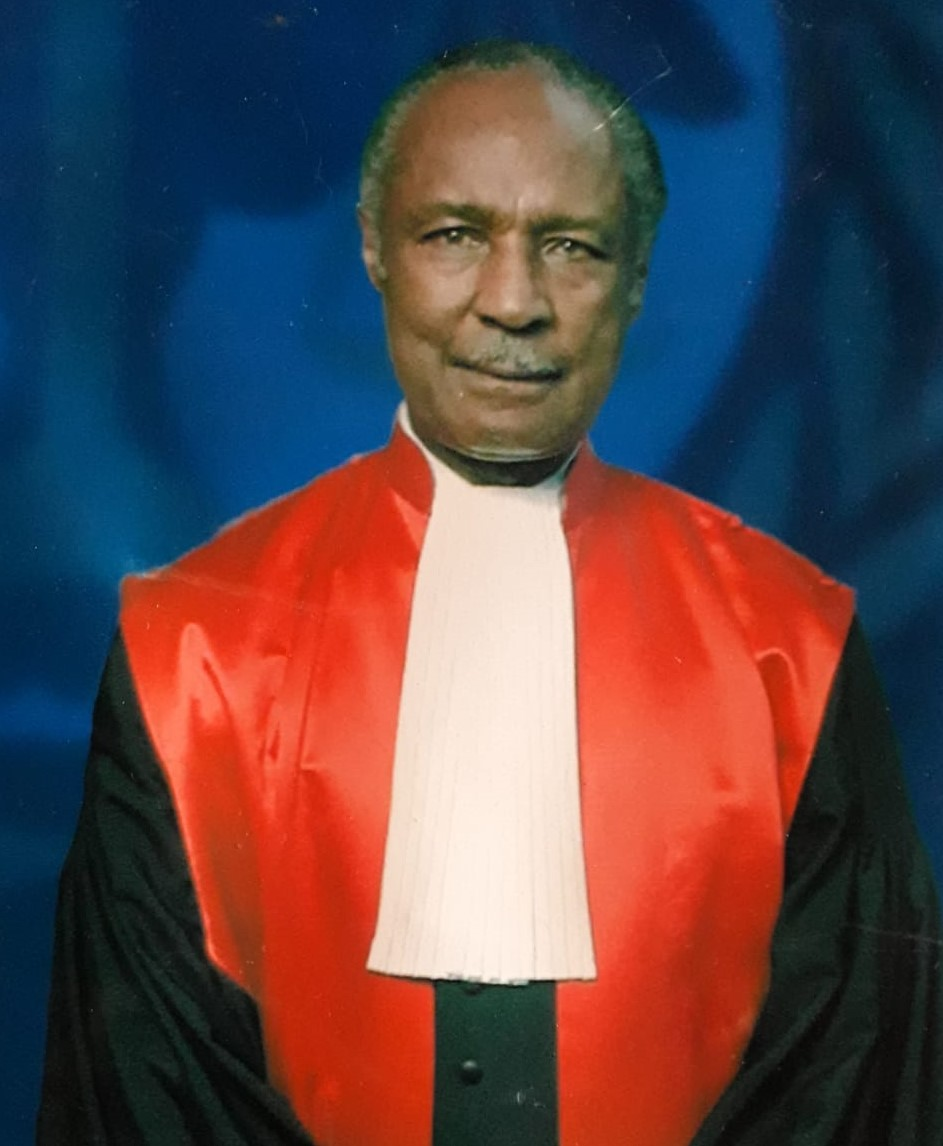

Judge of the International Criminal Tribunal for Rwanda
- In office 22 February 1999 – 31 March 2004
- Succeeded by: Dennis Byron

High Court Judge of the Eastern Caribbean Supreme Court
- In office 1983–1992

Personal details
- Born: 16 June 1927
- Died: 16 January 2008 (aged 80)
- Spouses: Korah Williams (m. 1957; div. 1974) Cynthia Alethea Williams (m. 1983)
- Children: Tonya Williams
- Education: Fisk University; McGill University

Justice Lloyd G. Williams Q.C. (June 16, 1927—January 16, 2008) was a barrister in Jamaica, then a High Court Judge of the Eastern Caribbean Supreme Court and later a Judge of the International Criminal Tribunal for Rwanda from 1999 to 2004 in Tanzania. He is also the father of actress Tonya Williams.

== Personal life ==
Williams, Lloyd George was born on June 16, 1927, in Kingston, Jamaica. Son of Stanford Albert and Gwendolyn Estenia (Grant) Williams. He was married to Korah Williams June 13, 1957, divorced 1974. They had a daughter born July 12, 1958, named Tonya Williams. In 1983, Williams remarried Cynthia Alethea Williams.

== Career ==
He began his career as a Barrister-at-Law in 1959 in England and later entered private practice in Jamaica before becoming Director of Public Prosecutions in Antigua from 1978 to 1982 and Solicitor General, Antigua in 1982. From 1983 to 1992, he was High Court Judge of the Eastern Caribbean Supreme Court. Judge Williams was appointed Queen's Counsel in 1981 by Her Majesty Queen Elizabeth II for distinguished service in the field of law. Judge Williams chaired several Commissions and Statutory Authorities in Jamaica as well as being a member of the Prison Law Reform Committee in Jamaica. Judge Williams was admitted to practice at the English Bar, the Jamaican Bar, the Antiguan Bar and the Cayman Islands Bar.

== Education ==
Williams studied at the Fisk University in Nashville from 1949 to 1950, then at McGill University in Montreal from 1952 and the Inns of Court School of Law at the Middle Temple British law firm from 1954 to 1957. Then in the summer of 1958 he did an in-depth course at the Hague Academy for International Law.
