= Arlette Ramaroson =

Malagasy jurist and scholar (born 1944)

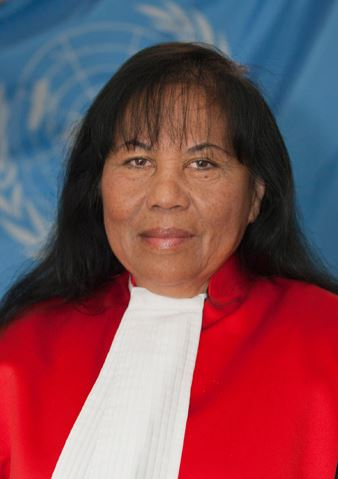
- Arlette Ramaroson in 2014

Vice-President of the International Criminal Tribunal for Rwanda
- In office 21 May 2005 – 29 May 2007
- Preceded by: Andrésia Vaz
- Succeeded by: Khalida Rashid Khan

Judge of the International Criminal Tribunal for Rwanda
- In office 24 April 2001 – 21 December 2015

Personal details
- Born: 14 August 1944 (age 82) Diego-Suarez, French Madagascar
- Occupation: Judge

Arlette Ramaroson (born 14 August 1944) is a Malagasy legal scholar. She was a criminal judge in Antananarivo and subsequently a judge of the International Criminal Tribunal for Rwanda and the International Criminal Tribunal for the former Yugoslavia. She became the first female international judge from Madagascar. She was also the first female presidential candidate of Madagascar.

== Biography ==
Arlette Ramaroson was born on 14 August 1944, in Diego-Suarez, French Madagascar (present-day Antsiranana, Madagascar). She obtained a Bachelor of Laws in 1973 and subsequently a diploma from the Institut d'Etudes Judiciaires in 1974.

Subsequently, she became Deputy Public Prosecutor in her hometown. A year later, she became an investigating judge and judge of the Criminal Court of Appeals in Antananarivo, and served as President of the Criminal Affairs Department there since 1978. Since 1995, she has also taught civil law and criminal law at the University of Antananarivo. From 1998, she served for three years as Director of International Relations at the Ministry of Justice.

In 2001, she was elected a judge of the International Criminal Tribunal for Rwanda in Arusha, Tanzania. She also served as vice-president there from 2005 to 2007. Since 2011, she has been a judge of the Appeals Chamber of this tribunal, together with the International Criminal Tribunal for the former Yugoslavia. In 2018, she became the first female presidential candidate for the 2018 Malagasy presidential election.
