= Vagn Joensen =

Danish judge

Judge of the International Residual Mechanism for Criminal Tribunals
- Incumbent
- Assumed office 1 July 2012

President of the International Criminal Tribunal for Rwanda
- In office 14 February 2012 – 31 December 2015
- Preceded by: Khalida Rachid Khan
- Succeeded by: Position abolished

Vice-President of the International Criminal Tribunal for Rwanda
- In office 26 August 2011 – 14 February 2012
- Preceded by: Dennis Byron
- Succeeded by: Florence Rita Arrey

Judge of the International Criminal Tribunal for Rwanda
- In office 2 May 2007 – 31 December 2015

Judge of the Østre Landsret
- In office 1994–2007

Judge of the City Court of Copenhagen
- In office 1982–1993

Vagn Joensen is a Danish jurist who served as vice-president, president and presiding judge of the United Nations International Criminal Tribunal for Rwanda (ICTR). He is presently a judge at the International Residual Mechanism for Criminal Tribunals, which succeeded the ICTR. Previously, he had been a judge of the Østre Landsret in Copenhagen (the Eastern Division of the Danish High Court) from 1994 to 2007 and of the City Court of Copenhagen from 1982 to 1993.
