= Erik Møse =

Norwegian judge (born 1950)

Justice in the Supreme Court of Norway
- In office 2009 (2018, resumed) – (2011, suspended for ECHR) 2020

Judge at the European Court of Human Rights
- In office 2011–2018

Presiding Judge, Trial Chamber I of the International Criminal Tribunal for Rwanda
- In office 2007–2009

President of the International Criminal Tribunal for Rwanda
- In office 26 May 2003 – 29 May 2007
- Preceded by: Navanethem Pillay
- Succeeded by: Charles Michael Dennis Byron

Vice-President of the International Criminal Tribunal for Rwanda
- In office 4 June 1999 – 26 May 2003
- Preceded by: Yakov Ostrovsky
- Succeeded by: Andrésia Vaz

Judge of the International Criminal Tribunal for Rwanda
- In office 31 May 1999 – February 2010

Presiding Judge at Borgarting Court of Appeal
- In office 1993–1999

Personal details
- Born: 9 October 1950, Oslo
- Education: University of Oslo; Honorary Doctor, University of Essex; M.S., Geneva Graduate Institute
- Awards: Royal Norwegian Order of Merit, Commander; University of Oslo Human Rights Award

Erik Møse (born 9 October 1950) is a Norwegian judge. Møse was a judge at the International Criminal Tribunal for Rwanda (ICTR), Supreme Court of Norway, and the European Court of Human Rights (ECHR). At the ICTR, he served as Vice President and later President. As of 2025, having retired from his judicial career, he is serving as Chair of the Independent International Commission of Inquiry on Ukraine.

== Education and early career ==
Møse graduated from the University of Oslo and had post-graduate studies at the Graduate Institute of International Studies in Geneva. Beginning in 1981, he taught at the University of Oslo. He then became a Fellow at the University of Essex in England and subsequently an Honorary Doctor.

== Human rights expert ==
Møse has published extensively in the field of human rights. He led the committee that published the Norwegian Official Report 1993:18 on human rights.

Møse was head of department in the Norwegian Ministry of Justice and the Police until 1986; deputy judge, Supreme Court advocate at the Solicitor General's Office from 1986 to 1993; and presiding judge at Borgarting Court of Appeal in Oslo from 1993 to 1999.

Møse became Vice President of the International Criminal Tribunal for Rwanda (ICTR) in 1999, then President in 2003, succeeding Navanethem Pillay.

Møse was President of the ICTR from 2003 to 2007. As of 2009, he was the Presiding Judge in Trial Chamber I of the ICTR.

In 2008 he was named as a Supreme Court Justice of Norway. In 2011 he was elected judge at the European Court of Human Rights. He resumed his Supreme Court chair in 2018.

== Personal life ==
Møse is married and has two children, who both attended Kilimanjaro and Arusha Campuses of International School Moshi.
