= Adrian Saunders =

Judge from Saint Vincent and the Grenadines

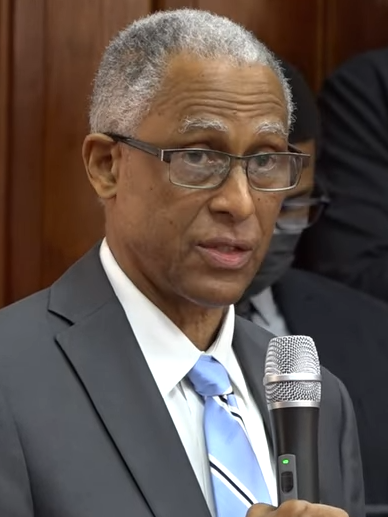
- Saunders in 2022

President of the Caribbean Court of Justice
- In office 2018–2025
- Preceded by: Dennis Byron
- Succeeded by: Winston Charles Anderson

Judge of the Caribbean Court of Justice
- In office 2005–2025

Acting Chief Justice of the Eastern Caribbean Supreme Court
- In office 2004–2005
- Preceded by: Charles Michael Dennis Byron
- Succeeded by: Brian George Keith Alleyne

Justice of Appeal of the Eastern Caribbean Supreme Court
- In office 2003–2005

Personal details
- Born: 4 January 1954 (age 72)

Adrian Dudley Saunders (born 4 January 1954) is a judge from Saint Vincent and the Grenadines. He was a judge of the Caribbean Court of Justice from 2005 to 2025, serving as its president from 2018 to 2025.

== Biography ==
Saunders was born in Saint Vincent. He earned his LLB degree with honours from the University of the West Indies at Cave Hill in 1975.

In 1996, Saunders was appointed a judge of the Eastern Caribbean Supreme Court (ECSC). He became a High Court Judge in 1997 and from 1997 to 2001 served as a judge in Montserrat and Anguilla. In 2001, he began serving as a judge in Saint Lucia.

In 2003, Saunders became a Justice of Appeal of the ECSC and in 2004 he became the acting Chief Justice of the ECSC, succeeding Dennis Byron. As Chief Justice, he was the supreme judicial officer of the courts of Anguilla, Antigua and Barbuda, the British Virgin Islands, Dominica, Grenada, Montserrat, Saint Kitts and Nevis, Saint Lucia, and Saint Vincent and the Grenadines. In 2005, he was appointed as a judge of the Caribbean Court of Justice and stepped down from the ECSC.

In 2009, Mr. Justice Saunders became the Chairman of the Caribbean Association of Judicial Officers, a position which he continues to hold. In April 2018, he was appointed to the Advisory Board of the Global Judicial Integrity Network by the United Nations Office on Drugs and Crime’s (UNODC) Global Programme for the Implementation of the Doha Declaration.

In July 2018, he was sworn in as the third President of the Caribbean Court of Justice, by Patrick Allen, Governor General of Jamaica, at the Montego Bay Convention Centre.
