= International Criminal Tribunal for Rwanda =

1994 court of the United Nations Security Council

Coordinates: 3.3677°S 36.6965°E

International Criminal Tribunal for Rwanda (ICTR)
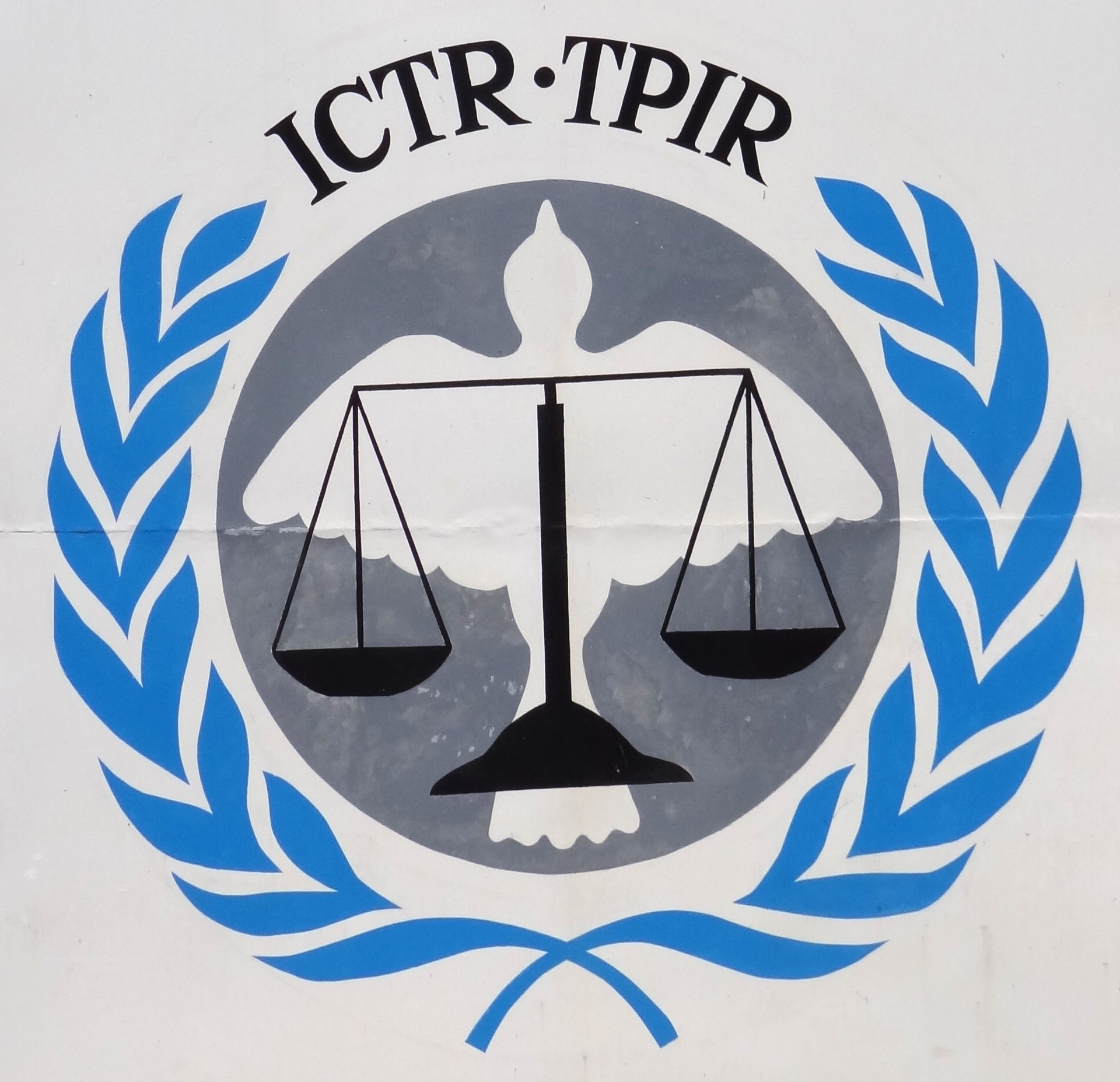
- Interactive map of International Criminal Tribunal for Rwanda (ICTR)
- Established: 8 November 1994
- Dissolved: 31 December 2015
- Jurisdiction: Rwanda
- Location: Arusha, Tanzania
- Authorised by: United Nations Security Council Resolution 955
- Number of positions: 16 permanent 9 ad litem
- Website: unictr.irmct.org

President

The International Criminal Tribunal for Rwanda (Note: Full name: International Tribunal for the Prosecution of Persons Responsible for Genocide and Other Serious Violations of International Humanitarian Law Committed in the Territory of Rwanda and Rwandan Citizens Responsible for Genocide and Other Such Violations Committed in the Territory of Neighbouring States, between 1 January 1994 and 31 December 1994) (ICTR; French: Tribunal pénal international pour le Rwanda; Kinyarwanda: Urukiko Mpanabyaha Mpuzamahanga Rwashyiriweho u Rwanda) was an international ad-hoc court established in November 1994 by the United Nations Security Council in Resolution 955 in order to adjudicate people charged for the Rwandan genocide and other serious violations of international law in Rwanda, or by Rwandan citizens in nearby states, between 1 January and 31 December 1994. The court eventually convicted 61 individuals and acquitted 14. In 1995, it became located in Arusha, Tanzania, under Resolution 977. From 2006, Arusha also became the location of the African Court on Human and Peoples' Rights. In 1998 the operation of the tribunal was expanded in Resolution 1165. Through several resolutions, the Security Council called on the tribunal to complete its investigations by end of 2004, complete all trial activities by end of 2008, and complete all work in 2012. The tribunal had jurisdiction over genocide, crimes against humanity, and violations of Common Article Three and Additional Protocol II of the Geneva Conventions (which deals with internal conflicts).

The first trial, of Jean-Paul Akayesu, began in 1997. Jean Kambanda, interim Prime Minister, pleaded guilty. According to the ICTR's Completion Strategy, in accordance with Security Council Resolution 1503, all first-instance cases were to have completed trial by the end of 2008 (this date was later extended to the end of 2009) and all work was to be completed by 2010. As of 2009, the tribunal had finished 50 trials and convicted 29 accused persons, and another 11 trials were in progress and 14 individuals were awaiting trial in detention; but the prosecutor intended to transfer 5 to national jurisdiction for trial. 13 others were still at large, some suspected to be dead. The United Nations Security Council called upon the tribunal to finish its work by 31 December 2014 to prepare for its closure and transfer of its responsibilities to the International Residual Mechanism for Criminal Tribunals (IRMCT or Mechanism) which had begun functioning for the ICTR branch on 1 July 2012. The Tribunal was officially closed on 31 December 2015.

The tribunal's failure to prosecute war crimes committed by the Rwandan Patriotic Front or try RPF leader Paul Kagame was widely criticized, to the point of being characterized as "victor's justice".

== Genocide against Tutsi ==
The Rwandan genocide refers to the mass slaughter of more than 800,000 ethnic Tutsi and politically moderate Hutu by government-directed gangs of Hutu extremist soldiers and police in Rwanda. The duration of the 1994 genocide is usually described as 100 days, beginning on April 6 and ending in mid-July.

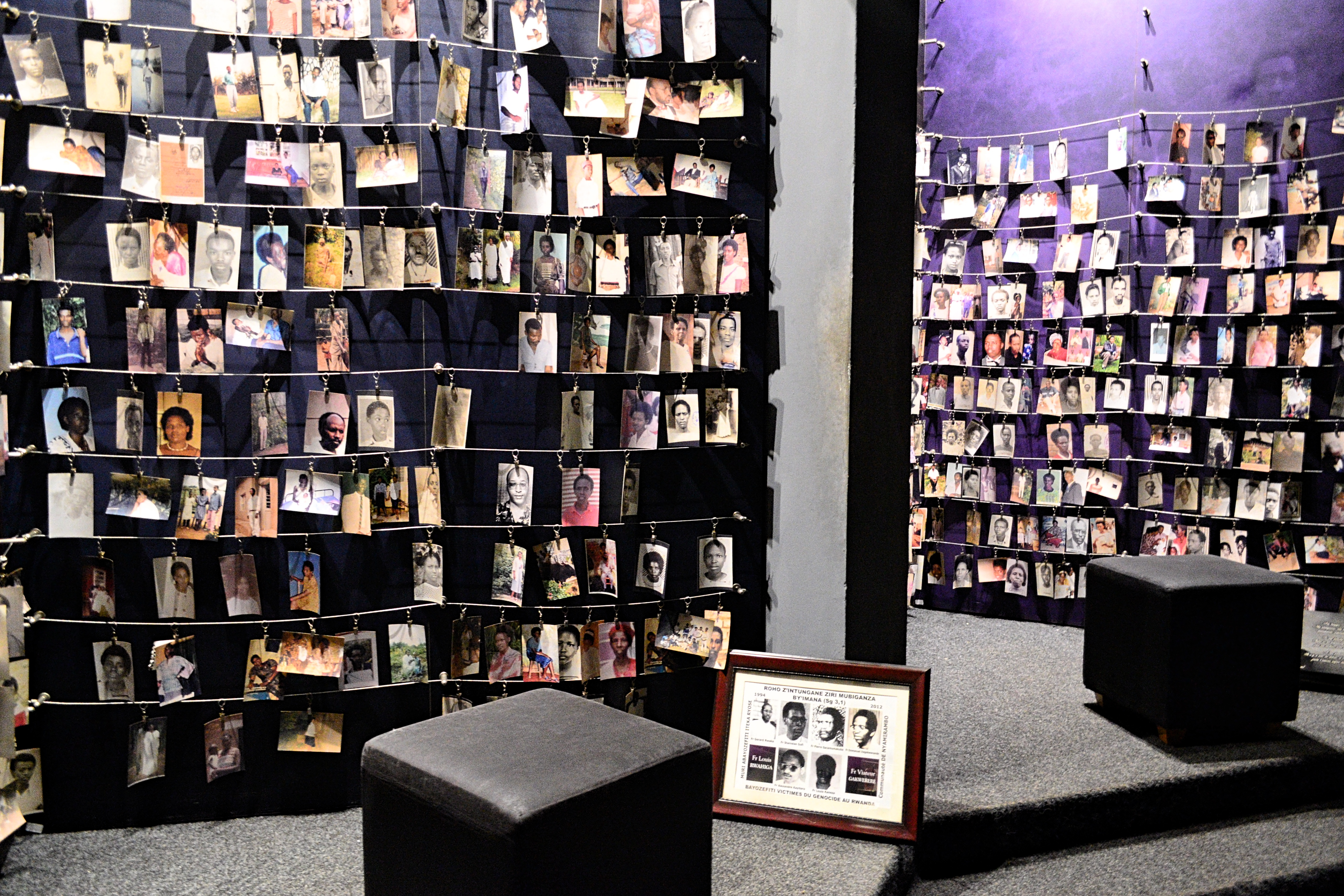
Photographs of genocide victims displayed at the Genocide Memorial Center in Kigali

The tension between the majority Hutu and the minority Tutsi had developed over time but was particularly emphasized late in the nineteenth century and early in the twentieth century as a result of German and Belgian colonialism over Rwanda. The ethnic categorization of the two was an imposed and an arbitrary construct based more on physical characteristics than ethnic background. However, the social differences between the Hutu and the Tutsi have traditionally allowed the Tutsi, with a strong pastoralist tradition, to gain social, economic, and political ascendancy over the Hutu, who were primarily agriculturalists. The distinction under colonial powers allowed Tutsis to establish ruling power until a Hutu revolution in 1959 abolished the Tutsi monarchy by 1961.

The hostility between the two groups continued, as "additional rounds of ethnic tension and violence flared periodically and led to mass killings of Tutsi in Rwanda, such as in 1963, 1967, and 1973". The establishment of the Rwandan Patriotic Front (RPF) and its invasion from Uganda furthered ethnic hatred. A ceasefire in these hostilities led to negotiations between the government and the RPF in 1992.

On April 6, 1994, a plane carrying then-President Juvenal Habyarimana, and Cyprien Ntaryamira of Burundi was shot down, killing everyone on board. The Hutu held the RPF accountable and immediately began the genocide, targeted at both Tutsis and Hutu moderates.

Most of the killing during the Rwandan genocide was carried out by the radical Hutu groups known as the Interahamwe and the Impuzamugambi. Radio broadcasts also were an integral part of the genocide, which further fueled the genocide by encouraging Hutu civilians to kill their Tutsi neighbours, labeled as "cockroaches" in need of extermination. Despite its colossal scale, particularly within such a short period of time, the genocide was carried out almost entirely by hand, usually with the utilization of machetes and clubs. Various atrocities committed include the rape of thousands of Tutsi women, as well as the dismemberment and disfigurement of victims. Frequently the killers were people the victims knew personally—neighbors, workmates, former friends, sometimes even relatives through marriage. At least 500,000 Tutsis were killed, and approximately 2 million refugees (mostly Hutus) left for refugee camps of neighboring Burundi, Tanzania, Uganda, and former Zaire.

== Establishment of the ICTR ==
The United Nations Assistance Mission for Rwanda is regarded as a major failure. The international response to the Rwandan genocide was poor. For weeks, the major power nations denied that a genocide was taking place in Rwanda. The United States refused to call the incident genocide because using the term would make an obligation for the United States to send troops, which it was reluctant to do after several of its soldiers were killed during a humanitarian mission in Somalia the previous year. Finally in July 1994, after the genocide was over, the UN Security Council called for an investigation of the events, and acted to establish an international criminal tribunal to prosecute those individuals most responsible for the genocide. Adopting Resolution 955, the Security Council created the ICTR on 8 November 1994 and the ICTR would also deal with other crimes against international humanitarian law committed on the territory of Rwanda and neighboring states between 1 January 1994 and 31 December 1994.

== ICTR structure ==
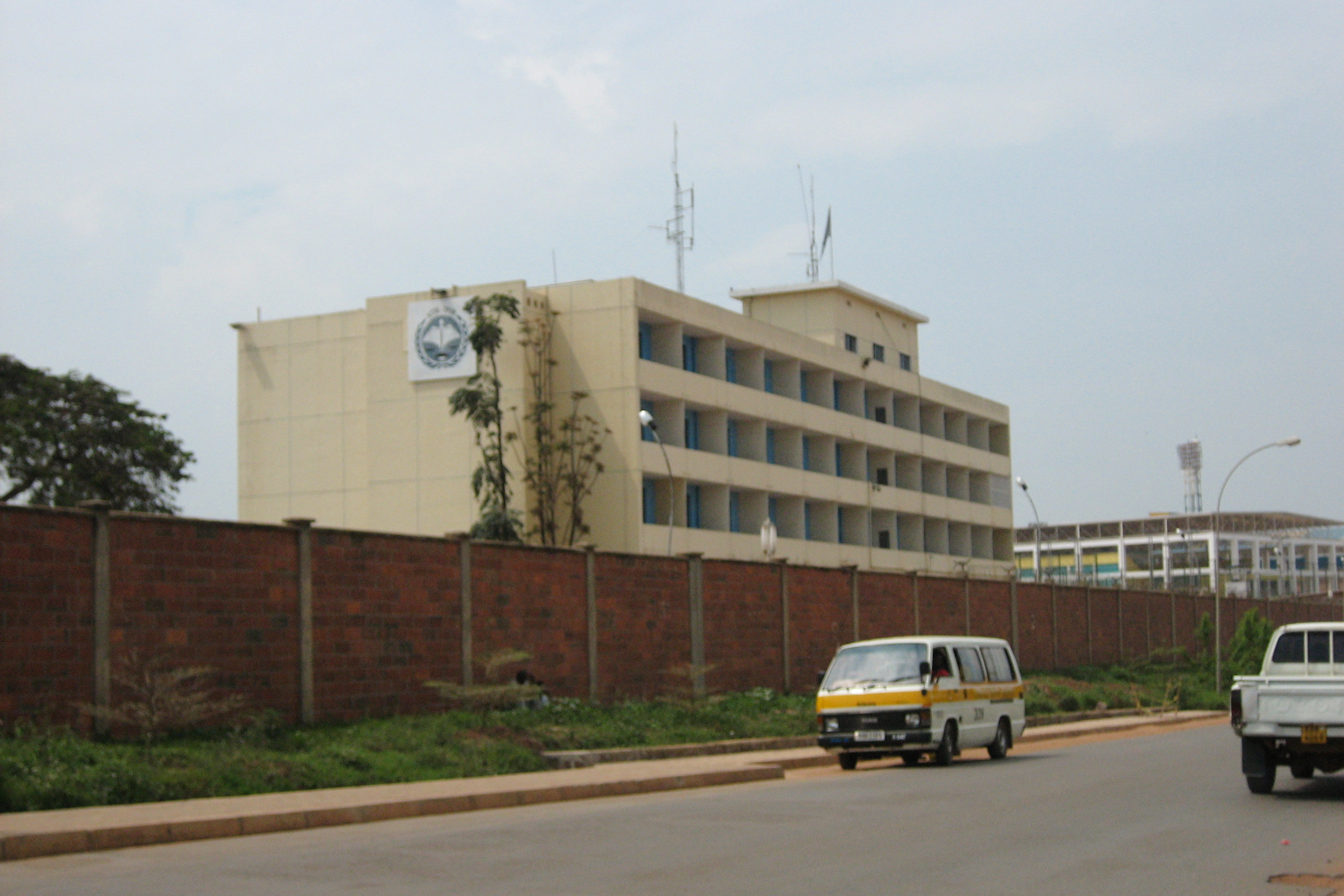
An ICTR building in Kigali, Rwanda.

=== Chambers ===
The Tribunal had four "chambers" – three to hear trials, and one to hear appeals. There were 16 permanent judges, seven of whom where members of the Appeals Chamber. In addition, the General Assembly elected a pool of 18 ad litem judges, from which the Secretary-General could appoint judges, at the request of the Tribunal’s President, to serve in the Trial Chambers in one or more trials. No more than nine ad litem judges could serve in the Tribunal at any one time.

==== Presidents ====
All ICTR Presidents were elected in plenary session by their fellow judges. The ICTR statute stipulated that the Tribunal's President must be a permanent judge and a member of a Trial Chamber (Article 13, par. 1 and 2). However, United Nations Security Council Resolution 1995 made ad litem judges eligible for election as President.

Name	State	Tenure	References
Vagn Joensen	Denmark	2012–2015	
Khalida Rachid Khan	Pakistan	2011–2012	
Dennis Byron	Saint Kitts and Nevis	2007–2011	
Erik Møse	Norway	2003–2007	
Navi Pillay	South Africa	1999–2003	
Laïty Kama	Senegal	1995–1999	

==== Vice-Presidents ====
The ICTR’s statute did not establish a vice-presidency, but Article 14 provided for the judges to adopt Rules of Procedure and Evidence. Rule 20 established a vice-presidency with two-year terms, with at most one reelection.

Name	State	Tenure	References
Florence Rita Arrey	Cameroon	2012–2012	
Vagn Joensen	Denmark	2011–2012	
Dennis Byron	Saint Kitts and Nevis	2011–2011	
Khalida Rachid Khan	Pakistan	2007–2011	
Arlette Ramaroson	Madagascar	2005–2007	
Andrésia Vaz	Senegal	2003–2005	
Erik Møse	Norway	1999–2003	
Yakov Ostrovsky	Russia	1995–1999	

==== Trial Chamber I ====
Judge	Country	Status	In Office
Laïty Kama	Senegal	Permanent	1995–1999
Lennart Aspegren	Sweden	Permanent	1995–1999
Navi Pillay	South Africa	Permanent	1995–2003
Asoka de Zoysa Gunawardana	Sri Lanka	Permanent	1999–2001
Erik Møse	Norway	Permanent	1999–2009
Mparany Rajohnson	Madagascar	Ad litem judge	2009–2013

==== Trial Chamber II ====
Judge	Country	Status	In Office
Laïty Kama	Senegal	Permanent	1999–2001
William Sekule	Tanzania	Permanent	1999–2015
Mehmet Güney	Turkey	Permanent	1999–2001
Andrésia Vaz	Senegal	Permanent	2001
Solomy Balungi Bossa	Uganda	Ad litem judge	
Lee Gacugia Muthoga	Kenya	Ad litem judge	
Seon Ki Park	South Korea	Ad litem judge	

==== Trial Chamber III ====
Judge	Country	Status	In Office
Lloyd G. Williams	Jamaica Saint Kitts and Nevis	Permanent	1999–2004
Yakov Ostrovsky	Russia	Permanent	1999–2003
Pavel Dolenc	Slovenia	Permanent	1999–2003
Florence Rita Arrey	Cameroon	Permanent	
Gberdao Gustave Kam	Burkina Faso	Ad litem judge	
Bakhtiyar R.Tuzmukhamedov	Russia	Permanent	
Robert Fremr	Czech Republic	Permanent	
Vagn Joensen	Denmark	Permanent	

==== Appeals Chamber ====
Judge	Country	Status	In Office
Theodor Meron	United States	Presiding judge	
Patrick Robinson	Jamaica	Member	
Fausto Pocar	Italy	Member	
Liu Daqun	China	Member	
Mehmet Güney	Turkey	Member	
Carmel Agius	Malta	Member	
Arlette Ramaroson	Madagascar	Member	
Andrésia Vaz	Senegal	Member	
Khalida Rashid Khan	Pakistan	Member	

=== Office of the Prosecutor ===
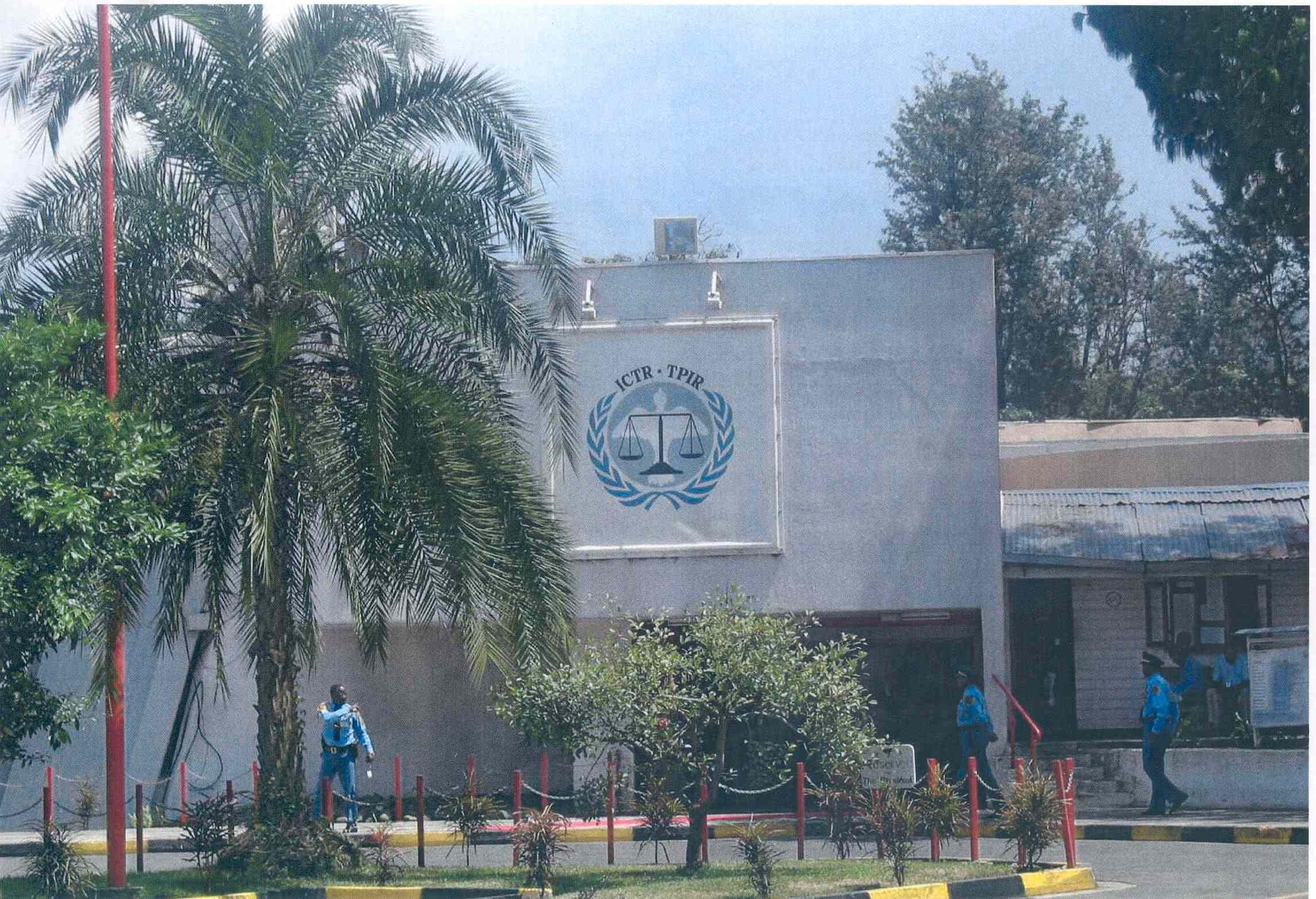
Offices of the International Criminal Tribunal for Rwanda in Arusha, 2003.

The Office of the Prosecutor was divided into various units at the height of its activity, including the Investigations Division and the Prosecution Division:

- The Prosecution Division was responsible for prosecuting all cases before the Tribunal. Headed by a Chief of Prosecutions.
- The Investigations Division was responsible for collecting evidence implicating individuals in crimes committed in Rwanda in 1994. Headed by a Chief of Investigations.

==== Prosecutors ====
Prosecutor	Country	Tenure	UNSC Resolution
Richard Goldstone	South Africa	late 1994 – 30 Sep 1996	Resolution 936
Louise Arbour	Canada	1 Oct 1996 – 15 Sep 1999	Resolution 1047
Carla Del Ponte	Switzerland	5 Sep 1999 – 14 Sep 2003	Resolution 1259
Hassan Bubacar Jallow	The Gambia	15 Sep 2003 – 31 Dec 2015	Resolution 1505

=== The Registry ===
The Registry was responsible for the overall administration and management of the ICTR. It also performed other legal functions assigned to it by the Tribunal's Rules of Procedure and Evidence, and was the Tribunal's channel of communication.

The Registry was headed by the Registrar, who was the Representative of the UN Secretary-General. Bongani Christopher Majola of South Africa was Registrar. after January 2013.

== The Case of Jean-Paul Akayesu ==
After an intense and precisely targeted campaign of a number of international non-governmental organizations, which aimed at raising awareness of gendered violence at the ICTR, the trial of Jean-Paul Akayesu established the legal precedent that genocidal rape falls within the act of genocide. "...the [Trial] Chamber finds that in most cases, the rapes of Tutsi women in Taba, were accompanied with the intent to kill those women. ... In this respect, it appears clearly to the chamber that the acts of rape and sexual violence, as other acts of serious bodily and mental harm committed against the Tutsi, reflected the determination to make Tutsi women suffer and to mutilate them even before killing them, the intent being to destroy the Tutsi group while inflicting acute suffering on its members in the process." Presiding judge Navanethem Pillay said in a statement after the verdict: "From time immemorial, rape has been regarded as spoils of war. Now it will be considered a war crime. We want to send out a strong message that rape is no longer a trophy of war."

== Media Case ==
The trial against "hate media" began on 23 October 2000. It was charged with the prosecution of the media which encouraged the genocide of 1994.

On 19 August 2003, at the tribunal in Arusha, life sentences were requested for Ferdinand Nahimana, and Jean-Bosco Barayagwiza, persons in charge for the Radio Télévision Libre des Mille Collines, as well as Hassan Ngeze, director and editor of the Kangura newspaper. They were charged with genocide, incitement to genocide, and crimes against humanity, before and during the period of the genocides of 1994. On 3 December 2003, the court found all three defendants guilty and sentenced Nahimana and Ngeze to life imprisonment and Barayagwiza to imprisonment for 35 years. On 28 November 2007, the Appeals Chamber partially allowed appeals against conviction from all three men, reducing their sentences to 30 years' imprisonment for Nahimana, 32 years' imprisonment for Barayagwiza and 35 years' imprisonment for Ngeze.

== Related legal activities ==
French investigating magistrate Jean-Louis Bruguière was also pursuing a case against the current President, Paul Kagame, and other members of his administration, for the assassination of his predecessor. This case was under the regular jurisdiction of the French courts because French citizens were also killed in the plane crash. The majority of genocide cases were handled by the so-called gacaca courts, a modernized customary dispute resolution mechanism.

== Indictees ==
The ICTR, which operated between 1994 and 2015, indicted a total of 96 individuals. One individual remains at large as a fugitive and if captured will be tried before the International Residual Mechanism for Criminal Tribunals (the IRMCT). The ICTR (or the IRMCT as its successor) convicted 61 individuals: 24 of whom are currently serving sentences, 22 of whom have completed their sentences, and 15 of whom died while serving their sentences. The Tribunal acquitted 14 individuals and transferred the cases against 10 individuals to national jurisdictions. Proceedings against 10 individuals ended before a final judgment was rendered: two of whom had their charges dismissed by the Tribunal, two of whom had their charges withdrawn by the Prosecutor, and six of whom died.

== Controversies ==
The critique concerning the ICTR can be divided into claims pertaining to its creation, the fairness of its prosecution (who was accused), trial fairness (who was sentenced), the fairness of the procedures (did the parties have equal rights and equal opportunities to bring their evidence and arguments) and the court’s efficiency (how much time and resources did the court use to achieve its aims).

The legal doubts about the UN Security Council having the power to create a court which have been levelled against the ICTY’s creation also apply regarding the ICTR. Like the ICTY, the ICTR had jurisdictional blind spots: because its timely jurisdiction was limited to the year 1994, it could not prosecute later events, such as the violent dissolution of the Kibeho refugee camp or the crimes committed against the civilian population in Zaire (later the Democratic Republic of the Congo) by Hutu militias, the RPA, and Rwandan-backed Congolese rebels. Formally, the territorial jurisdiction extended to Rwanda’s neighbors, but the roles of Uganda and Zaire in the conflict were never investigated by the ICTR. Neither did it investigate failures, shortcomings or possible crimes by politicians from Belgium, France, Germany, Italy, the UK, and the US who were engaged in negotiations with the Rwandan government before the genocide, in the Arusha peace process, and in reactions to the ongoing genocide after April 1994.

Opposite to the ICTY, the ICTR did not have to work in a strongly polarized ethnic environment. After the Rwandan Patriotic Front (RPF) had taken over the power in Rwanda and the Hutu militias (and the majority of the Hutu population) had fled to neighboring countries, the perspective of the victims (the Tutsi inside the country, or “Tutsi de l’interieur”) and the liberators (the Rwandan Patriotic Front, which included Tutsi but also many of the Hutu opponents to president Habyarimana and members of democratic Hutu parties) prevailed and strongly influenced how ICTR staff interpreted the conflict. Attempts by indictees and their lawyers to influence the ICTR were mostly unsuccessful, albeit more belligerent and radical than politically motivated defense strategies at the ICTY. The ICTR was heavily dependent on access to witnesses from Rwanda and the cooperation with the Rwandan government for access to documents because the UN Security Council had established the ICTR’s main seat in Arusha rather than in Rwanda. There also was competition between the Rwandan government and the ICTR Office of the Prosecution over access to suspects in third countries which often led to tensions. According to opinion polls, the Rwandan population was not very impressed by the ICTR’s efforts, because suspects had rather comfortable conditions in Arusha and did not face capital punishment; and because the trials there lasted much longer than the relatively swift and harsh trials Rwanda organized for many of lower ranking perpetrators. Some of the more prominent ones were even publicly executed in Kigali.

A widely shared and very basic bias allegation against the ICTR consists in its failure to investigate and prosecute crimes committed by the Rwandan Patriotic Army, the armed wing of the RPA. In the light of human rights organizations’ reports, the RPA had committed war crimes against the civilian population during its campaign in 1993 and after entering the country at the beginning of the genocide. There had been looting of private property and exactions against villagers but also revenge killings, among them the murder of several high-ranking catholic clerics in Kabgayi in 1994. The latter was subject of a domestic trial against RPA soldiers and officers, while the exactions from 1993 and early 1994 were not investigated. There is also a lasting controversy if the ICTR prosecution should have investigated and tried the assassination of president Habyarimana. The assault on his aircraft was later investigated by the French judiciary and there are several (mutually contradictory) reports about the assassination and its authors (which also included the French crew members as victims giving the French judiciary a legal basis for investigations), blaming either Hutu nationalist radicals who wanted to get rid of the president or the RPF.

For a long time (until the 2010s) neither prosecution nor chambers regarded it as the ICTR’s job to prosecute contempt of court and false testimonies committed by witnesses. Their hesitance created incentives for the creation and expansion of perjurer networks and the creation of false evidence by either people, who wanted to see an accused sentenced (if he or she came from an enemy group) or acquitted (if he or she stemmed from their own ethnic background). Chambers regarded the prosecution of false testimony in court as being outside their core mandate and made contradictory decisions about who should prevent false testimony (the prosecution or the chambers) and how. Instead of initiating sanctions against perjurers, judges were eager to “explain false testimony away” as examples of cultural exceptions or trauma.

ICTR publications usually measure efficiency in terms of the part of indicted persons who were put on trial. From that perspective, the ICTR was quite efficient, because it managed to get hold on all the persons for which it had issued arrest warrants. But alike the ICTY, the ICTR did not indict all people which it was tasked and empower to prosecute, because some of the Interahamwe leaders obtained the status of protected witnesses and a new identity (Cruvellier). Félicien Kabuga, a wealthy businessman from the Habyarimana era, who is widely believed to have financed the Interahamwe and provided them with machetes from China, managed to stay in hiding until his arrest in Paris in 2020. His trial started, but later was first interrupted and then terminated due to his dementia and inability to stand trial.

ICTR trials used to be very long and cumbersome. In some cases (André Rwamakuba), the trial chamber struck down the indictment after the prosecution had rested its case, because there was literally no case to answer to for the defense. But at that time, the accused had already spent years in custody for which they were (due to the UN’s immunity) not eligible for any compensation. In another, the Office of the Prosecutor first summoned the former head of the Gendarmerie, Augustin Ndindiliyimana (who had fled to Belgium) as a witness and, when he refused to testify for the prosecution, indicted him. Ndindiliyimana was first found guilty and sentenced to exactly the same prison term that he had spent in pre-trial arrest and then exonerated and set free by the appeals chamber. For years he lived with other acquitted suspects in a safe house in Tanzania, because the ICTR was unable to find a country that would issue him a long-term visa.

Bachmann and Fatić have argued that due to its dependence on Rwanda, the ICTR became a part of the Rwandan justice system, with the Rwandan government steering tribunal decisions almost at will, by either holding back evidence or channeling materials from survivor organizations into judicial procedures. According to Del Ponte, the Rwandan military intelligence eavesdropped on the prosecution to retrieve information about secret investigations concerning RPA-crimes. After pressure from Rwanda, the UK and the US, Del Ponte lost her position at the ICTR but was allowed to remain ICTY chief prosecutor. The Office of the Prosecutor never returned to the investigation concerning the downing of Habyarimana’s Falcon and the secret investigations.

== See also ==
- Anees Ahmed
- Command responsibility
- Genocide Convention
- Rwandan genocide
- International Criminal Court
- International Criminal Tribunal for Yugoslavia
- Joint criminal enterprise
- Rule of Law in Armed Conflicts Project (RULAC)
- The Church and the Rwandan genocide
- Global Justice or Global Revenge? by Hans Köchler
- Yvonne Ntacyobatabara Basebya
