= Yvonne Ntacyobatabara Basebya =

Dutch-Rwandan criminal (1947–2016)

- Born: 8 February 1947
- Died: 24 February 2016 (aged 69)
- Known for: Incitement to genocide in Rwandan genocide of 1994

Yvonne Ntacyobatabara Basebya (born Yvonne Ntacyobatabara on 8 February 1947 in Ruhengeri province; died on 24 February 2016 in Reuver) was a Rwandan-Dutch woman who was the first Dutch citizen to be convicted of incitement to genocide, in relation to the Rwandan genocide of 1994.

== Biography ==
She was married to Augustin Basebya, a parliamentarian and politician who was involved with the extremist Hutu party Coalition pour la Défense de la République (CDR). She was a member of or at least closely linked to the National Republican Movement for Democracy and Development (Mouvement Républicain National pour la Démocratie et le Development, MRND), whose youth wing was involved in the Rwandan genocide.

She moved to the Netherlands in 1998 and became a Dutch citizen in 2004. She was convicted in absentia by a gacaca court in Rwanda.

Basebya was arrested on 22 June 2010 on suspicion of involvement in the 1994 genocide in Rwanda after an investigation by the Dutch International Crimes Unit. She was the second person arrested in the Netherlands for genocide after John Mpambara. She faced eighteen months of pre-trial detention. She was charged with abetting genocide, attempted genocide, murder, conspiracy to genocide, incitement to genocide, and war crimes.

She was tried in The Hague by the Hague District Court. There was not enough evidence to support a charge of war crimes, but her continued and public singing of the song "Tubatsembatsembe," which called for the murder of all Tutsis, and her material support for those who committed genocide was evidence of intentional incitement to genocide. On 1 March 2013 she was convicted of incitement (instigation) to genocide and sentenced to six years and eight months' imprisonment, the maximum sentence at that time under the Dutch War Crimes Act.

The case was important for establishing a precedent for incitement to genocide in both Dutch and international jurisprudence, particularly for the relationship of national courts and universal jurisdiction.
