= Laïty Kama =

Senegalese judge and first president of the ICTR

Judge Laïty Kama

President of the International Criminal Tribunal for Rwanda
- In office 27 June 1995 – 4 June 1999
- Preceded by: Position established
- Succeeded by: Navi Pillay

Judge of the International Criminal Tribunal for Rwanda
- In office 25 May 1995 – 6 May 2001

Personal details
- Born: 22 November 1939 Dakar, Senegal
- Died: 6 May 2001 (aged 61) Aga Khan Hospital in Nairobi, Kenya
- Occupation: Judge
- Profession: Barrister, Judge

Laïty Kama (22 November 1939 in Dakar – 6 May 2001), was a Senegalese lawyer of Serer heritage and the first president of the International Criminal Tribunal for Rwanda (ICTR). He was one of the longest serving judges of the ICTR.

== Legal career ==
Kama's major career started in 1969 when he became a Magistrate in Senegal, and an Examining Judge in Diourbel (Senegal) from 1969 to 1973. He was then appointed Deputy Public Prosecutor from 1973 to 1974 and Public Prosecutor in Thiès from 1974 to 1978.

He served as Assistant Public Prosecutor at Dakar's Court of Appeal and the Assize Court for 15 years.

In 1992, Kama was appointed First Assistant Public Prosecutor at the Supreme Court of Appeal.

In May 1995, he was appointed judge of the United Nations' International Criminal Tribunal for Rwanda. He was also the First President of the ICTR. Kama remained a judge of the Court until May 2001

=== Lecturer and organization established ===
Kama taught at École nationale de la Magistrature du Sénégal in Dakar for 20 years, an organization he co-founded.

=== Legacy ===
As an expert on International Criminal Law, Kama represented Africa in the Working Group on Arbitrary Detention which was established by the United Nations Commission on Human Rights. In this post, he presided over the drafting sessions of Benin's new code of Criminal Prosedure. Since his membership of the Senegalese delegation to the United Nations Commission of Human Rights in Geneva from 1983 to 1990, he actively participated in the negotiations of the Convention against torture, inhuman, or degrading treatment or punishment. In 1991, he conducted seminars on human right violations and the administration of justice at Kigali (in Rwanda). Similar seminars were conducted at Bujumbura (in Burundi) in 1993.

== Death ==
In mid-April 2001, Kama fell ill and was hospitalized in Nairobi (Kenya) where he was reported to have "received treatment for respiratory and heart problems". He died on 6 May 2001. On his death, The United Nations' flag was flown at half-mast outside the International Criminal Tribunal for Rwanda (ICTR). The ICTR Chief of Press and Information Tom Kennedy described his death as a "sad loss."
