= Oskari Vilho =

Finnish stage actor

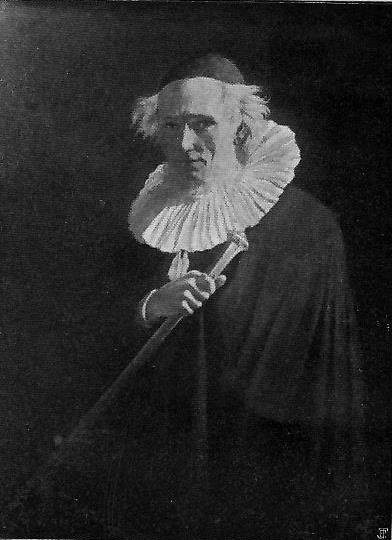
Oskari Vilho

Oskari Vilho (1840–1883), was a Finnish stage actor. He was a founder of the first Finnish language theater in Finland, the Finnish National Theatre, in which he was an actor as well as Kaarlo Bergbom's co-director when the company was founded in 1872.
