= Emilie Bergbom =

Finnish theatre director

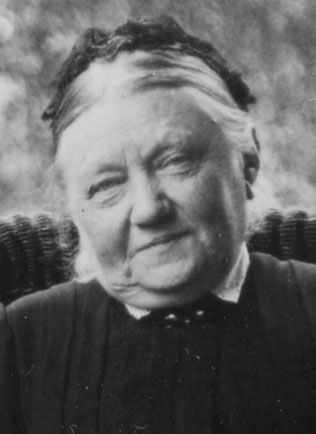
Emelie Bergbom

Emilie Sofia Bergbom (1834−1905) was a Finnish theater director. She was a supporter of the Fennoman movement.

She was joint director of the Finnish National Theatre with her brother Kaarlo Bergbom from its foundation in 1872 until her death in 1905. Bergbom was also director of a credit bank, making her the first of her sex in Finland to have an official position.

== Sources ==
- Helmi Krohn: Emilie Bergbom – elämä ja työ. (K. F. Puromiehen kirjapaino O.-Y., 272 s.). Helsinki: Kustannusosakeyhtiö Otava, 1917.
