= Lennart Aspegren =

Swedish judge (1931–2026)

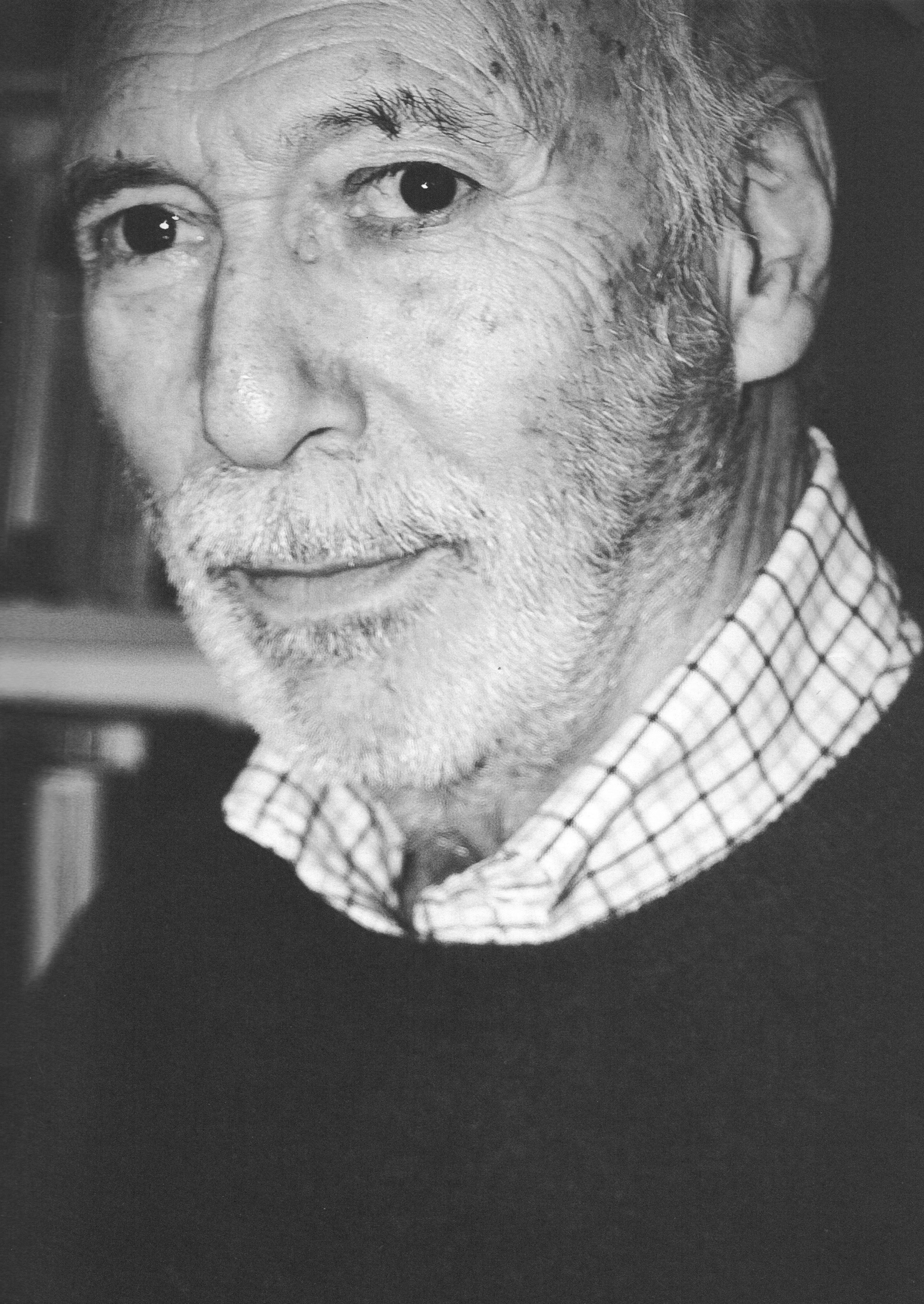

Judge of the International Criminal Tribunal for Rwanda
- In office 19 June 1996 – 27 January 2000

Personal details
- Born: 23 July 1931
- Died: 21 May 2026 (aged 94)
- Spouse: Berit Soldén-Aspegren (m. 1958)

Lennart Aspegren (23 July 1931 – 21 May 2026) was a Swedish judge who served on the International Criminal Tribunal for Rwanda (ICTR). He was one of three judges who ruled that rape fell within the legal definition of genocide and crimes against humanity in the case The Prosecutor v. Jean-Paul Akayesu involving Jean-Paul Akayesu. Akeyesu was the first genocide trial in history: "Not even Eichmann in Israel, who was accused of having committed crimes against humanity, was charged with genocide". While serving on the Tribunal he worked with Navi Pillay who later became the UN High Commissioner for Human Rights. In 2011, Aspegren accepted a position with the UN Expert Committee for Gaza; together with American judge Mary Davis, Aspergen prepared a report colloquially called the "Davis/Aspegren Report". It was presented by the UN Human Rights Council’s Committee in 2011; the United States and Israel voted against it. Aspegren died on 21 May 2026, at the age of 94.
