= Ossian Wuorenheimo =

Finnish politician

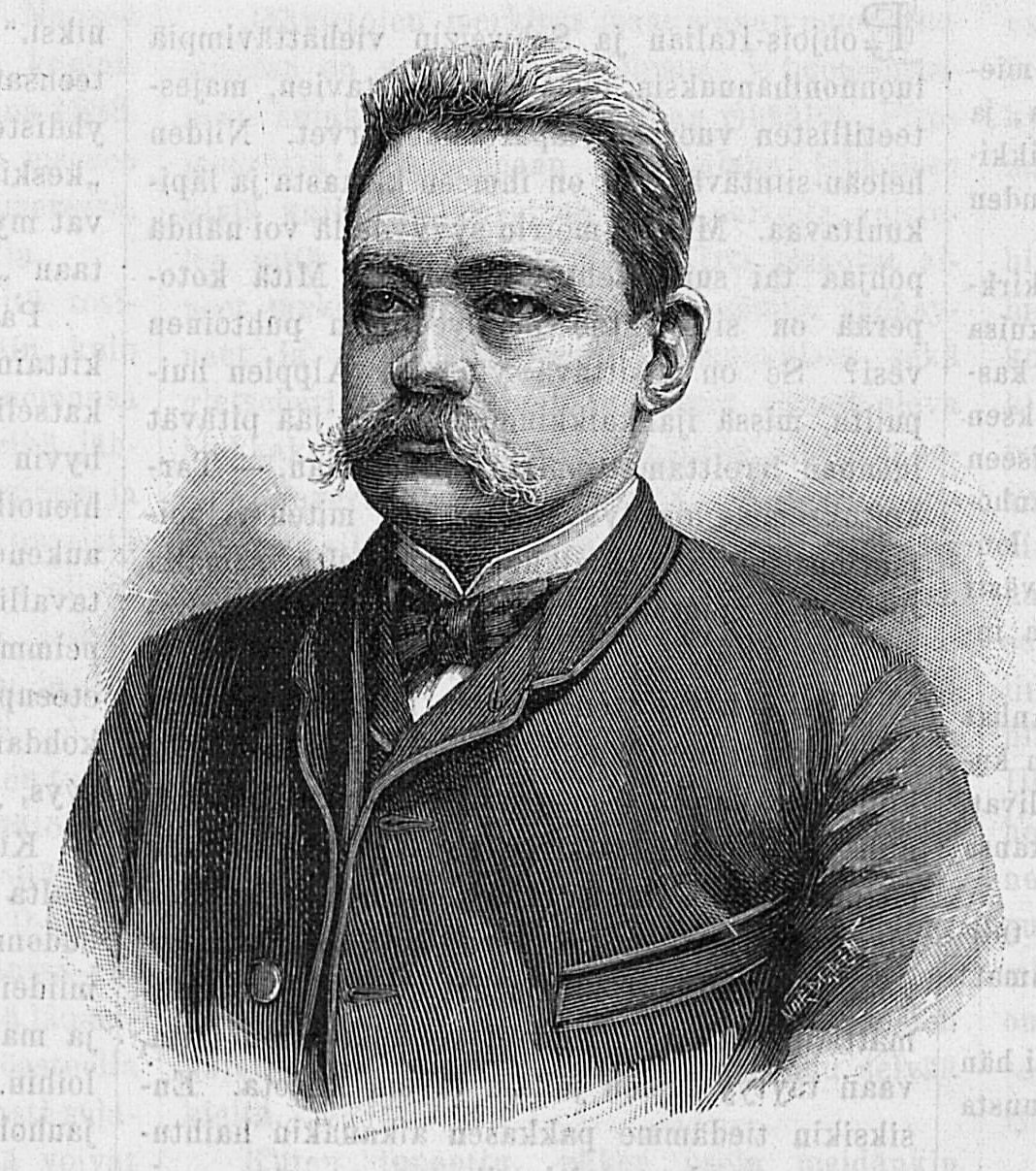

Ossian Wuorenheimo (until 1906 Bergbom) (3 December 1845, Viborg – 13 June 1917, Helsinki) was a Finnish politician. He was a member of the Senate of Finland.

== Family ==
Wuorenheimo's parents were Senator Johan Erik Bergbom and Fredrika Juliana Rochier. His siblings were Kaarlo and Emilia Bergbom, known as the founders of the National Theatre, and Augusta af Hörlin, an activist. Wuorenheimo's first wife from 1877 was Augusta Fredrika Theresa Rotkirch (1857-1881) and his second from 1884 was Agnes Augusta Charlotte Idman (1864-1921). They had three children. His son from his second marriage was Aarne Vuorenheimo, a missionary counselor and executive director of Suomi-Film. The writer Toivo Tarvas was the adopted son of Osian Wuorenheimo. Wuorenheimo's father-in-law, Gustav Fredrik Rotkirch, and his two sons-in-law, Samuel Werner von Troil and Gustav Samuel von Troil, were senators.
