= Navi Pillay =

South African lawyer and judge (born 1941)

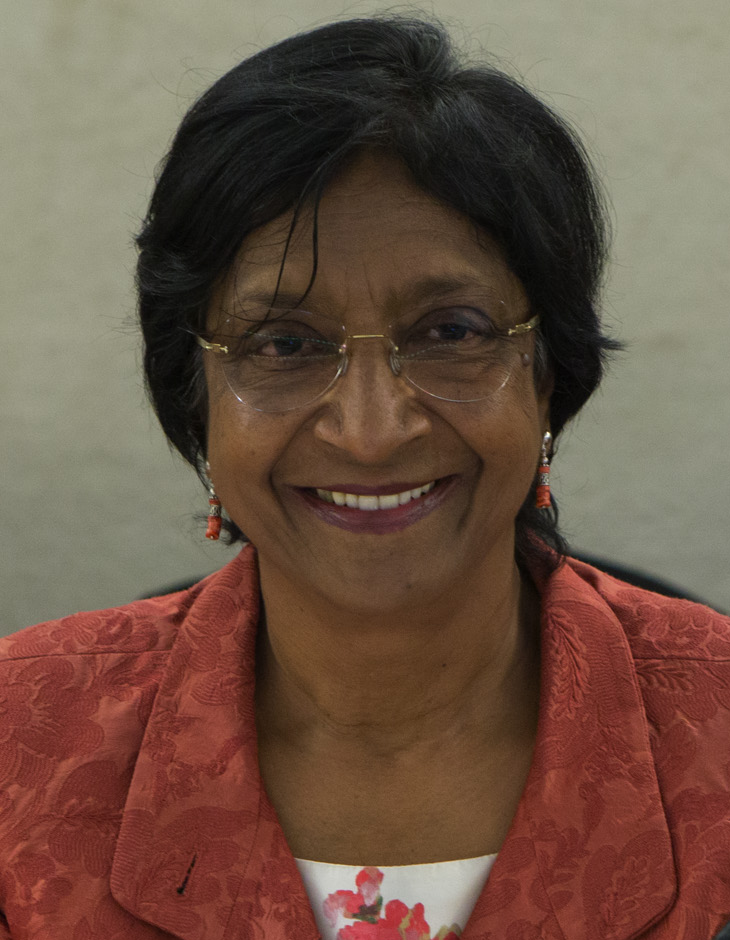
- Pillay in 2014

United Nations High Commissioner for Human Rights
- In office 1 September 2008 – 31 August 2014
- Secretary General: Ban Ki-moon
- Deputy: Kang Kyung-wha; Flavia Pansieri
- Preceded by: Louise Arbour
- Succeeded by: Zeid bin Ra'ad

Judge of the International Criminal Court
- In office 11 March 2003 – 31 August 2008

President of the International Criminal Tribunal for Rwanda
- In office 4 June 1999 – 26 May 2003
- Preceded by: Laïty Kama
- Succeeded by: Erik Møse

Judge of the International Criminal Tribunal for Rwanda
- In office 25 May 1995 – 3 December 2003

Judge of the High Court of South Africa
- In office 1995–1995
- Appointed by: Nelson Mandela

Personal details
- Born: Navanetham Pillay; 23 September 1941 (age 85) Durban, Natal, South Africa
- Spouse: Gaby Pillay (m. 1965)
- Children: 2
- Education: University of Natal (BA, LLB); Harvard University (LLM, JSD)
- Awards: Nobel Peace Prize (2026)

Navanetham "Navi" Pillay (born 23 September 1941) is a South African jurist who served as the high commissioner for human rights of the United Nations from 2008 to 2014. Pillay was the first non-white female judge of the High Court of South Africa. She has also served as a judge of the International Criminal Court and president of the International Criminal Tribunal for Rwanda. She is to be awarded the 2026 Nobel Peace Prize for her efforts to promote peace and international law.

Pillay was born and raised in Durban, to a family of Indian Tamil origin, where she later attended the University of Natal, receiving her Bachelor of Arts in 1963 and her Bachelor of Laws in 1965. After university, Pillay pursued a career as an attorney, joining the legal defence against apartheid. In 1967, Pillay started her own law firm and became the first woman to do so in her home province of Natal. In 1981, Pillay attended Harvard University and earned her Master of Law. In 1988, she completed her thesis and graduated from Harvard Law School with a Doctorate of Juridical Science.

Pillay was nominated and confirmed to the High Court of South Africa by the Judicial Service Commission under supervision of the bar association in 1995. In 1995, President Nelson Mandela and Justice Minister Dullah Omar nominated Pillay to the UN Security Council for a judgeship on the International Criminal Tribunal for Rwanda (ICTR). Between 1999 and 2003, Pillay served on the ICTR, and was elected President Judge. In 2003, the Assembly of States Parties to the Rome Statute of the International Criminal Court (ICC) elected her as a judge in the ICC, where she served as member of the Appeals Chamber until 2008. In 2008, with the approval of the United Nations General Assembly, Secretary-General Ban Ki-moon appointed Pillay the UN high commissioner for human rights.

She was also the chair of the UN Independent International Commission of Inquiry on the Occupied Palestinian Territory. Pillay has been serving as an ad hoc judge on the International Court of Justice's Rohingya genocide case (The Gambia v. Myanmar) for crimes of genocide since 2019.

== Early life and education ==
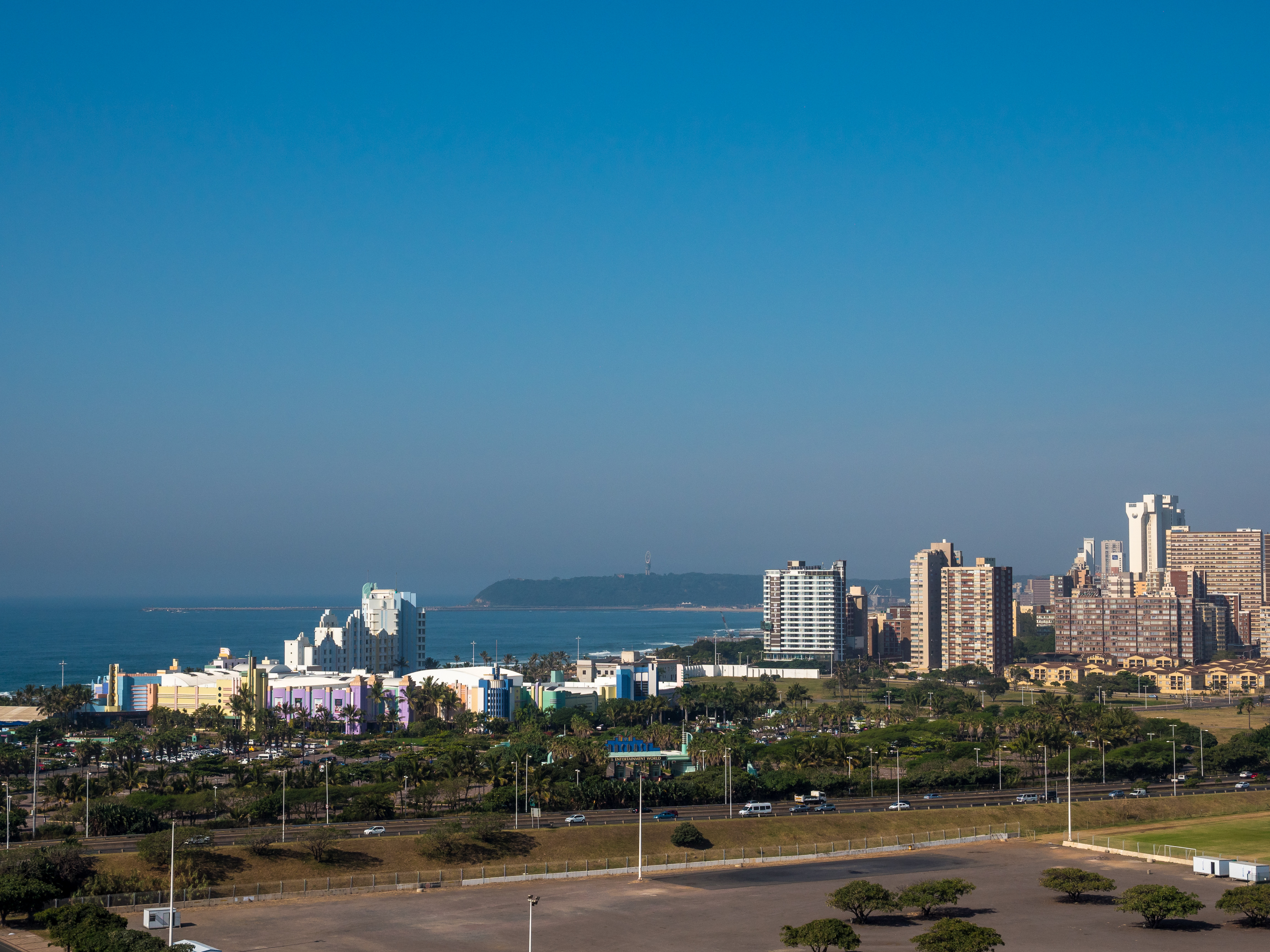
Durban, South Africa, hometown of Navi Pillay

Pillay was born Navanethem Naidoo on 23 September 1941 in Durban, Province of Natal, Union of South Africa, to Narrainsamy and Santhama Naidoo. She is of Indian Tamil origin. Her grandparents came from Batlagundu, India as indentured servants to work on South African sugar plantations in Natal in the 1890s, and her grandfather lost both arms in a workplace accident at the sugar mill. Her parents had an arranged marriage during their early teens and had eight children, the fifth being Pillay. Narrainsamy was a bus driver and took up other jobs such as fishing to supplement their income, while Santhama was a homemaker. The two raised their family with strong Hindu values, emphasising equality between the men and women in the family.

Pillay was raised in Clairwood, a poor and predominantly Indian suburb of Durban. While most of Pillay's classmates during elementary school were married off, her parents insisted she and her two other sisters attend school like their brothers. At the time, there were more children in South Africa than there were places in schools. Insistent on ensuring education for all her children, Pillay's mother would wait in long admission lines, using the birth certificates of her older children to get her younger children into school. She attended Clairwood High School, and was later patron of the alumni society of the school. With limited money for school supplies, Santhama Pillay would stitch together notebooks for her younger children, using blank pages from the used notebooks of her elder children.

In school, Pillay experienced an environment completely different from her home life, learning a new religion in a new language. Despite their personal beliefs, teachers were strictly prohibited from addressing politics, including apartheid, out of fear that the school administration would retaliate.

Pillay had her first encounter with the law when she was five years old and testified in court after being robbed of 5 South African Pounds. Her mother had given her the money to give to her father, these were his wages for the month. The thief was convicted, but the court did not return the money to her father.

Pillay received many accolades for her writing during her early childhood. When she was 10 years old, Pillay wrote an in-class essay on how black individuals received heavier sentences than their white counterparts in South African courts using information she had overheard from her parents and teachers, since she could not access radios or newspapers. At age 14, Pillay submitted an essay on why South Africans should buy South African-made commerce to a competition held by the Durban Chamber of Commerce, and received a bronze medal for her work. At 15, Pillay published an essay on the role of women in instilling values in children, which earned her an award of books from the Jewish Women's Union.

Supported by donations from the local Indian community, she graduated from the University of Natal with a BA in 1963 and an LLB in 1965. She was sponsored by the citizens of Clairwood, the Durban City Council, and a scholarship from the university. During her years at the University of Natal, the campus was extremely politically active. Most classes and graduations were segregated which infuriated many students on campus. Under apartheid, Pillay was forced to share what limited resources they were given amongst all non-white students at the university. She once had to share a required textbook in a non-white library with 20 of her other non-white classmates. In 1959, South Africa passed the Separate Universities Act which forced previously de-segregated universities to re-segregate. As a result, Pillay was forced to transfer to the nearest non-white university, the University College for Indians at Salisbury Island, after her first year of university. While the University of Natal offered an LLB program, University at Salisbury Island did not. She filed for an exemption with Minister of Justice, calling the office directly after receiving no response and was then able to return to Natal, where she could finish her degree.

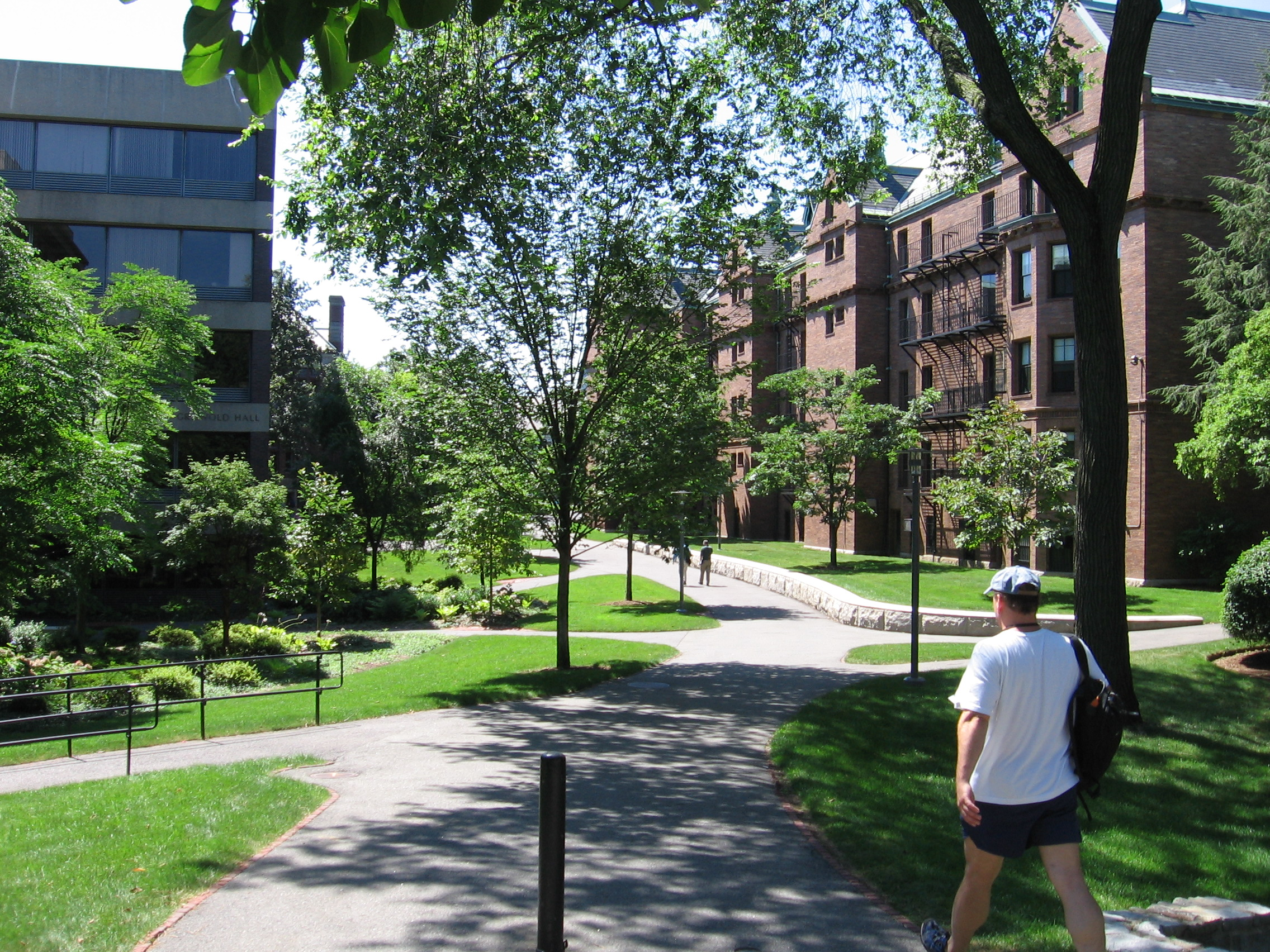
Pillay's alma mater, Harvard Law School

She later attended Harvard Law School under the foreign exchange Harvard–South Africa Scholarship Program, earning an LLM in 1982 and a Doctor of Juridical Science degree after completing her thesis in 1988. Pillay was the first South African to obtain a doctorate in law from Harvard Law School.

== Legal career in South Africa ==
Pillay has spent much of her legal career advocating for the preservation of international human rights law, with a special focus on crimes regarding rape and sexual violence. She was very involved in the anti-apartheid movement, defending political opponents of apartheid in their cases against the state for poor prison conditions and the use of torture.

=== Shadow work ===
After graduating from the University of Natal, Pillay had the choice of becoming an advocate or an attorney. Pillay chose to pursue a legal career as an attorney, which required two years of service as an attorney before becoming an admitted attorney. She did her articles under N. T. Naicker, a banned member of the African National Congress. Naicker was often under house arrest and had to rely on Pillay to testify for his clients in court.

In 1967, Pillay became one of three women admitted as attorneys, and the first non-white woman to open her own law practice in the province of Natal. She says she had no other alternative: "No law firm would employ me because they said they could not have white employees taking instructions from a coloured person". As a non-white lawyer under the apartheid regime, she was not allowed to enter a judge's chambers.

=== Private practice ===
During her 28 years as a lawyer in South Africa, she defended anti-Apartheid activists of the African National Congress, the Unity Movement, the Black Consciousness Movement (notably leaders Saths Cooper and Strini Moodley), and Azapo. She also helped expose the use of torture and poor conditions of political detainees. When her husband was detained in 1971 under the Terrorism Act, she successfully sued to prevent the police from using unlawful methods of interrogation against him. In 1973, she won the right for political prisoners on Robben Island, including Nelson Mandela, to have access to lawyers in State v Kader Hassim and 9 others and State v Harry Gwala and 9 others. While providing legal counsel, her clients recommended she consult judges with expertise in international law and humanitarian law on their cases.

Pillay then applied to and attended Harvard University in 1981 under the foreign exchange Harvard-South Africa Scholarship Program and earned her Master of Law. The Harvard-South Africa Scholarship Program was a foreign exchange program created by anti-apartheid activists on Harvard's campus. They demanded that if the university were to continue to invest in companies that did business with South Africa under apartheid that they offer opportunities for South African students to study at Harvard. After completing her thesis, she graduated from Harvard Law School with a Doctorate of Jurisprudence in 1988, the first South African to receive the law school s most advanced law degree.

During this time, she also co-founded the Advice Desk for Abused Women, among other activities.

=== High Court of South Africa ===
In 1995, the year after the African National Congress came to power, Pillay was nominated and confirmed to the High Court of South Africa by President Nelson Mandela and the Judicial Service Commission under supervision of the bar association, becoming the first non-white woman to serve on the court.

The Judicial Service Commission is a group of jurists hand picked by the President of South Africa to screen incoming candidates on the High Court of South Africa and compile the list of nominees. Pillay's connection with Nelson Mandela during their work against apartheid made her a familiar name to Mandela during his presidency, putting her on the short-list for the nomination to the court. Shortly after her appointment, President Mandela called Pillay to personally congratulate her on her judgeship, stating "your appointment gives me great personal joy". She noted that "the first time I entered a judge's chambers was when I entered my own."

Her tenure on the High Court was short, as the United Nations General Assembly elected her to serve as a judge at the International Criminal Tribunal for Rwanda (ICTR) shortly after.

== International Criminal Tribunal for Rwanda (1995–2003) ==
In 1995, the Minister of Justice Abdullah Omar and President Mandela submitted Pillay's name as a nominee for the UN Security Council and a judge on the UN International Criminal Tribunal for Rwanda (ICTR). Between 1999 and 2003, Pillay served on the ICTR and was elected President Judge. She served for eight years, including four years as president. She was the only female judge for the first four years of the tribunal. Her tenure on the ICTR is best remembered for her role in the landmark trial of Jean-Paul Akayesu, which established that rape and sexual assault could constitute acts of genocide. Pillay said in an interview, "From time immemorial, rape has been regarded as spoils of war. Now it will be considered a war crime. We want to send out a strong signal that rape is no longer a trophy of war."

=== Notable cases ===
==== Rape as a form of genocide ====
In the case of The Prosecutor v Jean-Paul Akayesu on 2 September 1998, the court indicted Akayesu for being individually responsible for death and harm of Tutsis during the Rwandan Genocide. It was during the case that Pillay was able to set an international legal precedent which considered rape as a form of genocide and a crime against humanity. The court argued that crimes against humanity are not defined by their discriminatory intent. Rather, an act is considered a crime against humanity if it is "part of a widespread or systematic attack against any civilian population". In this case, Akayesu was mayor of the Taba commune where many Tutsi women took refuge and purposefully instructed the militia group to target and rape civilian women.

==== The role of media in inciting violence ====
Pillay also served on the Prosecutor v Ferdinand Nahimana, Jean-Bosco Barayagwiza, Hassan Ngeze trial regarding the role that Radio Télévision Libre des Mille Collines (RTLM) and Kangura magazine played in spreading hate propaganda against the Tutsis. The criminal tribunal found that Ferdinand Nahimana was indicted for the direct and public incitement to commit genocide while working at the radio station RTLM. Jean-Bosco Barayagwiza was also indicted for the direct and public incitement to commit genocide at RTLM and for his work with the Coalition for the Defence of the Republic. Hassan Ngeze was also charged for the incitement of genocide in relation to his work with Kangura magazine. The case was significant for considering the role media plays in politics and public opinion, and its real life ramifications.

== International Criminal Court (2003–2008) ==
Pillay garnered international recognition for her work as a judge on the ICTR and caught the attention of the members of the Women's Caucus for Gender Justice during the late 1990s. Impressed by her work, women's advocates wanted to ensure the protection of women's rights during the establishment of the International Criminal Court. The Women's Caucus gained enough momentum to attend PrepCom and the Rome Diplomatic Conference where they codified women's rights into the ICC statute, advocating that there be quota for the number of women judges on the bench and the use of "gender" instead of "sex" in the ICC provisions of the Rome Statue. After the establishment of the ICC, Pillay became one of the first judges to ever serve on the court.

Pillay was nominated to serve on the International Criminal Court's Appeal Chambers by the Assembly of State Parties to the Rome Statute on 7 February 2003.

She was elected to a six-year term that March, but resigned in July 2008, effective 31 August 2008, in order to take up her position with the UN.

One of the first cases to appear in the International Criminal Court was The Prosecutor v Thomas Lubanga Dyilo for enlisting children under 15 years old to the armed militias inciting violence between the Hema and Lendu ethnic groups in the Ituri, north-eastern region of the Democratic Republic of the Congo. While Dyilo was convicted for his war crimes in 2012, Pillay served on the appeals chamber during the pre-trial phase of the case from 2006 to the end of her term in 2008.

== UN High Commissioner for Human Rights (2008–2014) ==
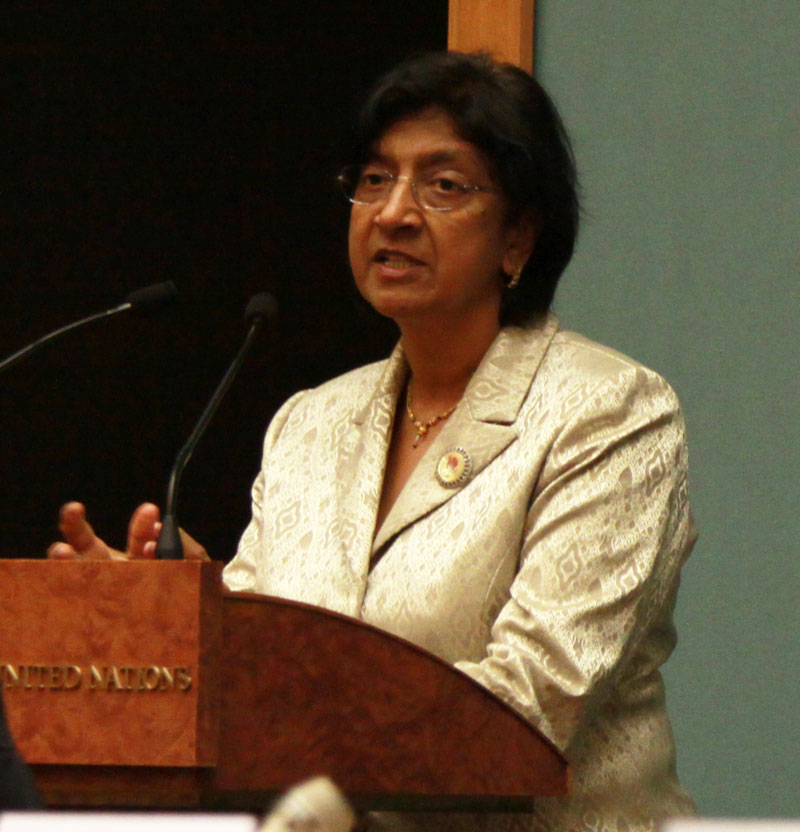
Navi Pillay speaking as High Commissioner for Human Rights in the UN

On 24 July 2008, UN Secretary-General Ban Ki-moon nominated Pillay to succeed Louise Arbour as High Commissioner for Human Rights. The United States reportedly resisted her appointment at first, because of her views on abortion and other issues, but eventually dropped its opposition. At a special meeting on 28 July 2008, the UN General Assembly confirmed the nomination by consensus. Her four-year term began on 1 September 2008. Pillay says the High Commissioner is "the voice of the victim everywhere". In 2012, she was given a two-year second term.

In 2009, Pillay called for international action to end caste discrimination and published the opinion piece "Tearing down the wall of caste" and subsequently gave a poignant interview in The Nation where she called for adopting UN Principles and Guidelines on caste-based discrimination. She followed up in 2013 with a strong statement on caste and gender at the UN Human Rights Council.

Pillay voiced support for a gay rights resolution in the UNHRC, which was approved in 2011. She also signed a document "Born Free and Equal", about sexual orientation and gender identity in international human rights law, during her term.

Pillay expressed concern about pressure being placed on private companies to enact a financial blockade against WikiLeaks in 2010. She said such action was a violation of WikiLeaks' right to freedom of expression. At a news conference in July 2014, she referred to Edward Snowden as a "human rights defender" and said, "I am raising right here some very important arguments that could be raised on his behalf so that these criminal proceedings are averted."

Pillay did not attend the 2010 Nobel Peace Prize ceremony honouring Chinese dissident Liu Xiaobo, held in Oslo on 10 December 2010. Her spokesman, Rupert Colville, told Foreign Policy that she was scheduled to host a Human Rights Day event in Geneva that day. After The Washington Post criticised her absence in an editorial, Pillay wrote to the newspaper that she had received no formal invitation from the Norwegian Nobel Committee and had never declined to attend. She added that she had welcomed the award and called for Liu's release from prison.

In a speech on 8 June 2012, Pillay blacklisted the provincial government of Quebec in Canada for human rights violations concerning the rights to peaceful protest and free expression for its student protesters, specifically in Canada. The bill in question, Bill 78, required that protest groups over 50 must gain approval from authorities at least 8 hours before the planned start of the protest. The reaction from human rights NGOs was mixed. Quebec official sources criticised Pillay for comparing Quebec with areas known to have worse records.

Pillay's call in 2012 for the suspension of sanctions against the Robert Mugabe regime in Zimbabwe was criticised by civil society groups in the country, which accused the Zimbabwean government of manipulating Pillay into overlooking the human rights violations committed by the government.

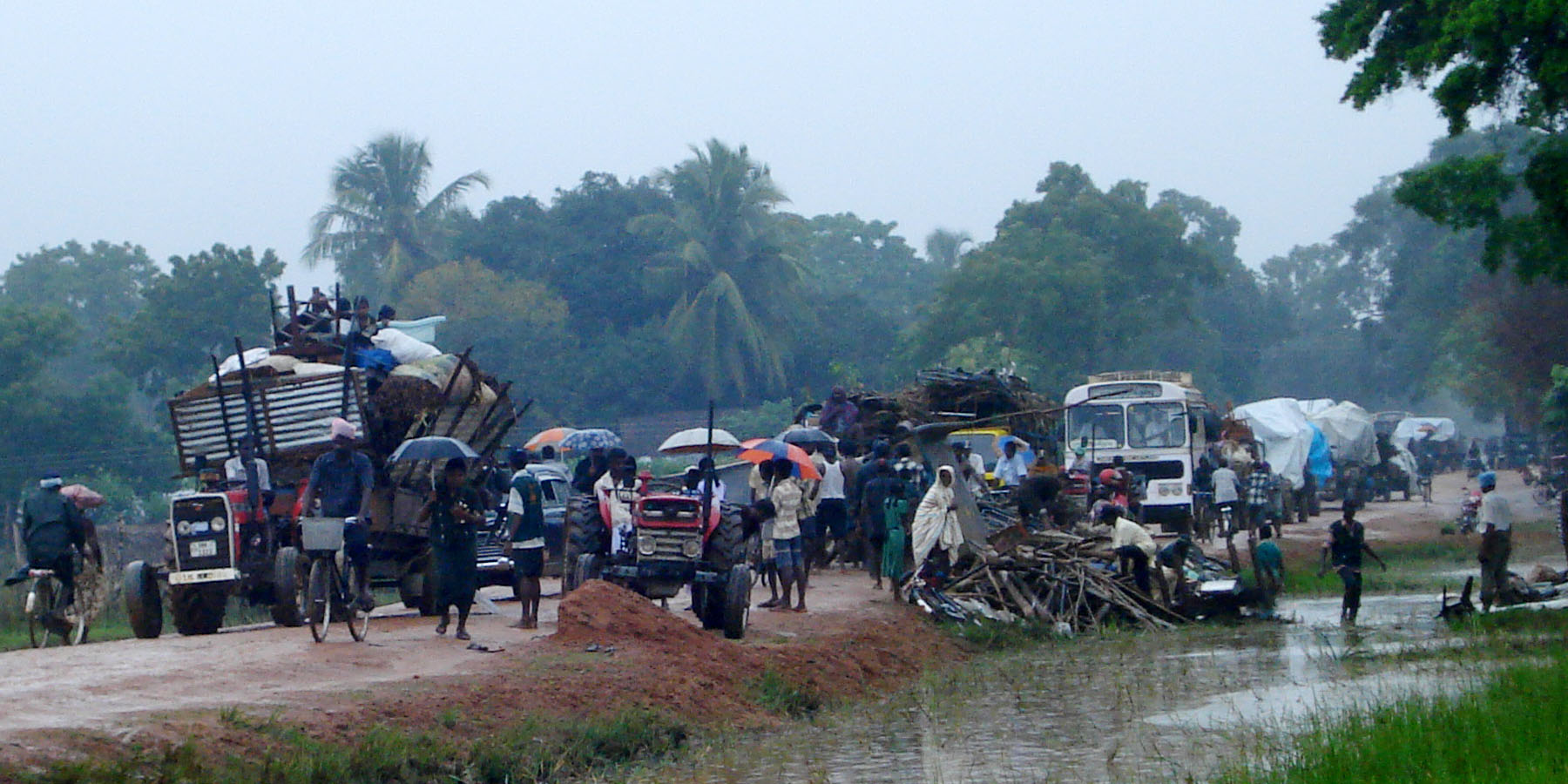
Civilians displaced during the Sri Lankan Civil War

Her 2013 criticism of the Sri Lankan government being an authoritarian state, in alleging human rights violations and atrocities committed by them against Tamil civilians at the end of the Sri Lankan civil war, led the government and its supporters to apportion her own Tamil descent as the only reason for her criticism, a claim she strongly denies.

During the 2014 Gaza war, Pillay stated that both Israel and Hamas had likely violated international law. Her statement that Israel had engaged in the "apparent targeting... of seven children playing on a Gaza beach" during the 2014 Gaza war beach bombings was criticised in a Fox News op-ed by Anne Bayefsky as "incitement to hate". Pillay also criticised US funding of the Iron Dome program, noting that "no such protection has been provided to Gazans against the shelling". Liel Leibovitz in an article for Tablet, described the statement as a "hilariously delicious absurdity". On 25 July 2014, the United States Congress published a letter addressed to Pillay by over 100 members in which the signatories asserted that the Human Rights Council "cannot be taken seriously as a human rights organisation" because of their investigation of Israel's conduct during the war.

In August 2014, she criticised the international community over its "paralysis" in dealing with the more than three-year-old Syrian Civil War, which by 30 April 2014 had resulted in 191,369 deaths.

== International Court of Justice ==
Navi Pillay in 2018

The composition of the bench of the International Court of Justice varies from case to case. In cases where there are no judges of the nationality of one or both of the parties present, an ad hoc can be appointed to serve on the bench. Pillay has been serving as an ad hoc judge on the Rohingya genocide case (The Gambia v Myanmar) for crimes of genocide since 2019, having been designated by The Gambia, a party in the case. The case was brought by The Gambia against Myanmar for violating the Genocide Convention in its treatment of the Rohingya. Despite pushback from Myanmar, the court approved The Gambia's case as admissible and continues to hold hearings. The case is notable in that it involves one country (The Gambia), a signatory of the Genocide Convention, suing another fellow signatory (Myanmar) on behalf of a third party and non-signatory (Organisation of Islamic Cooperation).On 19 November 2026, 11 judges (out of the total 15) of the International Court of Justice, held that Myanmar had violated its obligation to take effective measures to prevent the destruction and ensure the preservation of evidence related to allegations of acts within the scope of Article II of the Convention on the Prevention and Punishment of the Crime of Genocide agaisnt the Rohingya community.

== Commission of Inquiry on Occupied Palestinian Territory ==
Pillay was chair of the UN Independent International Commission of Inquiry on the Occupied Palestinian Territory, created after the 2021 Israel–Palestine crisis, until November 2025. Pillay has said that "some states, including the United States and Europe [sic], did not support the establishment of the commission" because it had no formal end date, to which Pillay responded that "the [Israeli] occupation does not have an end date either and you tend to support that occupation".

In June 2024, the commission issued its findings, stating that war crimes had been committed by both Hamas and Israel in the aftermath of the 7 October attacks. In July 2025, the three members of the commission announced that they were planning to resign due to personal reasons. In September 2025, the Commission of Inquiry determined that Israel had committed genocide during the Gaza war.

Pillay has denounced Israel for disproportionately targeting civilians, including children, and has stated that these actions cannot be justified as self-defence. In an op-ed in The New York Times in September 2025, she stated that the world has an obligation to prevent genocide, by stopping military support to Israel, and "using all available diplomatic and legal means to stop the killing". In response, Israeli officials and pro-Israel lobby groups such as UN Watch, the Anti-Defamation League and the Simon Wiesenthal Center have accused Pillay of antisemitism and anti-Israel bias, citing her statements and positions to support their allegations, such as denying Israel's right to self-defense against non-state terrorist groups, in addition to alleged downplaying and legitimizing of Palestinian terrorism, among other statements.

== Other roles ==
Navi Pillay in 2013

During her time in private practice, she also contributed to society and the law in many other ways. As a member of the Women's National Coalition, she contributed to the inclusion in South Africa's Constitution of an equality clause prohibiting discrimination on the grounds of race, religion and sexual orientation.

In 1980, Pillay was a lecturer at the University of KwaZulu-Natal.

In 1986, she co-founded, along with Anshu Padayachee, the Advice Desk for Abused Women in Durban, initially running it from their own homes. The organisation later changed its name to the Advice Desk for the Abused, expanding its support to children, elderly people, and people with disabilities, and moved to the campus of the former University of Durban-Westville. By 2026 it had provided assistance to around 500,000 people. Padayachee was a lecturer in criminology, and was later acting vice-chancellor of the ML Sultan Technikon. She died in July 2023.

In 1992, Pillay co-founded international women's rights group Equality Now in New York, along with two other human rights lawyers, Jessica Neuwirth, and Feryal Gharahi. The aim was to bring equality for women into the field of human rights.

In 1995, she served as vice-president of the University of Durban-Westville.

As of 2026, Pillay is president of the International Commission Against the Death Penalty, based in Madrid, Spain; member of the Advisory Council of the International Nuremberg Principles Academy; and chair of the Quasi-Judicial Inquiry into Detention in the Democratic People's Republic of Korea.

== Recognition and awards ==
=== Nobel Peace Prize ===
In October 2026, Pillay was awarded the Nobel Peace Prize. The citation read:

The Norwegian Nobel Committee attaches importance to Navi Pillay's role as a driving force in the development of an international system of law and order, while further emphasising her judicial rigour, personal integrity and considerable courage. At a time when the number of wars and conflicts is rising, and when judges and institutions of international law are under political attack, the Nobel Committee wishes to issue a reminder that the ability to resolve conflicts without force or violence is dependent on the international rule of law. An international legal system in which war criminals are held to account and the victims of abuse see justice served is a precondition for a peaceful world.

In its announcement, the committee highlighted Pillay's contribution to the prosecution of war crimes, crimes against humanity and genocide, and to strengthening international legal institutions. It singled out her influence on the Rwanda tribunal's recognition that rape and sexual violence could constitute crimes against humanity and genocide. The committee placed the award in the context of increasing armed conflict and political pressure on international courts and judges, arguing that legal accountability and justice for victims were essential to lasting peace.

Pillay became the first South African woman to be awarded the Nobel Peace Prize. She is the fifth South African individual to do so, after Albert Luthuli (1960); Desmond Tutu (1984); and Nelson Mandela and F. W. de Klerk, who shared the prize in 1993.

Pillay learned of the award while attending an international conference in Courtroom 600 of the Nuremberg Palace of Justice, where the post-war trials of Nazi leaders took place. According to NobelPrize.org, the committee had been unable to contact her before the announcement; Norwegian Nobel Institute director Kristian Berg Harpviken subsequently conveyed the news personally. In a telephone interview, she associated the recognition with the institutions she had served and the people she had worked for.

=== Honorary degrees ===
Pillay has been awarded honorary degrees by:

- Durban University of Technology, South Africa
- University of the Witwatersrand, South Africa
- University of Cape Town, South Africa
- Durham University, UK
- City University of New York School of Law, US
- London School of Economics, UK
- Rhodes University, South Africa
- Catholic University of Leuven, Belgium
- Erasmus University Rotterdam, Netherlands
- University of Geneva, Switzerland
- University of Fribourg, Switzerland
- Nelson Mandela University, South Africa

=== Honours ===
- 2014: Grand Officier of the Order of Ouissam Alaouite (Morocco)
- 2020: Commander of the Order of Merit of the Federal Republic of Germany

=== Other recognition ===
Pillay has received many other awards and honours over the course of her career, including:

- 2003: Gruber Prize for Women's Rights
- 2009: Golden Plate Award of the American Academy of Achievement, South Africa
- 2009: Forbes ranking – the 64th most powerful woman in the world
- 2023: World Jurist Association's Ruth Bader Ginsburg Medal of Honor, presented by H.M. King Felipe VI of Spain, alongside Javier Cremades (President of the World Jurist Association).
- 2025: Sydney Peace Prize
- 2026: Olof Palme Prize

== Personal life ==
She met her husband Paranjothee "Gaby" Anthony Pillay, also a lawyer, at a student dance in 1962. The two married in January 1965 and, after finding that they were unable to conceive, the couple adopted two baby girls a few years apart, Isvari and Kamini.

Their marriage lasted for around 30 years, despite long periods apart as Navi had to move to Tanzania for the Rwanda tribunal, and then to The Hague for the ICC. Gaby's career was broken up during apartheid, as he was detained for his anti-apartheid activism, and he later succumbed to alcoholism. He died in the late 1990s.

== See also ==
- Naidoo/Naidu
- Francesca Albanese
- First women lawyers around the world
- List of first women lawyers and judges in Africa
- United Nations Free & Equal

Diplomatic posts
Preceded by Louise Arbour	United Nations High Commissioner for Human Rights; 2008–2014	Succeeded by Zeid bin Ra'ad
