= Finnish National Theatre =

Theatre in Helsinki, Finland

- Suomen Kansallisteatteri
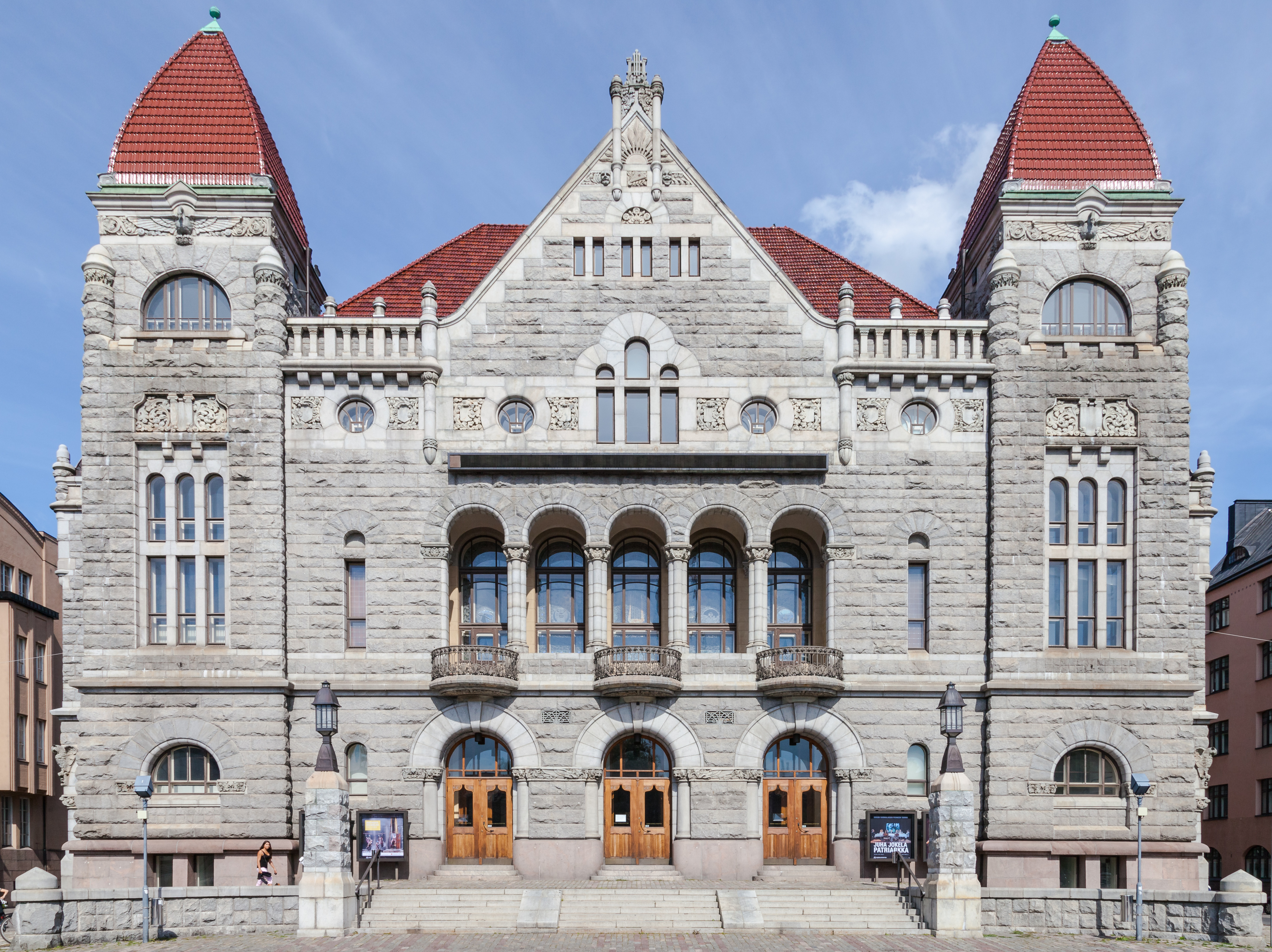
- The Finnish National Theatre

- The location of the theatre in Helsinki
- Address: Läntinen Teatterikuja 1, 00100 Helsinki, Finland
- Coordinates: 60°10′19.92″N 24°56′37.9″E
- Capacity: 1424; 885 (Main Stage); 309 (Small Stage); 152 (Willensauna Stage); 78 (Omapohja Studio)
- Type: Theatre
- Public transit: Helsinki Central railway station

Construction
- Opened: 9 April 1902; 124 years ago
- Expanded: 1954, 1976, 1987
- Architects: Onni Tarjanne and Heikki & Kaija Siren

Website
- www.kansallisteatteri.fi

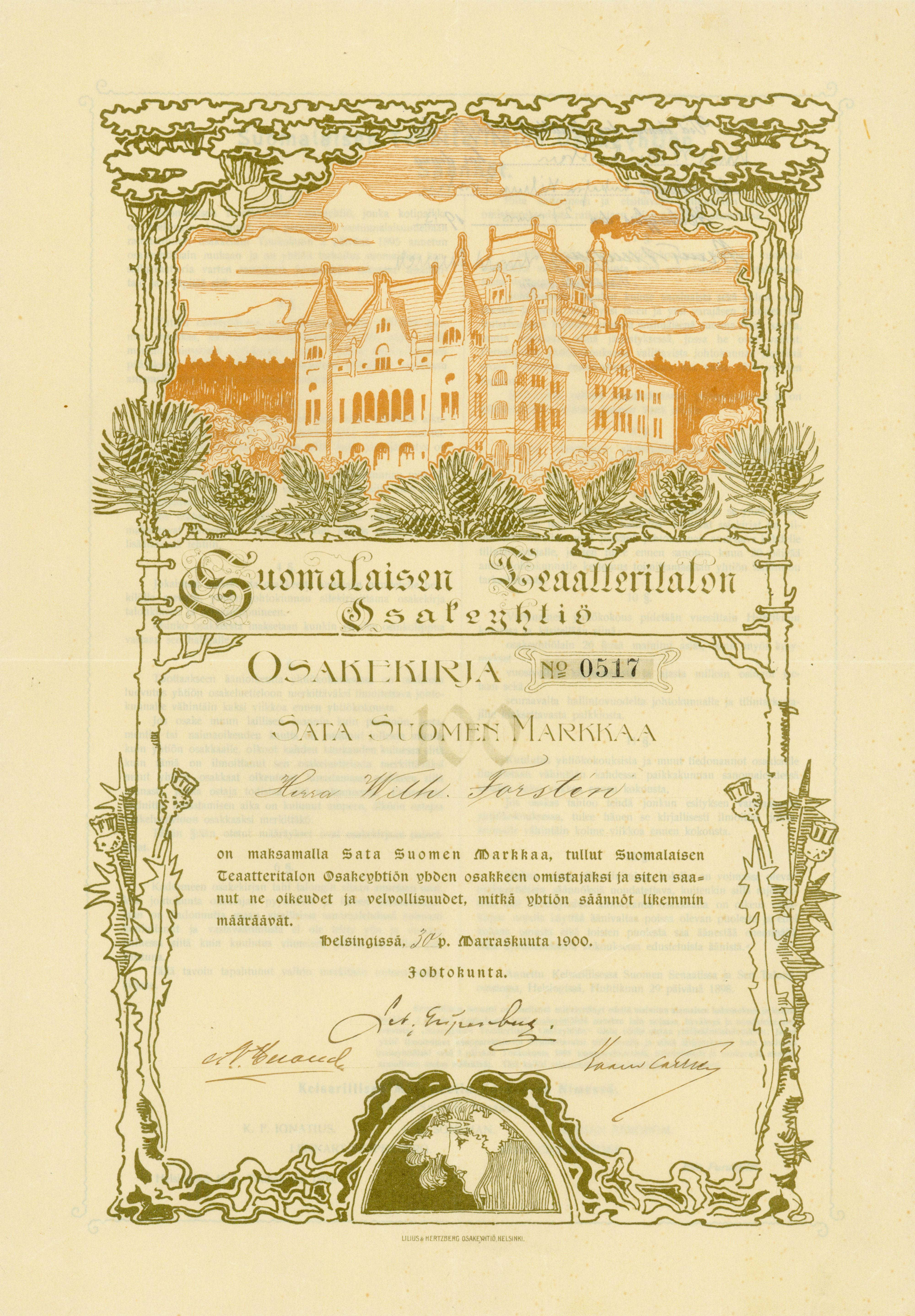
Share of the Finnish Theatre, issued 30 March 1900

The Finnish National Theatre (Finnish: Suomen Kansallisteatteri), established in 1872, is a theatre located in central Helsinki on the northern side of the Helsinki Central Railway Station Square. The Finnish National Theatre is the oldest Finnish speaking professional theatre in Finland. It was known as the Finnish Theatre until 1902, when it was renamed the Finnish National Theatre.

For the first thirty years of its existence, the theatre functioned primarily as a touring company. The theatre did not acquire a permanent home until 1902, when a purpose-built structure was erected in the heart of Helsinki, adjacent to the city's main railway station. The building hosting the Finnish National Theatre today was completed in 1902 and designed by architect Onni Tarjanne in the National Romantic style, inspired by romantic nationalism. The theatre still operates in these premises today, and over the years the building has expanded from its original size to encompass another three permanent stages. In addition to the Main Stage (Suuri näyttämö), the theatre comprises the Small Stage (Pieni näyttämö) built in 1954 (by architects Heikki Siren and Kaija Siren), the Willensauna Stage built in 1976, and the Omapohja studio built in 1987. The theatre is often associated with the Finnish national romantic writer Aleksis Kivi, as the Aleksis Kivi Memorial is located in front of it.

== History ==
The Finnish Theatre was founded in the Grand Duchy of Finland in 1872. The Grand Duke of Finland, Emperor of Russia, Alexander II, and the Imperial Senate of Finland approved the founding of the theatre. In 1863, Emperor Alexander II elevated the Finnish language to an equal status alongside Swedish. The founding of the theatre was part of Emperor Alexander II's favorable attitude toward the status of Finnish. The improvement of the Finnish language's status also increased its standing among the elite.

The Finnish National Theatre is the oldest Finnish speaking professional theatre in Finland.

The birth of the Finnish National Theatre was closely linked to the nation's political and cultural ideology during the late nineteenth century. Finland was a part of the Russian Empire, and its intellectual elite was Swedish speaking. Finnish language and art, including theatre, became the cornerstones of a cultural movement which began in the 1860s, gradually developing political ambitions by the turn of the century, and eventually leading to national independence in 1917.

The theatre was established as a touring theatre in 1872 by the name Suomalainen teatteri, The Finnish Theatre. The first performance was given on 13 October 1872 in the west coast town of Pori at the Hotel Otava, which today is considered to be the birthplace of the Finnish-language theatre. For the first thirty years of its existence, The Finnish Theatre functioned primarily as a touring company. Its first directors were the siblings Kaarlo and Emilie Bergbom.

The theatre did not acquire a permanent home until 1902, after a purpose-built structure was erected prominently in the heart of Helsinki, adjacent to the city's main railway station, the Helsinki Central railway station. The building was designed by Onni Tarjanne in the National Romantic style, inspired by romantic nationalism. At the same time, the name Finnish Theatre was switched into the Finnish National Theatre. In 1939, the Aleksis Kivi Memorial (designed by Wäinö Aaltonen) was erected in front of the theatre, to commemorate the Aleksis Kivi and his role in Finnish theatrical art.

The Finnish National Theatre building is reportedly haunted by at least three ghosts – an unknown Grey Lady and the ghosts of actors Urho Somersalmi and Aarne Leppänen.

== Stages ==
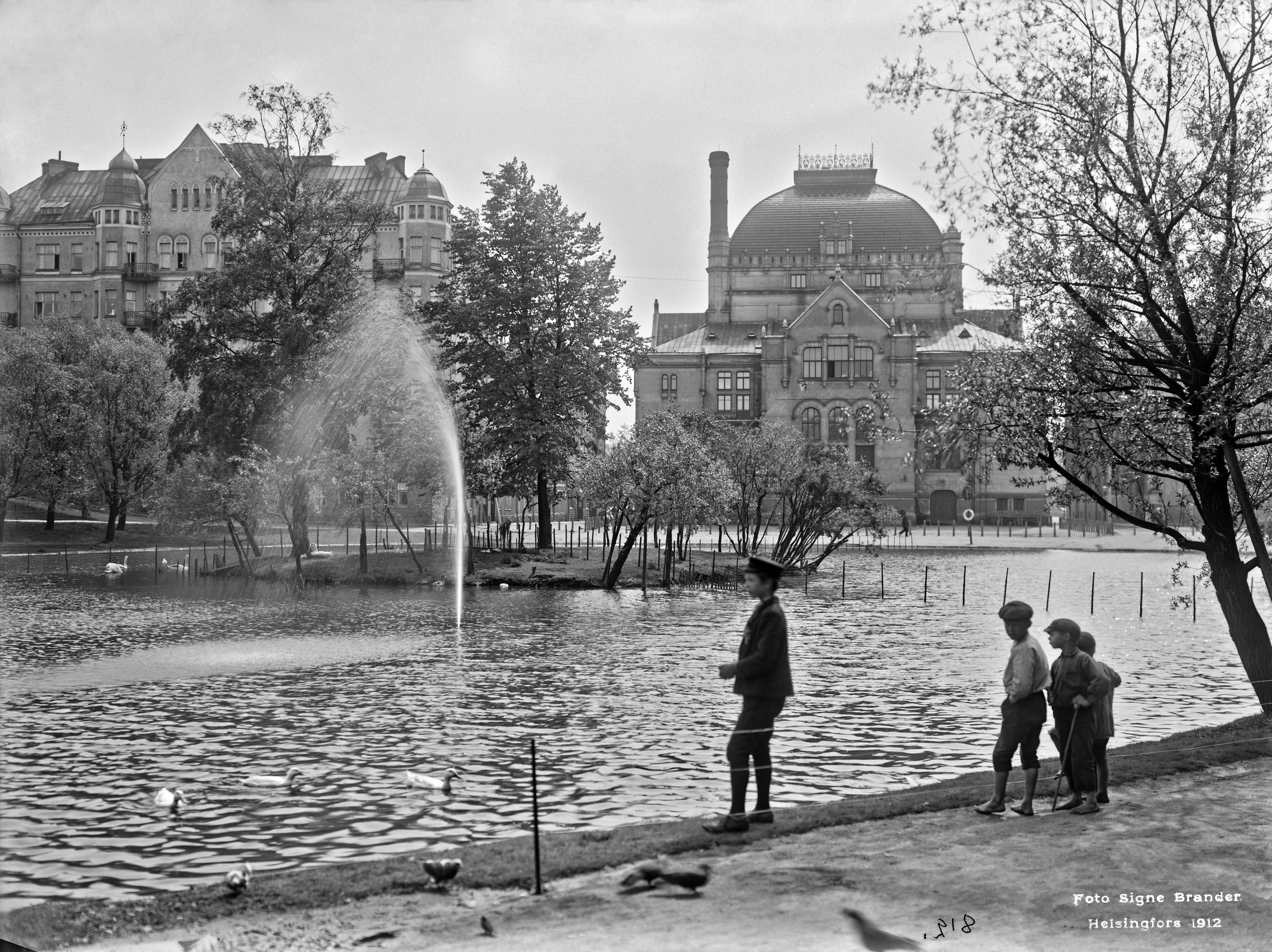
The northern side of the building, which hosts the Small Stage and the Willensauna Stage. Picture from 1902.

The Finnish National Theatre currently houses four permanent stages:

- The Main Stage (Finnish: Suuri Näyttämö) – since 1902 (885 seats)
- The Small Stage (Finnish: Pieni Näyttämö) – since 1954 (309 seats)
- The Willensauna Stage – since 1976 (152 seats)
- The Omapohja Studio – since 1987 (78 seats)

=== Touring stage ===
The theatre established a new production unit in 2010, which was given the name of Touring Stage. This unit, which has no fixed stage, aims to take small-scale touring performances to locations throughout the country which have little or no access to theatre, such as schools, day care centres, homes for the elderly, hospitals, welfare reception centres, prisons, and so on. The Touring Stage's programme focuses on topical issues which are developed through community research and interaction, reaching out and giving voice to marginalised sectors of society.

== Club scene ==
In January 2011 the theatre's former restaurant reopened as the Club Scene (Finnish: Lavaklubi), transformed into a late-evening club-like entertainment spot. The space has been given a new look, refurbished in a piano-bar stroke artist's living-room style, and hosts various types of music, drama, and poetry performances as well as discussion evenings and artist soirées.

== Theatre directors ==
- Kaarlo Bergbom 1872–1906 (jointly with Emilie Bergbom)
- Emilie Bergbom 1872–1917 (jointly with Kaarlo Bergbom)
- Jalmari Hahl 1905- 1907
- Adolf Lindfors 1907–1914
- Jalmari Lahdensuo 1914–1917
- Eino Kalima 1917–1950
- Arvi Kivimaa 1950–1974
- Kai Savola 1974–1991
- Maria-Liisa Nevala 1992–2010
- Mika Myllyaho 2010–

== See also ==
- Alexander Theatre
- List of national theatres
- Swedish Theatre
- Finnish National Opera and Ballet
- Kluuvi
