= Kaarlo Bergbom =

Finnish theatre director

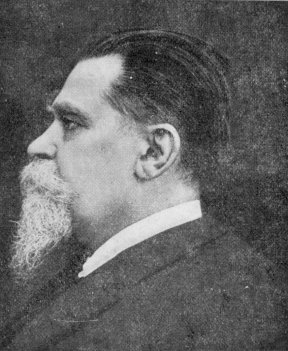
Kaarlo Bergbom

Kaarlo Juhana (Karl Johan) Bergbom (2 October 1843, Viipuri – 17 January 1906, Helsinki) was a Finnish theatre director. He was also the founder of the Finnish National Theatre, the first Finnish language theatre company. He was joint director of the Finnish National Theatre with his sister Emilie Bergbom from its foundation in 1872 until her death in 1905.

He wrote (though very little) as a playwright, and he was responsible for introducing a number of important Finnish dramatists, particularly Minna Canth, and Finnish translations of William Shakespeare and other foreign writers. Bergbom also founded the magazine Kirjallinen Kuukausilehti.

He was the brother of senator Ossian Wuorenheimo as well as Emilie Bergbom. He is buried in the Hietaniemi Cemetery in Helsinki.

== Publications ==
- Pombal och jesuiterna (1865)
- Det historiska dramat i Tyskland (1868)
- Morsiamen tulo miehelään (1898)
- Kaarlo Bergbomin kirjoitukset (1907-08)
- Saimaan rannalla (1880)
