= Topčider Case =

The Topčider Case or the Guardsmen Murder Case (Serbian: Убиство гардиста, romanized: Ubistvo gardista) was an affair regarding the death of two soldiers of the Guards Unit of the Army of Serbia and Montenegro in 2004. The guardsmen, Dražen Milovanović and Dragan Jakovljević, were killed at their guarding posts in the Karaš military facility in Topčider, Belgrade, on 5 October 2004. No person was ever persecuted for this double-murder, and the case remains unsolved.

== Investigation ==
First commission, set up by the military, found that the two soldiers died in a murder-suicide incident, without the involvement of any other persons. The expertise ordered by the Investigating magistrate of the Court Martial in Belgrade, Vuk Tufegdžić ascertained that Jakovljević killed Milovanović, and then committed suicide. On the occasion, 20 bullets were shot.

Because of the apparent faults of the Tufegdžić commission, the President of Serbia and Montenegro Svetozar Marović, formed new State Investigative Commission led by the attorney-in-law Božo Prelević. In this investigation, it was ascertained in an indisputably professional manner, by expertise, that both soldiers had been killed by a third person. Such findings of the National Committee were confirmed by ballistic experts of FBI Quantico Laboratory from Washington, D.C. as well as the forensic expert Ljubomir Dragović, also from the USA.

The murder remains unsolved and the investigation is still ongoing. No person was ever prosecuted for the deaths of two soldiers. In 2013, the Constitutional Court of Serbia ruled that the right to a fair trial and the right to life of families of the killed guardsmen have been violated. In 2016, the Government of Serbia made official decision to form third Commission for the investigation of the Case. As of March 2020, members of this Commission have not been named yet. In 2016, then Prime Minister of Serbia, Aleksandar Vučić spoke about "very important information collected by the police", but refused to reveal any details.

The scenario most commonly debated by the media is that the soldiers were killed after they saw General Ratko Mladić (fugitive from the ICTY) hiding in the military facility. This version was also suggested by the prosecution at the Mladić Trial and the families of the two guardsmen.
