= Sidhwa =

Sidhwa (Urdu: سدھوا) is a surname, commonly used in Pakistan. Notable people with the surname include:

- Bapsi Sidhwa (1938–2024), Pakistani writer
- Godrej Sidhwa (1925–2011), Pakistani Zoroastrian priest
- Rustam S. Sidhwa (1927–1997), Pakistani judge
- Zarnak Sidhwa (born 1972), Pakistani chef and chocolatier
