= Liu Daqun =

Chinese judge and diplomat (born 1950)

- 刘大群
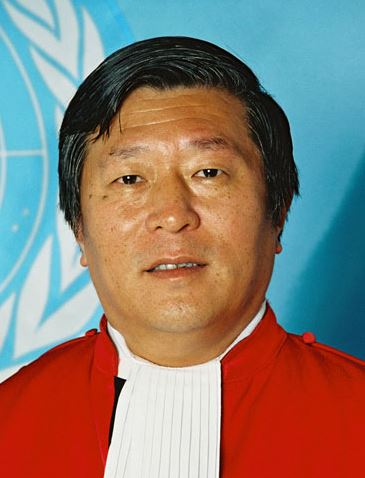
- Liu in 2014

Judge of the International Residual Mechanism for Criminal Tribunals
- Incumbent
- Assumed office 1 July 2012

Vice-President of the International Criminal Tribunal for the former Yugoslavia
- In office 17 November 2015 – 31 December 2017
- Preceded by: Carmel Agius
- Succeeded by: Office abolished

Judge of the International Criminal Tribunal for the former Yugoslavia
- In office 3 April 2000 – 31 December 2017
- Preceded by: Wang Tieya

Chinese Ambassador to Jamaica
- In office 1999–2000

Personal details
- Born: 20 September 1950 (age 75) Shandong, China
- Education: Beijing Foreign Language Institute (BA); Beijing Foreign Affairs College; Tufts University (MA)

Liu Daqun (simplified Chinese: 刘大群; traditional Chinese: 劉大群; pinyin: Liú Dàqún born 20 September 1950, in China) is a Chinese judge and diplomat who served as a judge of the International Criminal Tribunal for the former Yugoslavia from 2000 to 2017 and a judge of the International Residual Mechanism for Criminal Tribunals since 2012.

== Early life and education ==
Liu was born on 20 September 1950 in Shandong, China. He graduated with a bachelor's degree in English from the Beijing Foreign Language Institute in 1977, a certificate in international law from the Beijing Foreign Affairs College in 1978 and a master's degree in international law and international relations from the Fletcher School of Law and Diplomacy of Tufts University in 1986.

== Career ==
Liu held a number of positions in the treaty and law department of the Chinese Foreign Ministry, handling private international law, law of the sea, international criminal law and United Nations matters. In 1998, he was deputy head and chief negotiator of the Chinese delegation at the Rome conference on the establishment of the International Criminal Court. In 1999, he was appointed Chinese ambassador to Jamaica and permanent representative to the International Seabed Authority.

On 3 April 2000, Liu was sworn in as a judge of the International Criminal Tribunal for the former Yugoslavia (ICTY), replacing judge Wang Tieya. From 2001 until 2005, he was the presiding judge of Trial Chamber I. In 2005, he was appointed to the appeals chamber for the ICTY and the International Criminal Tribunal for Rwanda. He was the final vice-president of the ICTY from 2015 to 2017. He has also been a judge of the International Residual Mechanism for Criminal Tribunals since its commencement in 2012.

Liu is a member of the Permanent Court of Arbitration and of the Institute de Droit International.
