= Prisca Matimba Nyambe =

Zambian judge (born 1951)

Judge of the International Residual Mechanism for Criminal Tribunals
- Incumbent
- Assumed office 1 July 2012

Judge of the International Criminal Tribunal for the former Yugoslavia
- In office 1 December 2009 – 18 December 2012

Personal details
- Born: 31 December 1951 (age 74) Zambia
- Education: University of Zambia

Prisca Matimba Nyambe, SC is a Zambian judge who also sits on international tribunals. She is known for dissenting from the majority decisions of the International Criminal Tribunal for the former Yugoslavia (ICTY) judgements which convicted Ratko Mladić and Zdravko Tolimir of war crimes.

Nyambe was born on 31 December 1951 in Zambia and studied law at the University of Zambia, graduating in 1975.

She was a resident magistrate in Kabwe, Zambia from 1978 to 1980, and a senior magistrate, in Harare and Gwelo, Zimbabwe, from 1980 to 1984.

From 1984 to 1992 she was legal counsel to the Bank of Zambia, and from 1992 to 1996 worked in private practice. In February 1996, she became a senior legal officer at the International Criminal Tribunal for Rwanda (ICTR), in Arusha, Tanzania, rising to be general counsel to the ICTR, until 2006.

She was appointed a judge of the High Court of Zambia in 2006, retiring from the post in 2015. She became a Judge ad litem of the ICTY in 2009, and has been a judge of the United Nations' International Residual Mechanism for Criminal Tribunals since 2011.

Presiding over the appeal of Ratko Mladić, a Bosnian Serb general convicted of genocide, dissented on 8 June 2021 by voting to grant his appeal on all grounds except hostage-taking and to order a retrial, standing alone against the four other judges.

She served as a Council Member of the Law Association of Zambia from 1982 to 1994, being vice-chair in the final year. She sat on a Zambian Parliamentary Fact-Finding Committee into discriminatory laws against women.

She was granted the honour of being appointed a State Counsel by the President of Zambia, Levy Mwanawasa, in 2005.
