= International Residual Mechanism for Criminal Tribunals =

International criminal court

- French: Mécanisme international appelé à exercer les fonctions résiduelles des Tribunaux pénaux
- Seal of the Mechanism
- Established: 22 December 2010
- Location: Arusha, Tanzania; The Hague, Netherlands
- Authorised by: UNSC Resolution 1966
- Website: www.irmct.org

President
- Currently: Graciela Gatti Santana
- Since: 1 July 2022

Prosecutor
- Currently: Serge Brammertz
- Since: 29 February 2016

Registrar
- Currently: Abubacarr Marie Tambadou
- Since: 1 July 2020

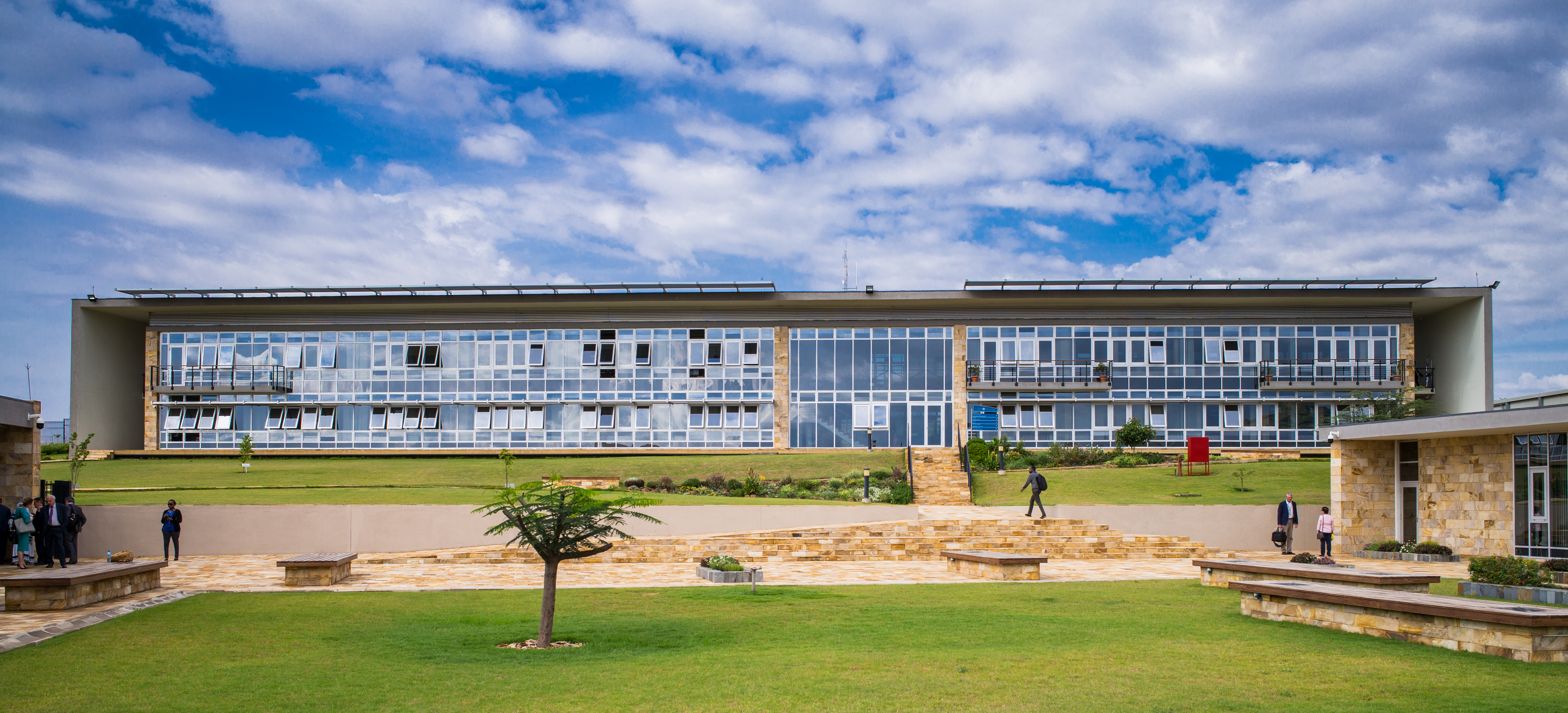
International Residual Mechanism for Criminal Tribunals building in Arusha, Tanzania

The International Residual Mechanism for Criminal Tribunals (abbreviated to IRMCT or MICT, or the Mechanism) (Note: In other languages: French: Mécanisme international appelé à exercer les fonctions résiduelles des Tribunaux pénaux; Serbo-Croatian: Međunarodni rezidualni mehanizam za krivične sudove; Kinyarwanda: Urwego Mpuzamahanga Rwashyiriweho Gukora Imirimo y'Insigarira y'Inkiko Mpanabyaha) is an international court established by the United Nations Security Council in 2010 to perform the remaining functions of the International Criminal Tribunal for the former Yugoslavia (ICTY) and the International Criminal Tribunal for Rwanda (ICTR) following the completion of those tribunals' respective mandates. It is based in both Arusha, Tanzania, and The Hague, Netherlands.

== Background ==
In the early 1990s, the United Nations Security Council established two criminal courts whose purpose was to investigate and prosecute individuals responsible for war crimes, crimes against humanity, and genocide. The first of these courts was the International Criminal Tribunal for the former Yugoslavia (ICTY), which was established in 1993 to investigate crimes committed during the Yugoslav Wars. The second court, the International Criminal Tribunal for Rwanda (ICTR), was established the following year to address crimes committed during the Rwandan genocide.

Both the ICTY and the ICTR were meant to be temporary institutions that would conclude after their mandate to investigate crimes and prosecute individuals was completed. For example, convicted persons may still petition for early release, protective orders for witnesses may need to be modified, and the archives that contain confidential documents need to be safeguarded. In order to oversee the residual functions of the ICTY and ICTR in an efficient manner, the Security Council passed Resolution 1966 on 22 December 2010, which created the Mechanism.

== Mandate ==
In Resolution 1966, the Security Council decided that "the Mechanism shall continue the jurisdiction, rights and obligations and essential functions of the ICTY and the ICTR." The Security Council further envisioned that the Mechanism would be "a small, temporary and efficient structure, whose functions and size will diminish over time, with a small number of staff commensurate with its reduced functions." The Mechanism will continue to operate until the Security Council decides otherwise, however it has been subject to a two-year review beginning in 2016.

The Mechanism comprises two branches. One branch covers functions inherited from the ICTR and is located in Arusha, Tanzania. It commenced functioning on 1 July 2012. The other branch is located in The Hague, Netherlands and began operating on 1 July 2013. During the initial period of the Mechanism's work, there was a temporal overlap with the ICTR and the ICTY as these institutions complete outstanding work on any trial or appeal proceedings which are pending as of the commencement dates of the respective branches of the Mechanism.

== Fugitives ==
The tracking, arrest and prosecution of the remaining fugitives still wanted for trial by the ICTR was a top priority for the Mechanism for International Criminal Tribunals, and was carried out by the OTP Fugitive Tracking Team

With the arrest and transfer in 2011 of the last two fugitives for the ICTY, Ratko Mladić and Goran Hadžić, what was originally envisaged as a function of the Mechanism – the trial of the ICTY's remaining fugitives - was completed by the ICTY.

Under Article 6(3) of its Statute, the Mechanism shall only retain jurisdiction over those individuals considered to be the most responsible for committing the gravest crimes. In accordance with this Article, the ICTR Prosecutor requested referrals to Rwanda in the cases of the last two fugitives: Charles Sikubwabo and Charles Ryandikayo, later declared dead on 15 May 2024. With these deaths, the IRMCT announced that all ICTR fugitives had been successfully accounted for.

Over 1000 Génocidaire fugitives are sought by national authorities and the IRMCT continues to assist in the tracking of these fugitives.

== Principals ==
The Principals of the Mechanism are the three persons who head the three separate organs of the Mechanism. All principals are appointed to renewable four-year terms.

=== President ===
The President is head and the most senior judge of the Chambers, the judicial division of the Mechanism. The President is appointed by the Secretary-General following consultations with the President of the Security Council and the judges of the Mechanism.

Name	State	Term began	Term ended	Ref.
Theodor Meron	United States	1 March 2012	18 January 2019	
Carmel Agius	Malta	19 January 2019	30 June 2022	
Graciela Gatti Santana	Uruguay	1 July 2022	In office	

=== Prosecutor ===
The Prosecutor leads the investigation and prosecution of cases before the Mechanism and is nominated by the Secretary-General and appointed by the Security Council.

Name	State	Term began	Term ended	Ref.
Hassan Jallow	Gambia, The	1 March 2012	29 February 2016	
Serge Brammertz	Belgium	1 March 2016	In office	

=== Registrar ===
The Registrar, appointed by the Secretary-General, leads the Registry, which provides administrative, legal, policy and diplomatic support to Mechanism operations.

Name	State	Term began	Term ended	Ref.
John Hocking	Australia	18 January 2012	31 December 2016	
Olufemi Elias	Nigeria	1 January 2017	30 June 2020	
Abubacarr Marie Tambadou	Gambia, The	1 July 2020	In office	

== Judges ==
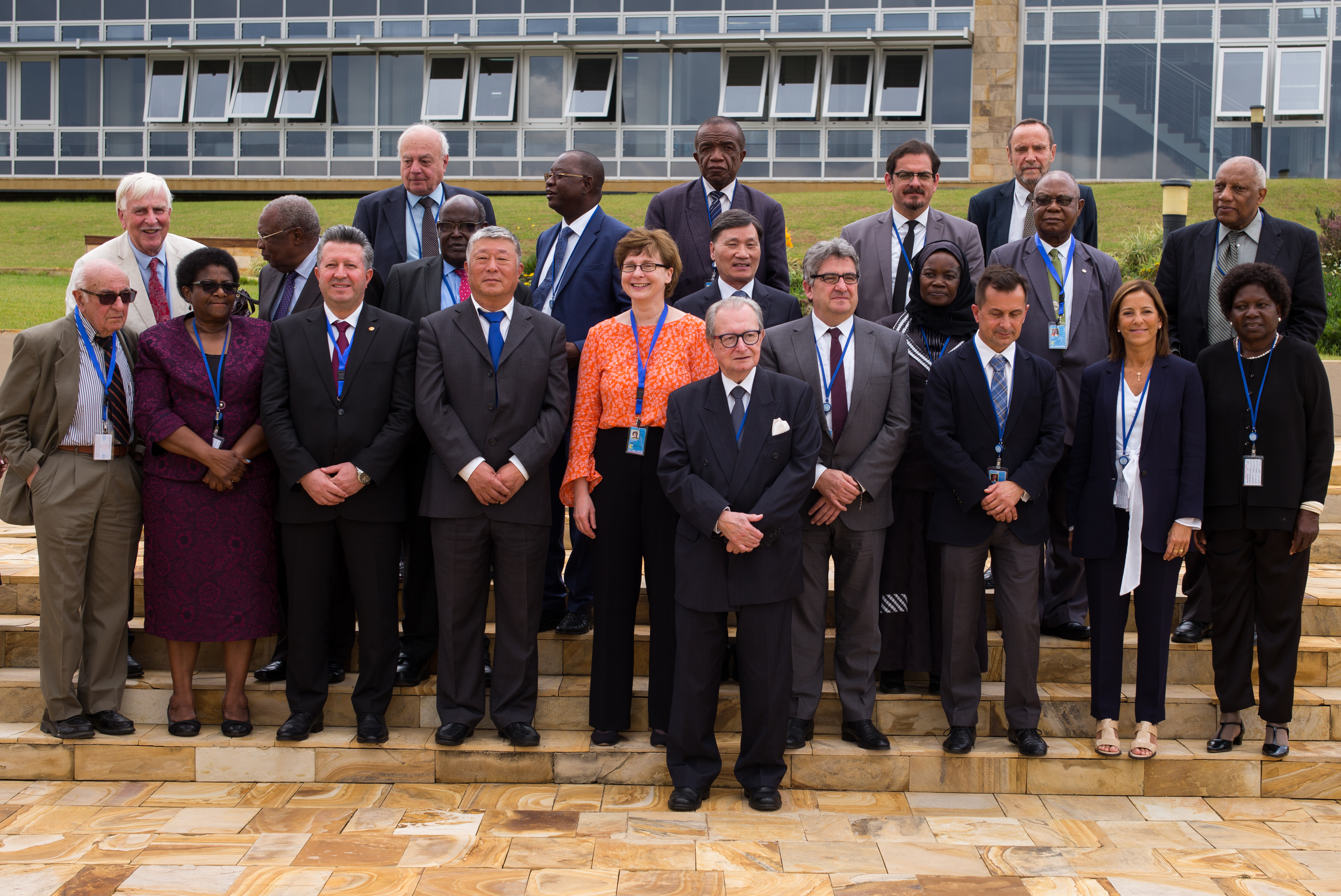
Judges of the IRMCT (2019)

The judges of the Mechanism are elected by the General Assembly from a roster prepared by the Security Council following nominations from member states of the United Nations. Judges serve for a term of four years and can be reappointed by the Secretary-General with the consultation of the Presidents of the Security Council and of the General Assembly. The Judges are present at the Mechanism only when necessary and at the request of the President. As much as possible, the Judges carry out their functions remotely.

Name	State	Term began	Term ended	Ref(s).
Carmel Agius	Malta	1 July 2012	In office	
Aydin Sefa Akay	Turkey	1 July 2012	30 June 2018	
Yusuf Aksar	Turkey	21 December 2018	In office	
René José Andriatianarivelo	Madagascar	20 February 2024	In office	
Jean-Claude Antonetti	France	1 July 2012	In office	
Florence Rita Arrey	Cameroon	1 July 2012	In office	
Mustapha El Baaj	Morocco	15 January 2019	In office	
Iain Bonomy	United Kingdom	6 February 2020	In office	
Solomy Balungi Bossa	Uganda	1 July 2012	11 March 2018	
Margaret M. deGuzman	United States	22 December 2021	In office	
José R. de Prada Solaesa	Spain	1 July 2012	In office	
Ben Emmerson	United Kingdom	1 July 2012	19 July 2019	
Christoph Flügge	Germany	1 July 2012	7 January 2019	
Graciela Gatti Santana	Uruguay	1 July 2012	In office	
Burton Hall	Bahamas, The	1 July 2012	In office	
Claudia Hoefer	Germany	21 February 2019	In office	
Elizabeth Ibanda-Nahamya	Uganda	19 March 2018	5 January 2023	
Vagn Joensen	Denmark	1 July 2012	In office	
Gberdao Gustave Kam	Burkina Faso	1 July 2012	17 February 2021	
Liu Daqun	China	1 July 2012	In office	
Joseph Masanche	Tanzania	1 July 2012	In office	
Theodor Meron	United States	1 July 2012	17 November 2021	
Bakone Justice Moloto	South Africa	1 July 2012	30 June 2018	
Lydia N. Mugambe Ssali	Uganda	30 May 2023	5 May 2025	
Lee G. Muthoga	Kenya	1 July 2012	In office	
Aminatta Lois Runeni N'gum	Gambia, The	1 July 2012	In office	
Prisca Matimba Nyambe	Zambia	1 July 2012	In office	
Alphons M.M. Orie	Netherlands	1 July 2012	In office	
Seymour Panton	Jamaica	28 April 2016	In office	
Seon Ki Park	Korea, South	1 July 2012	In office	
Mparany Mamy Richard Rajohnson	Madagascar	1 July 2012	2 October 2018	
Mahandrisoa Edmond Randrianirina	Madagascar	29 January 2019	4 October 2023	
Patrick Lipton Robinson	Jamaica	1 July 2012	17 November 2015	
Ivo Nelson de Caires Batista Rosa	Portugal	1 July 2012	In office	
Fatimata Sanou Touré	Burkina Faso	12 August 2021	In office	
William H. Sekule	Tanzania	1 July 2012	In office	

== See also ==
- International Criminal Court
