= Moloto =

Moloto is a South African surname. Notable people with the surname include:

- Bakone Justice Moloto (born 1944), South African lawyer and judge
- Lebogang Moloto (born 1990), South African soccer player
- Sello Moloto (born 1964), South African politician
- Trott Moloto (born 1956), South African soccer coach

== Other uses ==
- R573 (Moloto Road), a road in South Africa
