= Frederik Harhoff =

Danish jurist (born 1949)

Frederik Harhoff (born 27 May 1949) is a Danish jurist. He served as an ad litem judge for the International Criminal Tribunal for the former Yugoslavia from 9 January 2007 to 28 August 2013.

He graduated from Herlufsholm College in 1969 and received his LL.D from the University of Copenhagen in 1993 where he worked as an assistant professor of International Law in 1985 and in 2002 as a senior lecturer. In October 2002, he became Senior Legal Officer in Chambers at the ICTY.

After acquittals of mid-level Serbian suspects in war crimes trials, Harhoff circulated a letter to colleagues stating that the higher bar for convictions in this case was established by ICTY Chief Justice Theodor Meron, and strongly hinted that Meron was acting on behalf of the U.S. and Israel in enacting the policy (Harhoff later said that he had erred in not including Russia, France and China amongst countries that would actively seek higher standards for war crimes because all three countries were involved in controversial military operations at the time). The Harhoff letter was highly controversial when it was leaked to the press, and Harhoff was disqualified from a separate war crimes trial for being set on conviction regardless of evidence, later departing the ICTY when his term of office was not renewed there.
