= Carmel Agius =

Maltese judge and lawyer (born 1945)

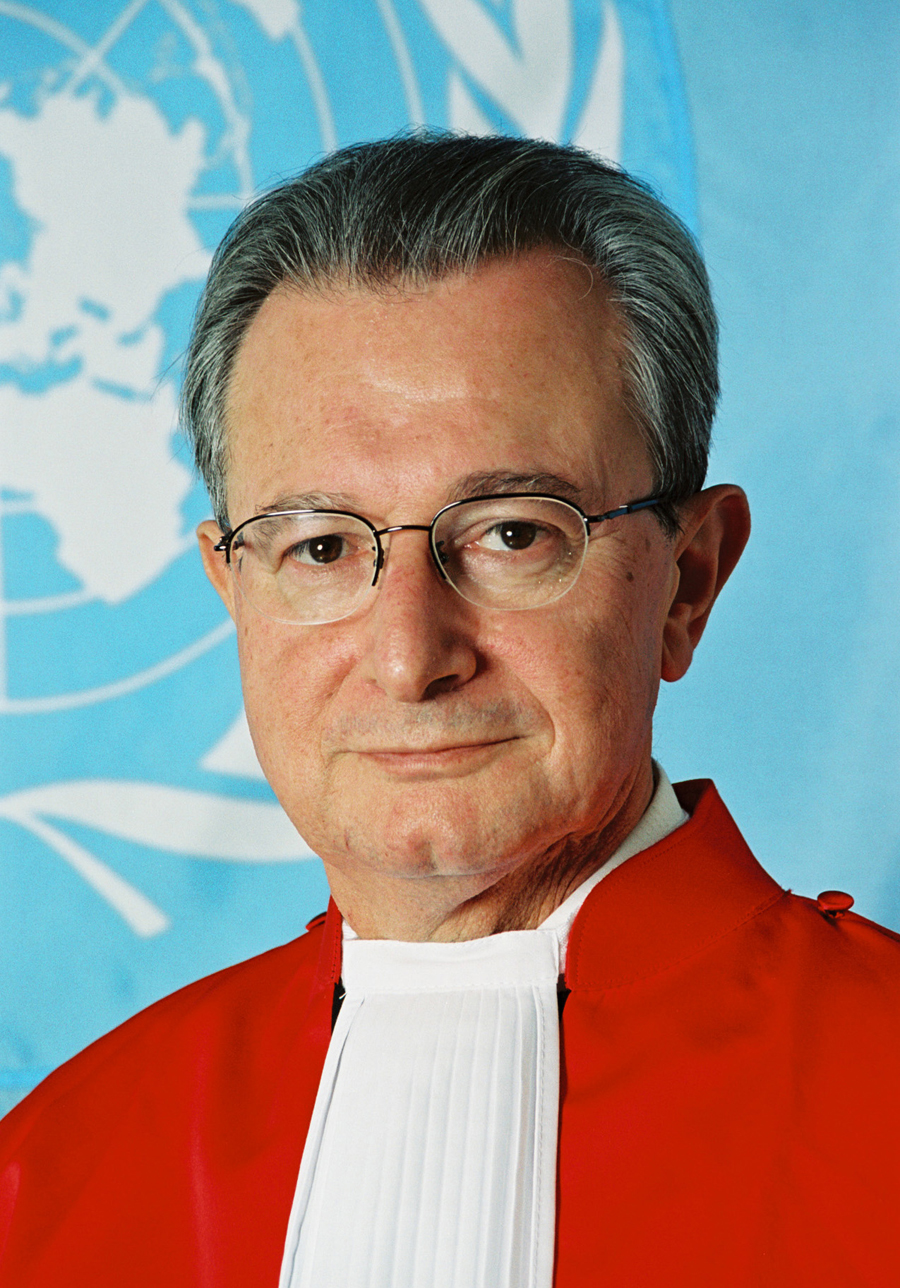
- Agius in 2014

Judge of the International Residual Mechanism for Criminal Tribunals
- Incumbent
- Assumed office 1 July 2012

President of the International Residual Mechanism for Criminal Tribunals
- In office 19 January 2019 – 30 June 2022
- Preceded by: Theodor Meron
- Succeeded by: Graciela Gatti Santana

President of the International Criminal Tribunal for the former Yugoslavia
- In office 17 November 2015 – 31 December 2017
- Preceded by: Theodor Meron
- Succeeded by: office abolished

Vice-President of the International Criminal Tribunal for the former Yugoslavia
- In office 17 November 2011 – 17 November 2015
- Preceded by: O-Gon Kwon
- Succeeded by: Liu Daqun

Judge of the International Criminal Tribunal for the former Yugoslavia
- In office 14 March 2001 – 31 December 2017

Personal details
- Born: 18 August 1945 (age 80) Sliema, Malta
- Education: University of Malta

Carmel Agius (born 18 August 1945, in Sliema, Malta) is a Maltese judge who served as a judge of the International Criminal Tribunal for the former Yugoslavia from 2001 to 2017 and its president from 2015 to 2017. He has also served as a judge of the International Residual Mechanism for Criminal Tribunals since 2012 and its president from 2019 to 2022.

== Early life and education ==
Agius was born on 8 August 1945, in Sliema, Malta. He graduated from the University of Malta with a Bachelor of Arts in English, Italian and Economics in 1964, a diploma of notary in 1968 and as a Doctor of Laws (LL.D) in 1969.

== Career ==
Agius was called to the bar in 1970. For 7 years, he worked in private practice primarily on civil and commercial litigation, advising the Times of Malta and Bank of Valletta. He was appointed a magistrate in 1977 and a judge of the superior courts in 1982. He served on the court of appeal and constitutional court of Malta, and was acting chief justice on several occasions. He retired from the Maltese judiciary in August 2010.

From 1996 to 1998, Agius represented the government of Malta at the meetings of the United Nations preparatory committee for a permanent international criminal court. In 1998, he headed the delegation of Malta at the Rome diplomatic conference and signed the Rome Statute on behalf of Malta. He also headed the Maltese delegations at the United Nations Commission on Crime Prevention and Criminal Justice and the United Nations Congress on Crime Prevention and the Treatment of Offenders until 2000. From 1999 to 2008, he was a member of the Permanent Court of Arbitration.

In 2001, Agius was elected as a judge of the International Criminal Tribunal for the former Yugoslavia (ICTY). As a trial chamber judge, he presided over major cases, such as the multi-accused trial of Vujadin Popović and others for the Srebrenica massacre. In 2010, he was appointed to the appeals chamber for the ICTY and the International Criminal Tribunal for Rwanda. He was the vice-president of the ICTY from 2011 to 2015 and its final president from 2015 to 2017.

Agius has been a judge of the International Residual Mechanism for Criminal Tribunals since its commencement in 2012, serving as its president from 2019 to 2022.

== Honours ==
In 2015, Agius was appointed an officer of the National Order of Merit of Malta.
