= List of ambassadors of China to Jamaica =

The ambassador of China to Jamaica is the official representative of the People's Republic of China to Jamaica.

== List of representatives ==
Name (English)	Name (Chinese)	Tenure begins	Tenure ends	Note
Lu Defang	路德芳	March 1973	July 1973	Chargé d'affaires
Li Chao	李超	July 1973	10 November 1976	
Wang Chongli	王崇理	March 1977	3 June 1983	
Gao Jie	高杰	9September 1983	September 1984	
Wu Jiaxuan	吴甲选	May 1986	May 1988	
Yu Mingsheng	喻明生	May 1989	13 October 1992	
Wang Jianli	王建立	November 1992	31 August 1995	
Li Xiangyang	李尚胜	September 1995	January 1999	
Liu Daqun	刘大群	January 1999	31 August 1995	
Guo Chongli	郭崇立	July 2000		
Zhao Zhenyu	赵振宇	April 2003	November 2006	
Chen Jinghua	陈京华	November 2006	April 2011	
Zheng Qingdian	郑清典	May 2010	September 2013	
Dong Xiaojun	董晓军	September 2013	November 2015	
Niu Qingbao	牛清报	December 2015	February 2018	
Tian Qi	田琦	March 2018	28 March 2022	
Chen Daojiang	陈道江	May 2022		

== See also ==
- China–Jamaica relations
