= Mohammad Amin El Mahdi =

Chief Justice of the Egyptian Council of State

Mohammad Amin El Mahdi (born November 23, 1936) is the Chief Justice of the Egyptian Council of State, and one of the international judges who served at the International Criminal Tribunal for the former Yugoslavia.
