= Elizabeth Ibanda-Nahamya =

Ugandan lawyer and judge

- Born: 16 February 1952; Uganda
- Died: 5 January 2023 (aged 70); Netherlands
- Citizenship: Uganda
- Education: Makerere University (Bachelor of Laws); Law Development Centre (Diploma in Legal Practice); University of New Haven (Master of Laws)
- Occupations: Lawyer, judge
- Known for: Law
- Title: Judge of the Mechanism for International Criminal Tribunals

Elizabeth Ibanda-Nahamya was a Ugandan lawyer and judge, who, on 22 March 2018, was appointed Judge of the Mechanism for International Criminal Tribunals (MICT). The appointment by António Guterres, the Secretary General of the United Nations, was in replacement to the MICT, following the resignation of Judge Solomy Balungi Bossa, who was elected to the International Criminal Court. Before that, she sat on the High Court of Uganda, where she was assigned to the International Crimes Division of that court.

== Background and education ==
She graduated from the Faculty of Law of Makerere University, Uganda's largest and oldest public university, with a Bachelor of Laws. She then obtained a Diploma in Legal Practice by the Law Development Centre in Kampala, Uganda's capital city. She also holds a Master of Laws from the University of New Haven, in the West Haven, Connecticut, United States. She has undertaken several postgraduate courses, including one at the International Development Law Organization, in Rome, Italy in 1992.

== Career ==
During the process of creating Uganda's 1995 Constitution, Ibanda-Nahamya was a researcher for the Constituent Assembly. She also served as a legal adviser to the Constituent Assembly Women Caucus. She also worked as researcher at the Uganda Ministry of Justice and Constitutional Affairs, where she participated in drafting of the Parliamentary Election Bill and the Presidential Election Bill. In 1993, se served as a legal consultant at the Uganda Ministry of Finance.

She has served as a judge on the Special Court for Sierra Leone, from 2004 until 2008 and the International Criminal Tribunal for Rwanda, from 1996 until 2004.

Justice Nahamya has also lectured at Ahmadu Bello University, in Zaria, Nigeria and at the National University of Lesotho, in Maseru, Lesotho. She has also consulted with the World Bank and the Commonwealth Secretariat.

== See also ==
- Julia Sebutinde
- Monica Mugenyi
- Catherine Bamugemereire
- Commonwealth Secretariat
