= Alphons Orie =

Dutch jurist (born 1947)

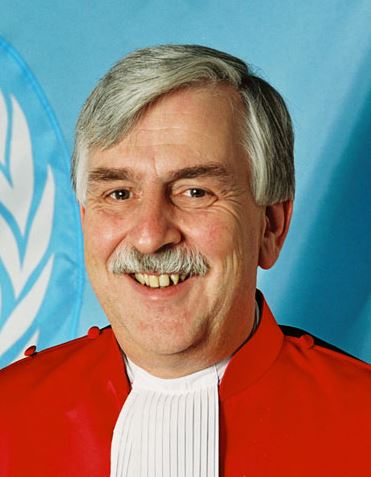
- Orie in 2014

Judge at the International Residual Mechanism for Criminal Tribunals
- Incumbent
- Assumed office 1 July 2012

Judge at the International Criminal Tribunal for the former Yugoslavia
- In office 17 November 2001 – 31 December 2017

Personal details
- Born: 23 November 1947 (age 78) Groningen, The Netherlands
- Education: Leiden University

Alphonsus "Alphons" Martinus Maria Orie (born 23 November 1947) is a Dutch jurist specialising in criminal law and a former judge at the International Criminal Tribunal for the former Yugoslavia (ICTY), who presided over many Trial Chamber cases at the ICTY.

== Biography ==
Alphons Orie was born in Groningen and studied law and graduated from Leiden University in 1971. From 1971 to 1980, he worked there in the Faculty of Law as researcher and lecturer for criminal law. He was admitted to the Bar of the Supreme Court of the Netherlands in The Hague in 1980.

Orie specialised in International Criminal Law cases (extraterritorial jurisdiction, extradition, judicial cooperation, transfer of prisoners) and cases before the Supreme Court of the Netherlands. He was a member of the Tadić defence team before the ICTY in 1995–1997. He served in various functions at his Bar and at the National Bar of the Netherlands.

In 1997, he was appointed Judge in the Supreme Court of the Netherlands, where he served until 2001. He served during those years also as a crown-appointed member of the disciplinary Court of Appeal for the Dutch Bar. In 2001, he was elected Judge at the ICTY. He is Presiding Judge of Trial Chamber I. He further presided over the Referral Bench, referring cases back to the former Yugoslavia. In 2011, he was elected Judge at the Roster of Judges of the International Residual Mechanism for Criminal Tribunals. He is also on the Disciplinary Appeals Board of the Special Tribunal for Lebanon.

Notable cases over which Orie presided include Stanislav Galić, Miodrag Jokić, Milan Babić, Momčilo Krajišnik, Ramush Haradinaj, Trial of Gotovina et al (Ante Gotovina, Mladen Markač and Ivan Čermak), Ratko Mladić and, currently, Jovica Stanišić and Franko Simatović.
