= William H. Sekule =

Judge of the International Criminal Tribunal for Rwanda

William H. Sekule (born 1944) is a Tanzanian judge who served on the International Criminal Tribunal for Rwanda (ICTR) in Arusha, Tanzania between May 1995 and March 2013. He was the presiding judge of the ICTR Trial Chamber II from June 1995 to June 1999 and from June 2001 to March 2013. He is a graduate of the University of Dar es Salaam of the University of East Africa, where he has also served on the Board of the Faculty of Law.

On 20 December 2011, was elected by the General Assembly of the United Nations as a Judge of the Mechanism for International Criminal Tribunals. His 4-year term began on 1 July 2012. Between March 2013 and April 2015 he served on the Appeals Chamber of the ICTR and the International Criminal Tribunal for the former Yugoslavia (ICTY) in The Hague.
