= Saad Saood Jan =

Pakistani judge (1931–2005)

Acting Chief Justice of Pakistan
- In office 16 April 1994 – 4 June 1994
- Preceded by: Nasim Hasan Shah
- Succeeded by: Sajjad Ali Shah

Judge, Supreme Court of Pakistan
- Incumbent
- Assumed office 1986

Judge, Lahore High Court

Personal details
- Born: 1931
- Died: 21 July 2005 (aged 73–74) Lahore, Pakistan
- Cause of death: Complications of diabetes

Saad Saood Jan (1931 – 21 July 2005) was a Pakistani jurist who served as a judge of the Supreme Court of Pakistan and twice as its acting Chief Justice. He also served as a judge of the International Criminal Tribunal for the former Yugoslavia (ICTY) from 1996 to 1998.

== Career ==
=== Government service ===
Prior to his judicial career, Jan served as Joint Secretary of the Ministry of Law and as Secretary to the Parliamentary Affairs Division.

=== Judicial career ===
Jan served as a judge of the Lahore High Court before his appointment to the Supreme Court of Pakistan in 1986. He twice served as acting Chief Justice of Pakistan. On the retirement of Chief Justice Nasim Hasan Shah in April 1994, Jan was the most senior judge of the Supreme Court and was expected to succeed to the position under established convention; however, Prime Minister Benazir Bhutto bypassed him and appointed Sajjad Ali Shah as Chief Justice. Jan served as acting Chief Justice from 16 April 1994 to 4 June 1994.

Jan was a member of the National Group of the Permanent Court of Arbitration at The Hague. In September 1996, the United Nations appointed him as a judge of the International Criminal Tribunal for the former Yugoslavia, where he succeeded Rustam S. Sidhwa. He served on the tribunal until November 1998.

== Death ==
Jan died in Lahore on 21 July 2005 after a prolonged illness arising from diabetes. Chief Justice of Pakistan Iftikhar Muhammad Chaudhry conveyed condolences to the family and attended the funeral in Lahore, where he also laid a wreath at the grave.

Legal offices
Preceded by Nasim Hasan Shah	Acting Chief Justice of Pakistan; 16 April 1994 – 4 June 1994	Succeeded by Sajjad Ali Shah
