= John Hocking =

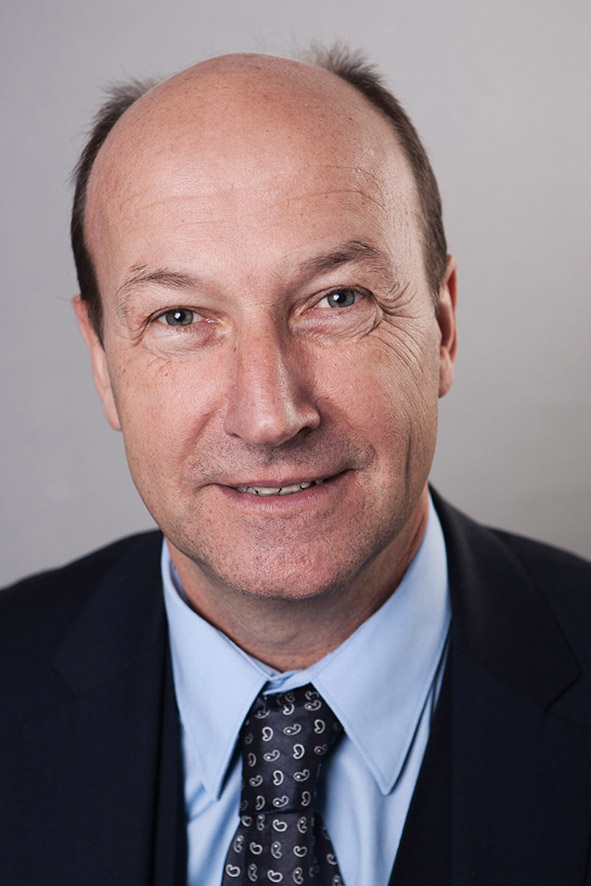

Assistant Secretary-General, Registrar, International Criminal Tribunal for the former Yugoslavia
- In office 15 May 2009 – 31 December 2017
- Preceded by: Hans Holthuis

Assistant Secretary-General, Registrar, Mechanism for International Criminal Tribunals
- In office January 2012 – 31 December 2016
- Succeeded by: Olufemi Elias

Personal details
- Born: John Frederick Hocking; 6 August 1957 (age 68); Melbourne, Australia

John Hocking (born 6 August 1957) of Australia is the United Nations Assistant Secretary-General, Registrar of the International Criminal Tribunal for the former Yugoslavia (ICTY). He served concurrently as the Registrar of the Mechanism for International Criminal Tribunals (UNMICT) from January 2012 until December 2016.

== Biography ==
United Nations Secretary-General Ban Ki-moon appointed Hocking for two terms, first on 15 May 2009 and again on 15 May 2013, to head the Registry of the ICTY, a neutral organ of the Tribunal which provides legal, diplomatic and administrative support to Judges, Prosecution and Defence. He was appointed for a third term by Secretary-General António Guterres on 15 May 2017 to support the completion of the Tribunal's work until its closure on 31 December 2017.

The United Nations Secretary-General Ban Ki-moon also appointed Hocking on 18 January 2012 as the first Registrar of the Mechanism for International Criminal Tribunals and entrusted him with its effective start-up.

Hocking joined the ICTY in 1997 as the legal officer coordinator on the ICTY's first multi-accused proceedings, the Celebici case. He subsequently served as Senior Legal Officer for the common Appeals Chambers of the ICTY and the International Criminal Tribunal for Rwanda. He was the ICTY Deputy Registrar from 2004 to 2009.

Prior to his engagement with the United Nations, he held legal and policy adviser positions internationally and domestically, including with the Organisation for Economic Co-operation and Development (OECD) in Paris, the Australian Government's national multicultural television and radio broadcaster, the Special Broadcasting Service, the British Film Institute in London and the Australian Film Commission. In his early career, Hocking served as the legal associate to Justice Michael Kirby, former Judge of the High Court of Australia, and to London-based human rights lawyer Geoffrey Robertson Q.C.

Hocking has been called to the bar at Lincoln's Inn, London, and has been admitted as a barrister/solicitor with the Supreme Court of Victoria and Supreme Court of New South Wales in Australia. He holds a Master of Law with merit from the University of London (London School of Economics and Political Science), a Bachelor of Law from the University of Sydney, and a Bachelor of Science from Monash University in Melbourne, Australia. He studied at the Harvard Kennedy School of Government.
