= Trial of Ratko Mladić =

War crimes trial at The Hague, Netherlands

The Prosecutor v. Ratko Mladić was a war crimes trial before the International Criminal Tribunal for the former Yugoslavia (ICTY) in The Hague, Netherlands, concerning crimes committed during the Bosnian War by Ratko Mladić in his role as a general in the Yugoslav People's Army and the Chief of Staff of the Army of Republika Srpska.

Judge Alphons Orie of the Netherlands presided over the case, with two assisting judges, Bakone Justice Moloto of South Africa and Christoph Flügge of Germany. Proceedings began on 3 June 2011 with a listing of the charges against Mladić, which included violations of the laws or customs of war, genocide, and crimes against humanity particularly in connection with the Srebrenica massacre and Siege of Sarajevo.

The verdict was delivered on 22 November 2017. Mladić was convicted of 10 of the 11 charges and sentenced to life imprisonment. Mladić was planned to present his appeal in March 2020, but it was postponed due to the COVID-19 pandemic. The first appeal hearings were held on 25 and 26 August 2020 and on 8 June 2021, Mladić's final appeal was rejected, 4–1.

== Arrest ==
Ratko Mladić was arrested on 26 May 2011 in Lazarevo, near Zrenjanin in the Banat region of Vojvodina, an autonomous province in the north of Serbia, at the house of his cousin Branislav Mladić, at the Ul. Vuka Karadžića 2. Branislav had been under surveillance for at least two months.

The arrest was carried out by two dozen Serbian special police officers wearing black uniforms and masks, and sporting no insignia. Upon surrendering two pistols he was carrying to the arresting police officers, Mladić was taken to Belgrade as part of the extradition process. After initial uncertainty as to the identity of the arrested man, then Serbian President Boris Tadić confirmed that it was Mladić at a press conference and announced that the process of extraditing him to the ICTY was under way. Mladić had been using the pseudonym "Milorad Komadić" while in hiding.

Mladić was not wearing a beard or any disguise. His appearance reportedly showed he had "aged considerably", and one of his arms was paralyzed due to a series of strokes.

Following his arrest, Mladić appeared before the Belgrade Higher Court to establish whether he was fit to be extradited to the Hague. Judge Milan Dilparić suspended interrogation due to Mladić's poor health. His lawyer Miloš Šaljić said that his poor health prevented him from properly communicating. He was allegedly unable to confirm his personal data, but attempted to talk to the prosecutors on several occasions, especially to Deputy War Crimes Prosecutor Bruno Vekarić. However, the court ruled that he was fit to be extradited on 27 May. According to the Serbian Health Ministry, a team of prison doctors described his health as stable following checkups. Mladić was also visited in prison by Health Minister Zoran Stanković, a former friend.

=== Reactions ===
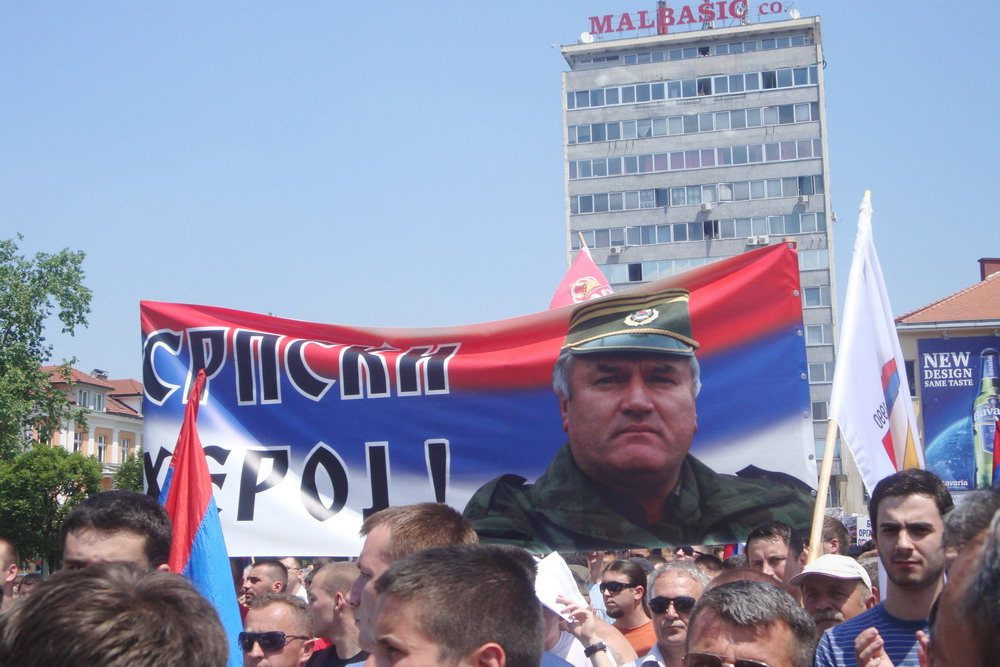
Supporters of Mladić rallying in Banja Luka

Following the arrest, Serbian authorities tightened security and banned public gatherings throughout the country.

The Serbian Radical Party praised Mladić as a "hero" and described his arrest as "one of the hardest moments in Serbian history." The far-right group 1389 called his arrest a "treason."

In Novi Sad, hundreds of demonstrators attempted to break into the headquarters of the ruling Democratic Party but were blocked by riot policemen, who injured two protesters. In Lazarevo, residents expressed support for Mladić to the media, waved Serbian and Russian flags, put up a banner of support at the entrance, blocked the road with a trailer, chanted, stopped people from taking pictures of Mladić's house and told journalists to leave. Serbian police placed the house under guard and arrested a demonstrator.

Serb demonstrators showed their support for Mladić in the Republika Srpska region of Bosnia and Herzegovina in Pale, the administrative center of Republika Srpska during the Bosnian War, and in the former capital of Banja Luka. Approximately 1,500 rallied in support of Mladić near his birthplace in Kalinovik, Bosnia and Herzegovina. Pantelija Ćurguz, President of the Association of Veterans of Republika Srpska (BORS), organized the rally. The Serbian Radical Party called a demonstration outside of the Serbian parliament and led the largest opposition party rally in support of Mladić in Belgrade. The demonstration was attended by several thousand protesters who held pictures of Mladić and Serbian Radical Party leader Vojislav Šešelj and wore Serbian nationalist emblems and slogans. A banner also demanded the ouster of President Boris Tadić. More than 3000 riot police were deployed around government buildings and Western embassies, and riot police also tried to block small groups of demonstrators from reaching the rally. The rally descended into rioting that spread throughout downtown Belgrade. Demonstrators threw stones and bottles at police, broke traffic lights, overturned garbage cans, and set off firecrackers. Riot police set up cordons and clashed with protesters at several locations in central Belgrade. Darko Mladić, Ratko Mladić's son, stated "Ratko Mladić is not a criminal, he did not order the killings. He defended his people in an honourable, fair and professional manner." Speakers from the Serbian Radical Party promoted a "Greater Serbia", which would include parts of Bosnia and the Krajina region of Croatia in addition to the extant Serbian republic. According to the interior ministry there were 111 arrests, and 32 police and 11 protesters suffered minor injuries.

== Trial ==
=== Initial proceedings ===
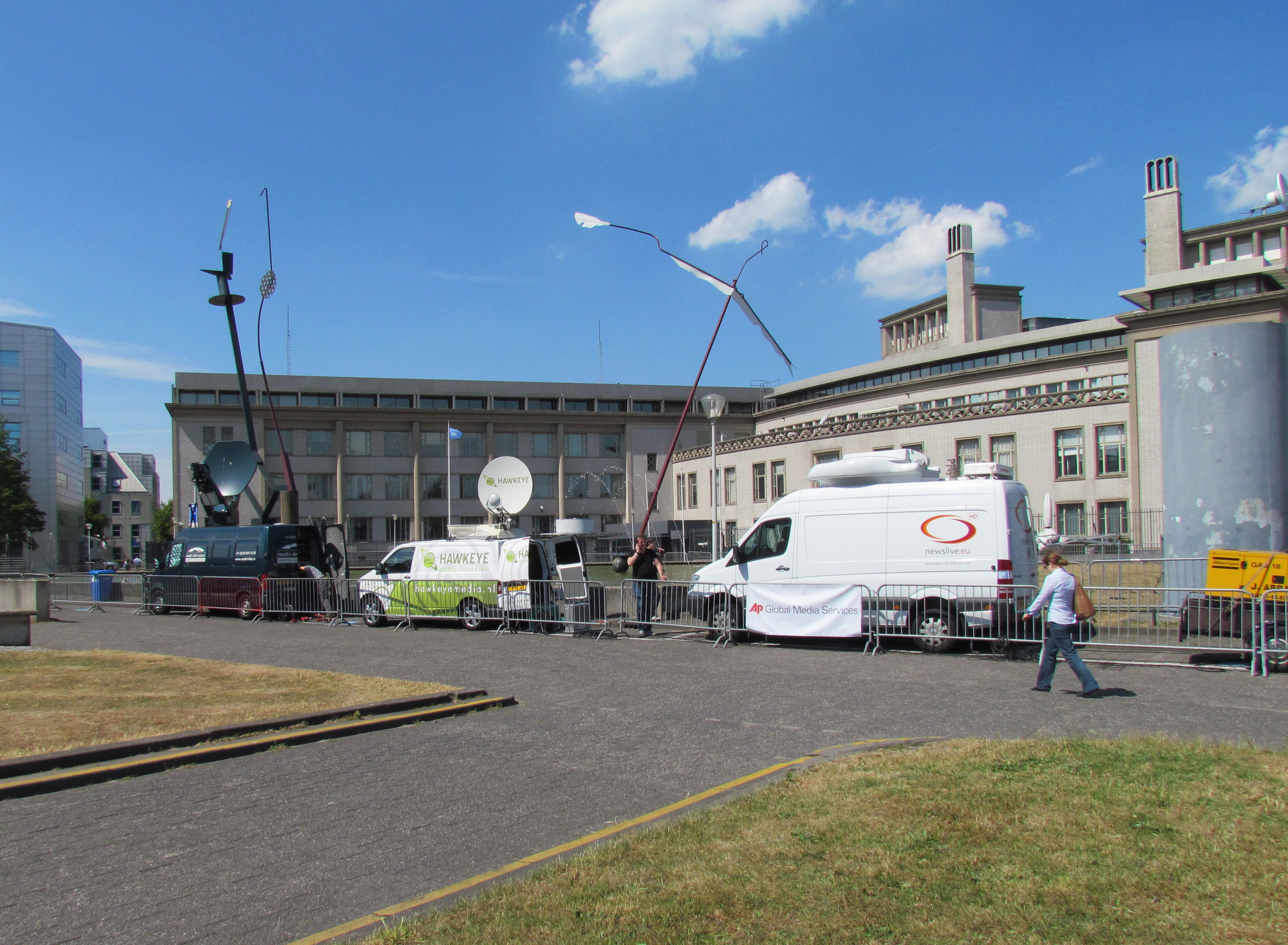
Outside broadcast vehicles outside the ICTY on the day before Mladić's arrival in the Netherlands

Mladić's trial began on 3 June 2011 with an initial hearing to list the charges against him and ask him for a plea. After judge Orie read out the charges, Mladić responded by calling them "obnoxious" and "monstrous".

The charges brought against Mladić were:

1. Genocide against a part of the Bosniak and/or Bosnian Croat national ethnical and or religious groups with the object of permanently removing Bosniaks and Bosnian Croats from the territories of Bosnia and Herzegovina claimed as Bosnian Serb territory.
2. Genocide against Bosniaks in Srebrenica by killing the men and boys of Srebrenica and forcibly removing the women, young children and some elderly.
3. Persecutions as a crime against humanity including murder, torture, beatings and rape against Bosniaks and Bosnian Croats.
4. Extermination and murder of Bosniaks and Bosnian Croats in the municipalities.
5. Murder of Bosniaks in Srebrenica.
6. Murder of civilians in Sarajevo.
7. Forcible deportation of Bosniaks, Bosnian Croats or other non-Serbs from the municipalities.
8. Forcible deportation of Bosniaks, Bosnian Croats or other non-Serbs from Srebrenica.
9. Terror and unlawful attacks against civilians.
10. Sniping and shelling against civilians in Sarajevo.
11. Hostage-taking of United Nations military observers and peacekeepers.

Mladić declined to enter a plea and the trial was adjourned until 4 July, when he made a second initial appearance and was asked to enter a plea. He was removed from the courtroom for continually interrupting the judge and appearing to attempt to communicate with the public gallery; Mladić expressed anger at being represented by an ICTY-appointed lawyer rather than his chosen lawyer, military attorney Milos Saljic, and Russian jurist Alexander Mezyayev. (The court was verifying their eligibility.) A plea of 'not guilty' was later entered by the court on his behalf.

On 17 August 2011, Mladić was admitted to a Dutch hospital, reportedly for a hernia operation.

On 10 November 2011, the medical service of the prison found that Mladić was not in a condition to follow the trial. It was decided that he needed a longer period of recovery.

=== Main hearings ===
The main hearings of the trial began on 16 May 2012. Prosecutors had 200 hours in which to make their case, presenting evidence from more than 400 witnesses, the first of whom was due to testify on 29 May. Most of the witness evidence was to be submitted in the form of written statements. Mladić refused to enter a plea to any of the charges against him.

On 17 May, the trial was adjourned indefinitely by the presiding judge due to prosecution "errors". It was reported that the prosecutor failed to disclose all of their facts to the defence. The prosecutor admitted the errors and the lawyer of Mladić asked for a six-month delay. The judge, Alphons Orie, said that the errors were still being analysed and wanted to continue the trial as soon as possible. On 10 April 2013, one of the survivors testified about the July 1995 massacre of almost 8,000 men and boys in Srebrenica in eastern Bosnia. Mladić was removed from the courtroom after muttering during the testimony. Prosecutors said that the Srebrenica testimony was expected to last several months. Mladić refused to testify at the trial of his superior, Radovan Karadžić, despite a subpoena from the ICC as he called the court "satanic" and added that "I do not want to testify and refuse to testify for reasons of my health and that it would prejudice my own case."

=== Verdict ===
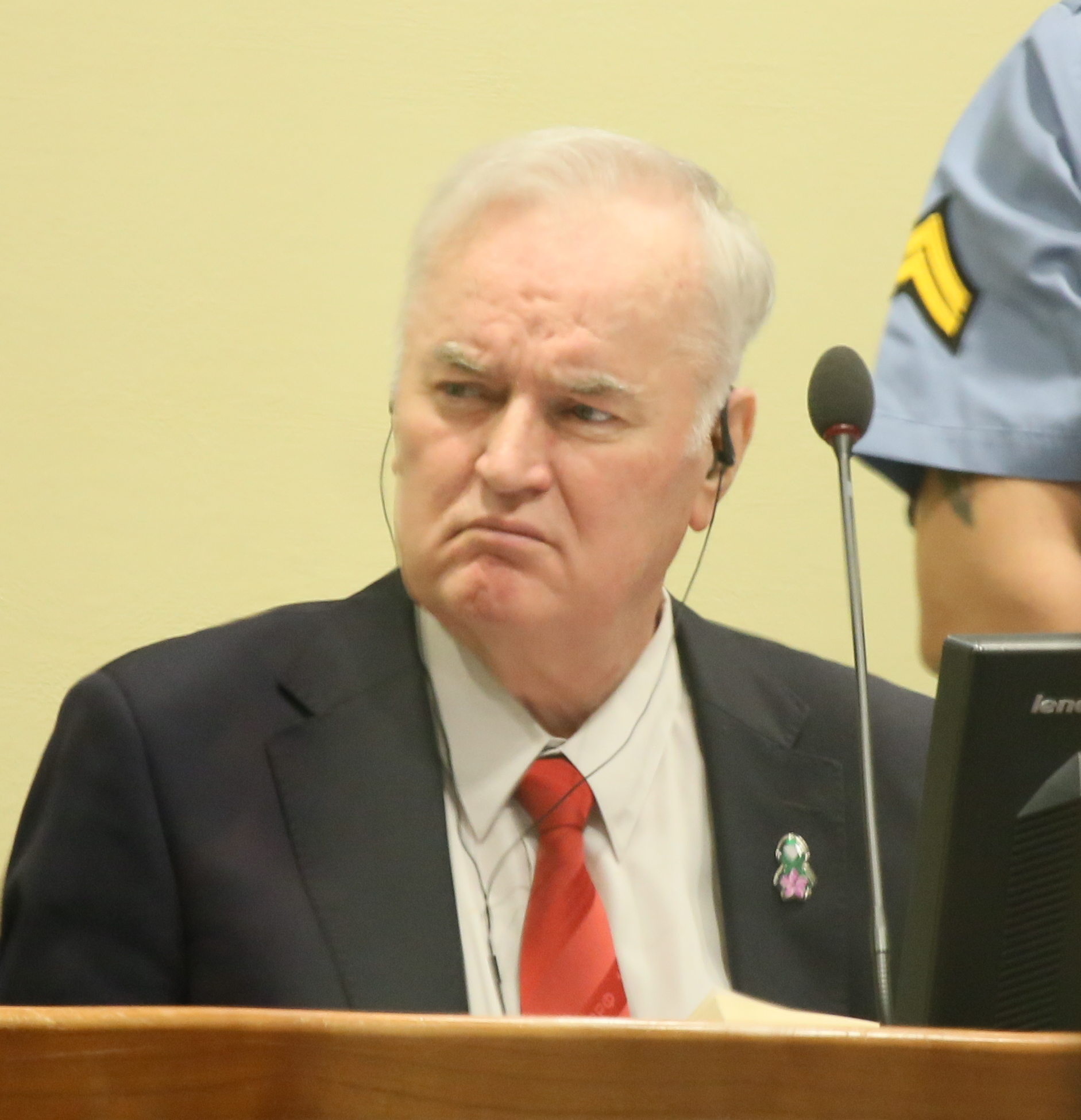
Ratko Mladić at the trial judgement, 22 November 2017

The court's verdicts were made on 22 November 2017. Mladić's lawyers attempted to delay proceedings, arguing that Mladić's blood pressure was too high to continue, but this was dismissed by the judges. Mladić could then be heard shouting obscenities, calling the court liars and hypocrites who chose to "try him of all whilst crimes are happening in Asia and Africa" all whilst referring to NATO, "You [sic] make wars all around the world." Following this, Mladic was removed from the courtroom. As he was escorted out of the courtroom, he shouted further profanities calling the judges "sons of junkie whores". Eventually, verdicts were read out in his absence.

Mladić was found guilty of 10 of the 11 charges, being acquitted of the charge of genocide in 1992 (the first item on the list above). He was sentenced to life imprisonment.

Mladić had the right to an appeal of the judgement, which would be heard by the International Residual Mechanism for Criminal Tribunals (MITC). Current practice is for prisoners to be eligible for (but not entitled to) release after serving two-thirds of the life sentence (45 years) imposed by the ICTY, which for Mladić would have meant an age of 99 years.

=== Appeal hearings ===
Despite COVID-19 setbacks, the first appeal hearings were held on 25 and 26 August 2020. On 3 September 2020, the five judge panel representing the MITC's Appeals Chamber voted 4–1 to reject Mladic's request for future hospitalization outside his Hague detention center. On 8 June 2021, Mladić's final appeal was rejected, 4–1, and Mladić spent the rest of his life in prison until his death on 27 August 2026.
