= Wang Tieya =

Chinese jurist (1913–2003)

Wang Tieya (simplified Chinese: 王铁崖; traditional Chinese: 王鐵崖; pinyin: Wáng Tiěyá; 6 July 1913 – 12 January 2003) was a Chinese jurist and former judge of the International Criminal Tribunal for the Former Yugoslavia.

== Education ==
Wang Tieya was educated at Fudan University, Tsinghua University and the London School of Economics.

== Career ==
Following the communist victory in 1949, Wang Tieya became one of the leading authorities on international law in the People's Republic of China, along with Li Haopei, one of his classmates in London. Wang was legal advisor to the PRC delegation to the United Nations in 1950 and the Third United Nations Conference on the Law of the Sea in 1979.

Wang Tieya commenced his career as a Professor of International Law at the National Wuhan University (1940-1942) and National Central University (1942-1946). In 1946, he relocated to Beijing University, where he remained until 1997. During that time, he was Chairman of the Political Science Department (1947-1952), and Head of the Section on International Law at the Faculty of Law (1956-1983). In 1983 Wang became the founding Director of the International Law Institute of Beijing University.

Following the Open Door Policy in China, Wang Tieya was feted abroad. He was a visiting scholar at Columbia Law School (1980-1989), visiting professor at The Hague Academy of International Law (1984), and also taught at the University of British Columbia (1988), and the University of California (1989). Wang became a member of the Permanent Court of Arbitration. He was also a member and then honorary member of l’Institut de Droit International and a fellow of the World Academy of Art and Science.

For many years he was involved in the Chinese Yearbook of International Law, and also oversaw the publication of the English language Chinese Journal of International Law in 2002.

Wang was elected in 1997 as a Judge of the International Criminal Tribunal for the Former Yugoslavia. In March 2000, he resigned for reasons of ill-health. After almost 20 months of hospitalisation, Wang died in a hospital in Beijing on 12 January 2003. His funeral was held five days later at Babaoshan Revolutionary Cemetery, a venue normally reserved for state officials. He was survived by his wife and three daughters.

Upon learning of the death of Judge Wang Tieya, the President of the International Criminal Tribunal for the Former Yugoslavia, Judge Claude Jorda, expressed his "great sadness at the loss of a distinguished colleague who will be remembered as a learned lawyer and a wise Judge. He was also a dedicated colleague and a gentle man who brought to the bench his great experience in the field of international law".
