= Christoph Flügge =

German jurist and judge (born 1947)

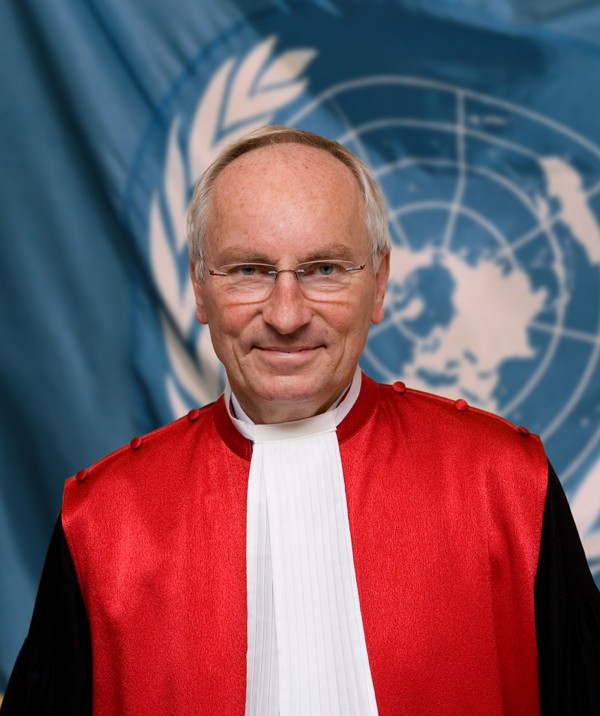

Permanent Judge at the International Criminal Tribunal for the former Yugoslavia
- In office 18 September 2008 – 31 December 2017
- Appointed by: Ban Ki-moon

Personal details
- Born: 14 July 1947 (age 79)
- Education: Free University of Berlin, University of Bonn
- Profession: Lawyer, public prosecutor, civil servant, judge

Christoph Flügge (born 14 July 1947) is a German jurist and judge. From June 2001 to February 2007, he was Secretary of State in the Department of Justice of the State of Berlin. On 18 September 2008, he was appointed permanent judge at the International Criminal Tribunal for the former Yugoslavia (ICTY). As a result of controversial comments made in 2009, some genocide scholars and victims' groups have accused him of genocide denial in relation to the Bosnian Genocide and more specifically the Srebrenica genocide. He served as a judge in the war crimes trial against Radovan Karadžić, but was removed from the case. In 2011, he was appointed as a judge in the trial of Ratko Mladić, but there have been calls for his resignation from several Bosnian victims' groups.

== Career ==
Flügge studied law from 1967 to 1973 at the Free University of Berlin and the University of Bonn. He graduated with the first state exam in 1973 and the second in 1976. He worked as an assistant for an SPD Member of Parliament during his studies from 1969 to 1971, and was employed at a West Berlin law firm in 1973.

In 1976 he became secretary to Senator Kurt Neubauer (SPD). In 1977 he became a public prosecutor, and from 1978, he worked in the Berlin Department of Justice. He was appointed as criminal judge at the Berlin Amtsgericht in 1983. In 1989, he returned to the Berlin Department of Justice. In 2001, he was appointed Secretary of State by Senator Wolfgang Wieland. He was dismissed as Secretary by Senator Gisela von der Aue in February 2007.

At the proposal of the Federal Ministry of Justice of Germany, he was appointed as permanent judge at the ICTY by UN Secretary-General Ban Ki-moon in 2008.

He was a member of the trial chamber in the case against Serbia's former interior minister Vlastimir Đorđević and of the trial chamber in the case against Radovan Karadžić; however, he was removed from the latter case after controversial comments. It is not clear why he was removed from the case. On 27 May 2011, he was appointed as one of the three judges of the trial chamber in the case against Ratko Mladić.

In January 2019, Flügge resigned from his position at the ICTY, citing threats from both the Turkish and the US government, which were showing that they wouldn't accept the authority of an international court.

He is a member of the Social Democratic Party of Germany.

== Accusations of genocide denial ==
In 2009, Christoph Flügge made controversial public comments in an interview with Der Spiegel that were criticized for denying the Bosnian Genocide. Flügge claimed the term genocide was "unnecessary" while describing the Srebrenica genocide, which has been determined to be genocide by the United Nations and the ICTY itself. Several genocide scholars protested against his comments, accusing him of denial of the genocide in Bosnia and Herzegovina. The Congress of North American Bosniaks demanded that Flügge be removed from his position as judge, stating that the organisation was "shocked and confounded" by his statements "in which he openly questions the Srebrenica genocide", accusing him of genocide denial. The organisation demanded "a complete retraction of the statement" and "a full apology to all the victims of the genocide who have been hurt by this statement, at a time when they are getting ready to commemorate the 14th anniversary of the genocide and bury more victims who are still being identified from the many mass graves".

Flügge was removed from the Radovan Karadžić case following the protest by Bosniak victims' groups. The Congress of North American Bosniaks applauded the decision, but demanded an official apology. The organisation cited former ICTY President Theodor Meron, who stated in 2005:

"By seeking to eliminate a part of the Bosnian Muslims [Bosniaks], the Bosnian Serb forces committed genocide. They targeted for extinction the 40,000 Bosnian Muslims living in Srebrenica, a group which was emblematic of the Bosnian Muslims in general.

They stripped all the male Muslim prisoners, military and civilian, elderly and young, of their personal belongings and identification, and deliberately and methodically killed them solely on the basis of their identity. The Bosnian Serb forces were aware, when they embarked on this genocidal venture, that the harm they caused would continue to plague the Bosnian Muslims.

The Appeals Chamber states unequivocally that the law condemns, in appropriate terms, the deep and lasting injury inflicted, and calls the massacre at Srebrenica by its proper name: genocide. Those responsible will bear this stigma, and it will serve as a warning to those who may in future contemplate the commission of such a heinous act."

Following the appointment of Flügge as a judge in the Ratko Mladić case, three major associations of Muslim victims of the Bosnian Genocide—the Association of Bosnia-Herzegovina Camp Inmates, the Association of Women Victims of War, and the Movement of Mothers of Srebrenica and Žepa Enclaves—wrote a letter to the ICTY, protesting against the appointment of Flügge and accusing him of having "denied that the crime of genocide had been committed in Srebrenica". The organisations stated that Flügge has shown that he "does not deserve to be a judge with the Hague Tribunal" and that he has "demonstrated that he is prone to prejudice". The organisations were joined in their protest against Flügge by the Congress of North American Bosniaks, which criticized Flügge of his "refusal to apologize for the comments and publicly recognize the classification of Srebrenica Genocide". In a joint letter from the Congress of North American Bosniaks, the Institute for Genocide Research Canada, and the Australian Council of Bosnian Herzegovina Organizations, the organizations requested that Flügge be removed from the Mladić case, stating that the

"International Criminal Tribunal for the former Yugoslavia (ICTY) has already confirmed, in several cases including the 2007 ruling against Serbia and Montenegro, the classification of the murder of more than 8,000 Bosniaks in Srebrenica as genocide. This fact has also been recognized by organizations and governments across the world, including the U.S Congress in resolutions 199 and 134 on genocide in Bosnia-Herzegovina. Judge Flügge is therefore unable to show impartiality to the case and was in a clear violation of The Hague’s Rule 15(A). His statement also directly violated previous ICTY rulings which confirmed that the atrocities committed against Bosniaks in Srebrenica constitute genocide, in accordance with the definition from the Geneva Convention of 1949."

The organisations stated further that:

"It is unacceptable that, one day after the capture of the monstrous war criminal Ratko Mladic, the victims of genocide have to deal with a judge who does not even recognize the true nature of the atrocities that claimed the lives of their loved ones".

Despite Flügge's claim that the Srebrenica Genocide was not a genocide, Ratko Mladić has been charged by prosecutor Serge Brammertz with the crime of genocide.

== Private life ==
Flügge is married.

== Publications ==
- DDR-Strafvollzug. Recht statt Drill. In: Neue Kriminalpolitik, 1990
- Alter Geist - neue Probleme. Strafvollzug nach der Wiedervereinigung. In: Neue Kriminalpolitik, 1991
- Assessment of the Ukrainian Prison System (Lakes/Fliigge/Philip/Nestorovic-Report), Council of Europe, Strasbourg 1997 (UKR V.B. 4 [97]1)
- ... und sie bewegt sich doch. Debatte um die Todesstrafe in der Ukraine. In: ai-Journal 6/1997
- Berlin zeigt Mut zur Reform. In: Neue Kriminalpolitik, 1/1998
- Untersuchungshaftanstalten des MfS. In: Strafvollzug in den neuen Bundesländern. Kriminologische Zentralstelle, Wiesbaden 1999
- Reassessment of the Needs of the Ukrainian Prison System. Council of Europe, Strasbourg 2004 (SG/Ukraine [2003] 1REV)
