= Sharon A. Williams =

Canadian lawyer and legal scholar (1951–2016)

- Born: 1951; Wales
- Died: November 2016 (aged 64–65)
- Education: University of Exeter (LL.B.), Osgoode Hall Law School (LL.M., D.Jur.)
- Occupations: Lawyer, legal scholar, judge
- Employer: Osgoode Hall Law School
- Known for: Judge ad litem at the International Criminal Tribunal for the Former Yugoslavia, Member of the Permanent Court of Arbitration
- Awards: David Mundell Medal (1991), Fellow of the Royal Society of Canada (1993)

Sharon A. Williams (1951–2016) was a Canadian lawyer and legal scholar who served as a member of the Permanent Court of Arbitration at the Hague from 1991 to 1997, was a consultant to the Canadian Department of Justice on extradition matters, and was a Judge ad litem at the International Criminal Tribunal for the Former Yugoslavia from 2001 to 2003. She studied at Exeter (LL.B.) and Osgoode Hall Law School (LL.M., D.Jur.) where she was a professor of law.
