= Fausto Pocar =

Italian jurist (born 1939)

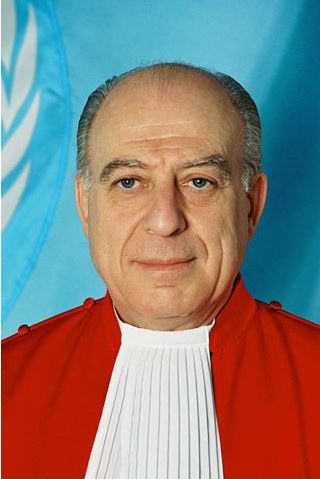
- Pocar in 2014

Judge ad hoc of the International Court of Justice
- Incumbent
- Assumed office 2017

President of the International Criminal Tribunal for the former Yugoslavia
- In office 17 November 2005 – 4 November 2008
- Preceded by: Theodor Meron
- Succeeded by: Patrick Lipton Robinson

Vice-President of the International Criminal Tribunal for the former Yugoslavia
- In office 27 February 2003 – 17 November 2005
- Preceded by: Mohamed Shahabuddeen
- Succeeded by: Kevin Parker

Judge of the International Criminal Tribunal for the former Yugoslavia
- In office 1 February 2001 – 31 December 2017
- Preceded by: Antonio Cassese

Personal details
- Born: 21 February 1939 (age 87) Milan, Italy

Fausto Pocar (born 21 February 1939) is an Italian jurist who served as a judge of the International Criminal Tribunal for the former Yugoslavia from 2000 to 2017 and its president from 2005 to 2008.

== Biography ==
He is professor emeritus of International Law at the University of Milan, where he also taught Private International Law and European Law, and where he served many years as Faculty Dean and Vice-Rector. From 1984-2000, he was an elected member of the Human Rights Committee of the United Nations, serving as the committee's chair from 1991-92.

Pocar served in the Italian delegation to the UN General Assembly in New York and to the United Nations Commission on Human Rights in Geneva several times. He also served as Italian delegate in the UNCOPUOS (UN Committee on the Peaceful Uses of Outer Space) and its Legal SubCommittee.

In 1999, he was appointed as a judge to the International Criminal Tribunal for the Former Yugoslavia (ICTY), and was Vice-President of the tribunal from November 2003 to November 2005, and President from November 2005 to November 2008. He was also a member of the Appeals Chamber of the International Criminal Tribunal for Rwanda (ICTR) from 2000 until the ICTR's closure in 2015, where he presided over many cases, including the one whereby the ICTR was closed.

In 2017, Pocar was appointed Judge ad hoc of the International Court of Justice (ICJ) in the case between Ukraine and the Russian Federation. As of 2012 Pocar is President of the International Institute of Humanitarian Law (Sanremo, Italy). Pocar is a doctor honoris causa of the University of Antwerp and of the Kennedy University of Buenos Aires. In 2014 he was made Cavaliere di Gran Croce (Great Cross Knight, the highest Italian honor) by the President of the Italian Republic.

He taught "Sistema de Derechos Humanos de las Naciones Unidas" at American University Washington College of Law’s Academy on Human Rights and Humanitarian Law as a visiting scholar in the summers of 2012-2015, and "Impunidad y justicia internacional" in the summers of 2016-2017.

== Works ==
He produced a large number of publications in the field of international law, European law, international private law, international humanitarian law and human rights. Much of his work appeared in La Comunità internazionale and Relazioni internazionali. He was editor-in-chief of the academic magazine Rivista di diritto internazionale privato e processuale and he co-wrote the Italian yearbook for International law.

His article, 'International Criminal Tribunals and Serious Violations of International Humanitarian Law against Civilians and Prisoner of War', was published in International Criminal Law and Human Rights, edited by Manoj Kumar Sinha (Manak Publications, New Delhi, 2010).
