= Graciela Gatti Santana =

Uruguayan judge (born 1945)

President of the International Residual Mechanism for Criminal Tribunals
- Incumbent
- Assumed office 1 July 2022
- Preceded by: Carmel Agius

Judge of the International Residual Mechanism for Criminal Tribunals
- Incumbent
- Assumed office 1 July 2012

Personal details
- Born: 1 June 1964 (age 62) Montevideo, Uruguay
- Education: University of the Republic of Uruguay; University of Alicante; University of Montevideo

Graciela Susana Gatti Santana (born 1 June 1964) is a Uruguayan judge who has served as a judge of the International Residual Mechanism for Criminal Tribunals since 2012 and its president since 2022.

== Early life and education ==
Gatti Santana was born on 1 June 1964, in Montevideo, Uruguay. She graduated from the University of the Republic of Uruguay as a public notary in 1987 and as a lawyer in 1988. She completed a postgraduate course in legal argumentation at the University of Alicante in 2007 and a masters in law in constitutional law and human rights from the University of Montevideo in 2018.

== Career ==
Gatti Santana practiced as a public notary and as a lawyer from 1987 to 1992, before joining the Uruguayan judiciary in 1992. For 30 years, she served on courts around the country dealing with civil, criminal, family, labour and organised crime matters, rising to become a judge of the court of appeals for criminal matters from 2016 to 2022 and president of the association of magistrates of Uruguay from 2021 to 2022.

In 2011, Gatti Santana was elected by the United Nations General Assembly as a judge of the International Residual Mechanism for Criminal Tribunals (IRMCT), where she has been a judge since its commencement in 2012. She sat in the appeals chamber in the case of former Bosnian Serb president Radovan Karadžić.

In 2022, she was appointed by the UN Secretary-General to be president of the mechanism. In 2023, she presided over the appeals following the retrial of Serbian security officials Jovica Stanišić and Franko Simatović, expanding the scope of their convictions and extending their sentences from 12 to 15 years. In 2026 she asked medical experts to assess Ratko Mladic's «current condition and options for future treatment, as well as the extent to which his life expectancy could be assessed, and whether the care he was receiving in detention was adequate».
