= Charles Sikubwabo =

Rwandan war criminal

Charles Sikubwabo was a Rwandan fugitive war criminal wanted for his role in the 1994 Rwandan genocide. He was indicted following by the United Nations' International Criminal Tribunal for Rwanda for genocide, crimes against humanity, and other violations of international humanitarian law. He served as mayor of Gishyita commune, Kibuye prefecture, from 1993 till July 1994. According to the indictment against him, Sikubwabo played an instrumental role in the murder of Tutsis in the Kibuye region during the genocide, including personally participating in killings. During this period, in contact with Clement Kayishema, Obed Ruzindana, and Aloys Ndimbati, amongst others, he facilitated the murders of Tutsis who sought refuge in the Bisesero hills. On April 30, 2024, the war crimes tribunal for Rwanda declared it had enough evidence to confirm Sikubwabo's death. He is believed to have been buried in an unmarked grave in central Africa.

== See also ==
- List of fugitives from justice who disappeared
