= Li Haopei =

Chinese jurist, diplomat and academic (1906-1997)

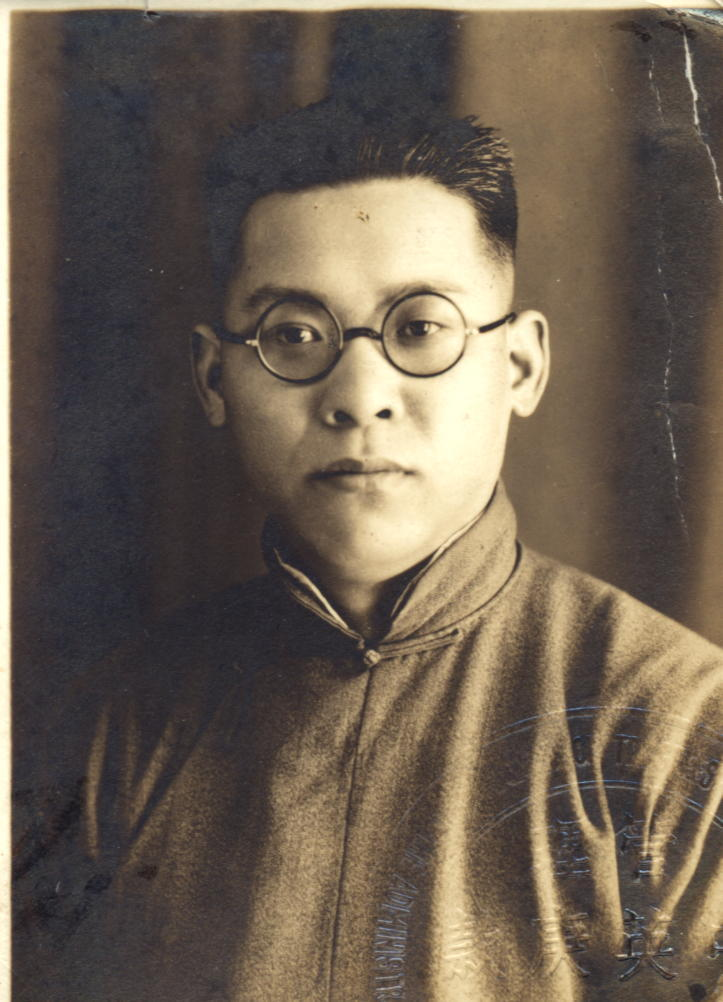

Judge of the International Criminal Tribunal for the former Yugoslavia
- In office 7 November 1993 – 6 November 1997

Member of the Permanent Court of Arbitration
- In office 1993–1997

Personal details
- Born: 6 July 1906 Shanghai
- Died: 6 November 1997 (aged 91) The Hague

Li Haopei (Chinese: 李浩培; pinyin: Lǐ Hàopéi; 6 July 1906, Shanghai – 6 November 1997, The Hague) was a Chinese jurist, diplomat and academic. He was a leading authority on international law.

== Education ==
Li attended Soochow University and received his Bachelor and Master's of laws in 1928 and 1930 respectively. In 1936 he won a scholarship and travelled to the United Kingdom to pursue advanced studies in public international law, international private law and comparative law at the London School of Economics, University of London.

== Academic and governmental career ==
Returning to China in 1939, Li became Associate Professor of Law at the National Wuhan University, at the time relocated to Leshan, Sichuan due to the Second Sino-Japanese War. Later in 1941, Li was promoted to Professor of Law and Head of the Faculty of Law. At the end of the World War II Li Haopei left for Hangzhou, where he became Professor of Law and Dean of the College of Law at the National Chekiang University.

Following the end of the Chinese Civil War in 1949, Li moved to Beijing, where he served the Communist government as an Expert Commissioner to the National Law Commission of China up to 1956. In that year, he was made Professor of International Law at the College of Foreign Relations. From 1963 to 1993, Li was concurrently Professor of International Law at Peking University and Legal Advisor to the Ministry of Foreign Affairs of the People's Republic of China (PRC). In 1979, he completed drafting the first Criminal Law of the People's Republic of China and the Law of Criminal Procedure, a key piece of legislation enacted as part of a return to legality under the Open Door Policy.

Li Haopei translated a number of works from English, German, and French, including the Napoleonic Code.

== International tribunals ==
As the PRC took a large role in international law, Li Haopei became its main representative at international conferences and tribunals. From 1993 to 1997 he served as a Member of the Permanent Court of Arbitration. In the same period, Li served as Judge at the Appeals Chamber at the International Criminal Tribunal for the Former Yugoslavia.

== Death ==
Li Haopei died in the Red Cross Hospital at the Hague on 6 November 1997. Whilst at the time Li's death was thought to be from natural causes, an investigation was opened in 2002 into his death as it was thought to be linked to the Dutch nurse Lucia de Berk. In 2010 de Berk was acquitted of all murder charges, having been found guilty at first instance. The evidence against de Berk is thought to have been based on flawed statistics.

== Family ==
His daughter Ling Yan is also a leading jurist.
