= Rustam S. Sidhwa =

Supreme Court of Pakistan judge

Rustam Sohrabji Sidhwa
- Born: September 1, 1927
- Died: March 31, 1997 (aged 69); Pakistan
- Occupations: Lawyer, judge
- Known for: One of the United Nations Judges of International Criminal Tribunal for the former Yugoslavia; Former judge of the Supreme Court of Pakistan
- Relatives: Zarnak Sidhwa (daughter-in-law)

Rustam Sohrabji Sidhwa (1 September 1927 – 31 March 1997) was a judge of the Supreme Court of Pakistan as well as one of the original eleven judges of the International Criminal Tribunal for the former Yugoslavia.

== Career ==
=== Pakistan ===
He passed the Bar in 1951 and was elevated to a judge of the Lahore High Court in 1978. Between 14 December 1989 and 31 August 1992, he served on the Supreme Court of Pakistan.

=== International Criminal Tribunal for the Former Yugoslavia ===
Sidhwa served as a judge in the Appeals Chamber of the International Criminal Tribunal for the Former Yugoslavia from 1993 until his resignation in July 1996 for health reasons. He was succeeded by Saad Saood Jan.
