= Bakone Justice Moloto =

South African former lawyer (born 1944)

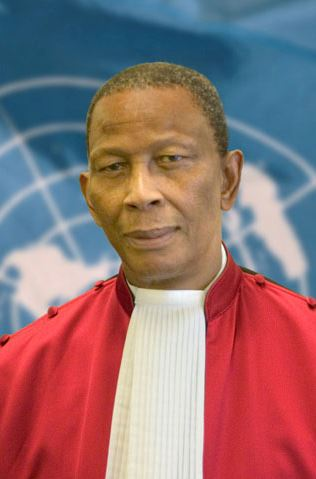
- Moloto in 2014

Judge of the International Residual Mechanism for Criminal Tribunals
- In office 1 July 2012 – 30 June 2018

Judge of the International Criminal Tribunal for the former Yugoslavia
- In office 17 November 2005 – 31 December 2017

Personal details
- Born: 26 July 1944 (age 82) South Africa
- Education: University of South Africa

Bakone Justice Moloto (born 26 July 1944) is a South African former lawyer, who served as a judge at the International Criminal Tribunal for the former Yugoslavia (ICTY) in The Hague.

== Early life and education ==
Moloto gained a degree in law from the University of South Africa.

== Career ==
For ten years until 2005, he was a judge at South Africa's Land Claims Court, hearing disputes arising from laws underpinning the country's land reform initiatives. Since 17 November 2005 he is a member of the ICTY and was one of three judges presiding over the trial of Ratko Mladić.

Moloto entered a dissenting opinion from the majority in their Judgement convicting General Momčilo Perišić at the ICTY on 6 September 2011.

He also presided over ICTY cases against Milan Martić, Rasim Delić, and the re-trial of Ramush Haradinaj, Idriz Balaj and Lahi Brahimaj.

He is a member of the Crimes Against Humanity Initiative Advisory Council, a project of the Whitney R. Harris World Law Institute at Washington University School of Law in St. Louis to establish the world's first treaty on the prevention and punishment of crimes against humanity.

He is the son of South African women's rights activist Ellen Kuzwayo.
