= Theodor Meron =

American judge and lawyer

Theodor Meron CMG
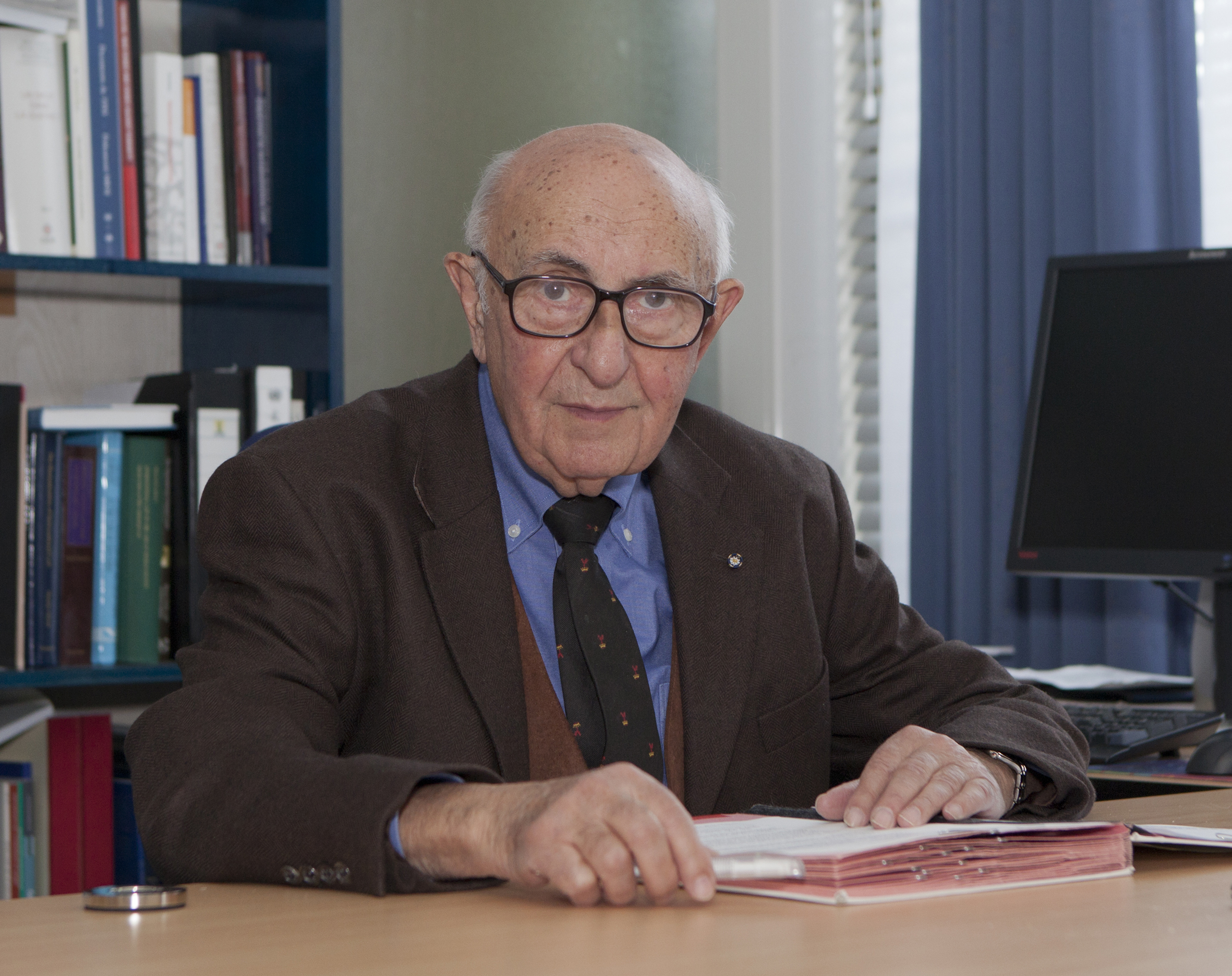

President of the International Residual Mechanism for Criminal Tribunals
- In office 1 March 2012 – 18 January 2019
- Preceded by: office established
- Succeeded by: Carmel Agius

Judge of the International Residual Mechanism for Criminal Tribunals
- In office 20 December 2011 – 17 November 2021

President of the International Criminal Tribunal for the former Yugoslavia
- In office 17 November 2011 – 16 November 2015
- Preceded by: Patrick Robinson
- Succeeded by: Carmel Agius
- In office 27 February 2003 – 17 November 2005
- Preceded by: Claude Jorda
- Succeeded by: Fausto Pocar

Judge of the International Criminal Tribunal for the former Yugoslavia
- In office 14 March 2001 – 31 December 2017

Israeli Ambassador in Canada
- In office 1971–1975
- Preceded by: Ephraim Evron
- Succeeded by: Mordechai Shalev

Legal adviser for the Israeli Ministry of Foreign Affairs
- In office 1967–1971
- Preceded by: Shabtai Rosenne
- Succeeded by: Meir Rosenne

Personal details
- Born: Kalisz, Poland
- Education: Hebrew University (MJur); Harvard University (SJD); Cambridge University

Theodor Meron is an American lawyer and judge. He served as a judge of the International Criminal Tribunal for the former Yugoslavia (ICTY), International Criminal Tribunal for Rwanda (ICTR), and the International Residual Mechanism for Criminal Tribunals (Mechanism).

He served as president of the ICTY four times (2003–2005 and 2011–2015) and inaugural President of the Mechanism for three terms (2012–2019).

== Early life and education ==
Theodor Meron was born in Kalisz, Poland, to a Jewish family. He was held in a Nazi labor camp during World War II.

In 1945, he immigrated to Mandatory Palestine. He received his legal education at the Hebrew University (M.J.), Harvard Law School (LL.M., J.S.D.) and Cambridge University (Diploma in Public International Law). He immigrated to the United States in 1978 and is a citizen of the United States.

== Legal career ==
Meron is a scholar of public international law, international humanitarian law, human rights and international criminal law. Prior to his immigration to the United States, Meron was a legal adviser of the Israeli Ministry of Foreign Affairs. Starting in 1977, he has served as a Professor of International Law at the Geneva Graduate Institute of International Studies, a visiting professor at Harvard Law School and UC Berkeley, and a Professor of International Law at New York University School of Law, where he was named the Charles L. Denison Chair at New York University School of Law in 1994. In 2000-01 he served as Counselor on International Law in the U.S. Department of State. In 2006 he was named Charles L. Denison Professor Emeritus and Judicial Fellow at New York University School of Law. He has been a visiting professor at Oxford University since 2014, a visiting fellow at Mansfield College, and an academic associate at the Bonavero Human Rights Institute.

In 1990, Meron served as a “Public Member” of the United States Delegation to the CSCE Conference on Human Dimensions in Copenhagen. In 1998, he served as a member of U.S. Delegation to the Rome Conference on the establishment of an International Criminal Court. He served on several committees of experts of the ICRC, on Internal Strife, on Environment and Armed Conflicts, and on Customary Rules of International Humanitarian Law. He co-leads the annual ICRC-NYU seminars on international humanitarian law for UN diplomats. In 2022 he was appointed Special Advisor on International Humanitarian Law to the Prosecutor of the International Criminal Court.

Meron is a member of the Institute of International Law and the Council on Foreign Relations and is a former Honorary President of the American Society of International Law. He has also served as Co-Editor-in-Chief of the American Journal of International Law. He was awarded the 2005 Rule of Law Award by the International Bar Association and the 2006 Manley O. Hudson Medal of the American Society of International Law.

He was made an Officer of the Legion of Honor by the President of the French Republic in 2007. He received the Charles Homer Haskins Prize of the American Council of Learned Societies for 2008. In 2009, Meron was elected to the American Academy of Arts and Sciences. He was awarded a LLD honoris causa by the University of Warsaw in 2011 and LLD honoris causa by the University of Calisia, (Kalisz) in 2021, and in 2017 he was made Officer of the Order of Merit of Poland. He was also named "Grand Officier" of the National Order of Merit by the President of France in 2014. For service to criminal justice and international Humanitarian Law, Queen Elizabeth II made him an Honorary Companion of "the Most Distinguished Order of St. Michael and St. George" (CMG) in 2019. That same year, he was also one of 17 honorees selected by One Young World and Vanity Fair for the inaugural Global Achievements List, cited for his contributions "for peace, justice and strong institutions" (UK March 2019 issue).

In 2024, Meron was part of an expert panel that recommended ICC chief prosecutor Karim Ahmad Khan issue arrest warrants against Israeli Prime Minister Benjamin Netanyahu, Defense Minister Yoav Gallant and three Hamas leaders (Yahya Sinwar, Mohammed Deif, Ismail Haniyeh) on suspicion of war crimes and crimes against humanity in the Gaza war.

=== Legal opinion on settlements in the occupied territories ===
After Israel's victory in the Six-Day War of June 1967, Meron, as legal counsel to the Israeli Foreign Ministry, wrote a secret memo for Prime Minister Levi Eshkol, who was considering re-establishing the Jewish settlement of Kfar Etzion, which had been destroyed by Arab forces in 1948. Meron's memo concluded that creating this new settlement in the Occupied Territories would be a violation of the Fourth Geneva Convention. Eshkol created the settlement anyway. Fifty years later, in 2017, Meron, citing decades of legal scholarship on the subject, reiterated his legal opinion regarding the illegality of Israeli settlements in the Occupied Territories.

=== Srebrenica Genocide Appeals Chamber ===
Judge Theodor Meron presided over the Appeals Chamber in the case of Radislav Krstic which confirmed that systematic murder of over 8,000 men and boys in Srebrenica constituted genocide. He visited the Srebrenica Genocide Memorial in 2004 and stated:

"...Where these requirements are satisfied, however, the law must not shy away from referring to the crime committed by its proper name. By seeking to eliminate a part of the Bosnian Muslims, the Bosnian Serb forces committed genocide. They targeted for extinction the forty thousand Bosnian Muslims living in Srebrenica, a group which was emblematic of the Bosnian Muslims in general."

== Judicial services ==
=== ICTY ===
In June 2013, Judge Frederik Harhoff of Denmark, a judge at the ICTY, circulated a letter saying that Meron had pressured other judges into acquitting Serb and Croat commanders. The letter claimed Meron had raised the bar for conviction for responsibility that senior military leaders should bear for war crimes committed by their subordinates, and prosecutors interviewed complained that a conviction has thereby become nearly impossible. The letter blamed Meron, whom it identified as an American, for the acquittals of top Serb and Croat commanders.

In August 2013, a chamber appointed by the ICTY Vice-President found by majority that Judge Harhoff had demonstrated an unacceptable appearance of bias in favour of conviction. Harhoff was therefore disqualified from the case of Vojislav Šešelj. The decision followed a defence motion seeking the disqualification of Harhoff on the basis of Judge Harhoff's letter. Following the decision on his disqualification for bias, Harhoff, who was an ad litem judge, had to leave the ICTY.

In the Judgment of the International Court of Justice of 3 February 2015, the Court, which is the principal judicial organ of the United Nations, expressed agreement with the ICTY majority judgement in the case of Ante Gotovina and Mladen Markač, which was at the center of Harhoff's criticism of Meron, who presided over the Gotovina and Markač appeal.

Theodor Meron was one of 8 judges called upon by ICC Prosecutor Karim Khan to provide advice on whether to provide arrest warrants for Israeli and Hamas leaders on charges of war crimes in May 2024. Meron, alongside the other 7 judges, advised him to provide these warrants. The panel also found reasonable evidence that both Israel and Hamas had committed war crimes, with Israel in specific using starvation as a method of warfare.

Meron has given numerous public lectures, a TEDx talk and public interviews.

== Honors ==
In 2019, Meron was appointed Honorary Companion of the Order of St Michael and St George (CMG), for services to criminal justice and international humanitarian law. On 1 April 2022 the appointment was made substantive.

He is also an officer of the French Legion of Honour, a Grand Officer of the French National Order of Merit and Officer of the Polish Order of Merit. He has honorary doctorates from the Universities of Warsaw and Calisia.

== Works ==
Meron's books include:

- Investment Insurance in International Law (Oceana-Sijthoff, 1976)
- The United Nations Secretariat (Lexington Books, 1977)
- Human Rights in International Law (Oxford University Press, 1984)
- Human Rights Law-Making in the United Nations (Oxford University Press, 1986; awarded the certificate of merit of the American Society of International Law)
- Human Rights in Internal Strife: Their International Protection (Sir Hersch Lauterpacht Memorial Lectures, Grotius Publications, 1987)
- Human Rights and Humanitarian Norms as Customary Law (Oxford University Press, 1989)
- Henry's Wars and Shakespeare's Laws (Oxford University Press, 1993)
- Bloody Constraint: War and Chivalry in Shakespeare (Oxford University Press, 1998)
- War Crimes Law Comes of Age: Essays (Oxford University Press, 1998)
- International Law In the Age of Human Rights (Martinus Nijhoff, 2004)
- The Humanization of International Law (Hague Academy of International Law and Nijhoff, 2006);
- The Making of International Justice: A View from the Bench, appeared in 2011 (Oxford University Press).
- Standing Up for Justice: The Challenges of Trying Atrocity Crimes (Oxford University Press, 2021)

Meron is among the editors of Humanizing the Laws of War: Selected Writings of Richard Baxter (Oxford University Press 2013). He has also published well over 100 articles in various legal periodicals.

== Lectures ==
Reflections on the Prosecution of War Crimes by International Tribunals: A Historical Perspective in the Lecture Series of the United Nations Audiovisual Library of International Law
