= Zarnak Sidhwa =

Pakistani chef and chocolatier (born 1977)

- Born: 15 December 1977 (age 48); Karachi
- Occupation: TV Chef
- Known for: Food Diaries

Zarnak Sidhwa (born 15 December 1977) is a Pakistani chef and chocolatier. She is featured in Hum Masala TV show Food Diaries, and used to be a part of Chocoholics.

She is the daughter in law of Pakistan's Supreme Court's Justice Rustam S. Sidhwa. She belongs to Parsi community of Karachi.
