= International Criminal Tribunal for the former Yugoslavia =

1993–2017 Netherlands-based United Nations ad hoc court

- Logo of the Tribunal
- Interactive map of International Criminal Tribunal for the former Yugoslavia
- 52.0944°N 4.2843°E
- Established: 25 May 1993
- Dissolved: 31 December 2017
- Location: The Hague, Netherlands
- Coordinates: 52.0944°N 4.2843°E
- Authorised by: United Nations Security Council Resolution 827
- Judge term length: Four years
- Number of positions: 16 permanent; 12 ad litem
- Website: www.icty.org

The International Criminal Tribunal for the former Yugoslavia (ICTY) (Note: Officially the "International Tribunal for the Prosecution of Persons Responsible for Serious Violations of International Humanitarian Law Committed in the Territory of the Former Yugoslavia since 1991") was an ad hoc court of the United Nations that was established to prosecute the war crimes that had been committed during the Yugoslav Wars and to try their perpetrators. The tribunal was located in The Hague, Netherlands, and operated between 1993 and 2017.

It was established by Resolution 827 of the United Nations Security Council, which was passed on 25 May 1993. It had jurisdiction over four clusters of crimes committed on the territory of the former Yugoslavia since 1991: grave breaches of the Geneva Conventions, violations of the laws or customs of war, genocide, and crimes against humanity. The maximum sentence that it could impose was life imprisonment. Various countries signed agreements with the United Nations to carry out custodial sentences.

A total of 161 persons were indicted; the final indictments were issued in December 2004, the last of which were confirmed and unsealed in the spring of 2005. The final fugitive, Goran Hadžić, was arrested on 20 July 2011. The final judgment was issued on 29 November 2017 and the institution formally ceased to exist on 31 December 2017.

Residual functions of the ICTY, including the oversight of sentences and consideration of any appeal proceedings initiated since 1 July 2013, are under the jurisdiction of a successor body, the International Residual Mechanism for Criminal Tribunals (IRMCT).

== History ==
=== Creation ===
Report S/25704 of the UN Secretary-General, including the proposed Statute of the International Tribunal, approved by UN Security Council Resolution 827

United Nations Security Council Resolution 808 of 22 February 1993 decided that an "international tribunal shall be established for the prosecution of persons responsible for serious violations of international humanitarian law committed in the territory of the former Yugoslavia since 1991", and called on the Secretary-General to "submit for consideration by the Council ... a report on all aspects of this matter, including specific proposals and where appropriate options ... taking into account suggestions put forward in this regard by Member States".

The court was originally proposed by German Foreign Minister Klaus Kinkel.

Resolution 827 of 25 May 1993 approved the S/25704 report of the secretary-general and adopted the Statute of the International Tribunal annexed to it, formally creating the ICTY. It was to have jurisdiction over four clusters of crimes committed on the territory of the former SFR Yugoslavia since 1991:

1. Grave breaches of the Geneva Conventions
2. Violations of the laws or customs of war
3. Genocide
4. Crime against humanity.

The maximum sentence the ICTY could impose for these crimes was life imprisonment.

=== Implementation ===
In 1993 the internal infrastructure of the ICTY was built. 17 states had signed an agreement with the ICTY to carry out custodial sentences.

1993–1994: In the first year of its existence, the tribunal laid the foundations for its existence as a judicial organ. It established the legal framework for its operations by adopting the rules of procedure and evidence, as well as its rules of detention and directive for the assignment of defence counsel. Together, these rules established a legal aid system for the tribunal. As the ICTY was a part of the United Nations and was the first international court for criminal justice, the development of a juridical infrastructure was considered quite a challenge. However, after the first year, the first ICTY judges had drafted and adopted all the rules for court proceedings.

1994–1995: The ICTY established its offices within the Aegon Insurance Building in The Hague (which was, at the time, still partially in use by Aegon) and detention facilities in Scheveningen in The Hague (the Netherlands). The ICTY hired many staff members and by July 1994, the Office of the Prosecutor had sufficient staff to begin field investigations. By November 1994, the first indictments were presented to the court and confirmed, and in 1995, the staff numbered over 200, from all over the world.

=== Operation ===
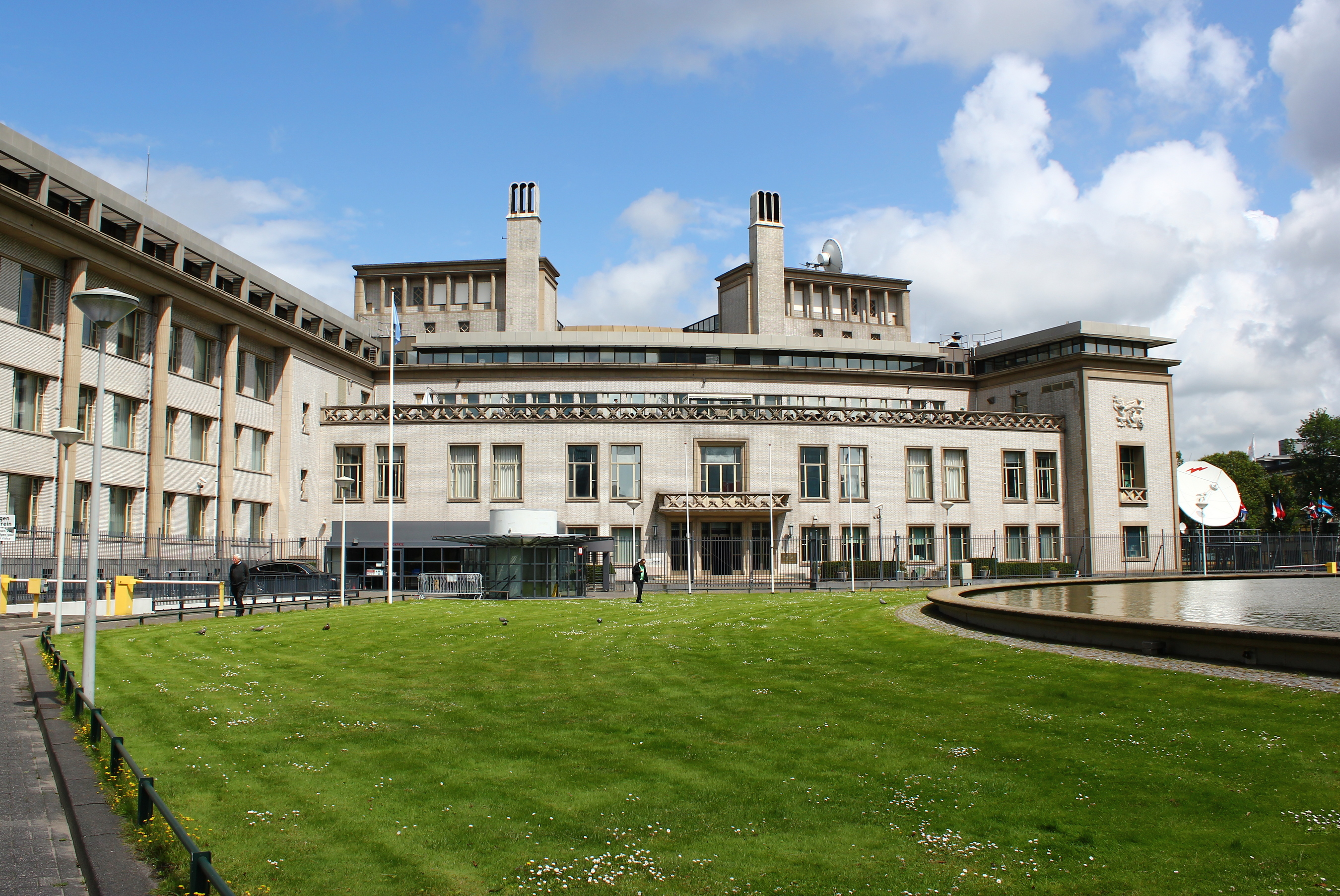
The Tribunal building in The Hague

In 1994 the first indictment was issued against the Bosnian-Serb concentration camp commander Dragan Nikolić. This was followed on 13 February 1995 by two indictments comprising 21 individuals which were issued against a group of 21 Bosnian-Serbs charged with committing atrocities against Muslim and Croat civilian prisoners. While the war in the former Yugoslavia was still raging, the ICTY prosecutors showed that an international court was viable. However, no accused was arrested.

The court confirmed eight indictments against 46 defendants and issued arrest warrants. Bosnian Serb indictee Duško Tadić became the subject of the tribunal's first trial. Tadić was arrested by German police in Munich in 1994 for his alleged actions in the Prijedor region in Bosnia-Herzegovina (especially his actions in the Omarska, Trnopolje and Keraterm detention camps). He made his first appearance before the ICTY Trial Chamber on 26 April 1995, and pleaded not guilty to all of the charges in the indictment.

1995–1996: Between June 1995 and June 1996, 10 public indictments were confirmed against a total of 33 people. Six of them were transferred in the tribunal's detention unit. In addition to Duško Tadic, by June 1996 the tribunal had Tihomir Blaškić, Dražen Erdemović, Zejnil Delalić, Zdravko Mucić, Esad Landžo and Hazim Delić in custody. Erdemović became the first person to enter a guilty plea before the tribunal's court. Between 1995 and 1996, the ICTY dealt with miscellaneous cases involving several detainees, which never reached the trial stage.

=== Indictees and accomplishments ===
The tribunal indicted 161 individuals between 1997 and 2004 and completed proceedings with them as follows:

- 111 had trials completed by the ICTY:
  - 21 were acquitted by the ICTY:
    - 18 acquittals have stood;
    - 1 was originally acquitted by the ICTY, but convicted on appeal by the IRMCT of one count (and sentenced to time served)
    - 2 were originally acquitted by the ICTY, but following a successful appeal by the prosecution the acquittals were overturned and a retrial is being conducted by the IRMCT; and
  - 90 were convicted and sentenced by the ICTY:
    - 87 were transferred to 14 different states where they served their prison sentences, had sentences that amounted to time spent in detention during trial, or died after conviction:
      - 20 remain imprisoned;
      - 58 completed their sentences;
      - 9 died while completing their sentences or after conviction awaiting transfer
    - 2 were convicted and sentenced, and remain in IRMCT detention awaiting transfer; and
    - 1 was convicted and sentenced, but has filed an appeal to the IRMCT that is being considered
- 13 had their cases transferred to courts in:
  - Bosnia and Herzegovina (10);
  - Croatia (2); and
  - Serbia (1)
- 37 had their cases terminated prior to trial completion, because
  - the indictments were withdrawn (20); or
  - the indictees died before or after transfer to the Tribunal (17).

The indictees ranged from common soldiers to generals and police commanders all the way to prime ministers. Slobodan Milošević was the first sitting head of state indicted for war crimes. Other "high level" indictees included Milan Babić, former president of the Republika Srpska Krajina; Ramush Haradinaj, former Prime Minister of Kosovo; Radovan Karadžić, former President of the Republika Srpska; Ratko Mladić, former Commander of the Bosnian Serb Army; and Ante Gotovina (acquitted), former General of the Croatian Army.

The very first hearing at the ICTY was a referral request in the Tadić case on 8 November 1994. Croat Serb General and former president of the Republic of Serbian Krajina Goran Hadžić was the last fugitive wanted by the tribunal to be arrested on 20 July 2011.

An additional 23 individuals have been the subject of contempt proceedings.

In 2004, the ICTY published a list of five accomplishments "in justice and law":

1. "Spearheading the shift from impunity to accountability", pointing out that, until very recently, it was the only court judging crimes committed as part of the Yugoslav conflict, since prosecutors in the former Yugoslavia were, as a rule, reluctant to prosecute such crimes;
2. "Establishing the facts", highlighting the extensive evidence-gathering and lengthy findings of fact that tribunal judgments produced;
3. "Bringing justice to thousands of victims and giving them a voice", pointing out the large number of witnesses that had been brought before the tribunal;
4. "The accomplishments in international law", describing the fleshing out of several international criminal law concepts which had not been ruled on since the Nuremberg Trials;
5. "Strengthening the Rule of Law", referring to the tribunal's role in promoting the use of international standards in war crimes prosecutions by former Yugoslav republics.

=== Closure ===
The United Nations Security Council passed resolutions 1503 in August 2003 and 1534 in March 2004, which both called for the completion of all cases at both the ICTY and its sister tribunal, the International Criminal Tribunal for Rwanda (ICTR) by 2010.

In December 2010, the Security Council adopted Resolution 1966, which established the International Residual Mechanism for Criminal Tribunals (IRMCT), a body intended to gradually assume residual functions from both the ICTY and the ICTR as they wound down their mandate. Resolution 1966 called upon the tribunal to finish its work by 31 December 2014 to prepare for its closure and the transfer of its responsibilities.

In a Completion Strategy Report issued in May 2011, the ICTY indicated that it aimed to complete all trials by the end of 2012 and complete all appeals by 2015, with the exception of Radovan Karadžić whose trial was expected to end in 2014 and Ratko Mladić and Goran Hadžić, who were still at large at that time and were not arrested until later that year.

The IRMCT's ICTY branch began functioning on 1 July 2013. Per the Transitional Arrangements adopted by the UN Security Council, the ICTY was to conduct and complete all outstanding first-instance trials, including those of Karadžić, Mladić and Hadžić. The ICTY would also conduct and complete all appeal proceedings for which the notice of appeal against the judgement or sentence was filed before 1 July 2013. The IRMCT will handle any appeals for which notice is filed after that date.

The final ICTY trial to be completed in the first instance was that of Ratko Mladić, who was convicted on 22 November 2017. The final case to be considered by the ICTY was an appeal proceeding encompassing six individuals, whose sentences were upheld on 29 November 2017.

== Organization ==
While operating, the tribunal employed around 900 staff. Its organizational components were Chambers, Registry, and the Office of the Prosecutor (OTP).

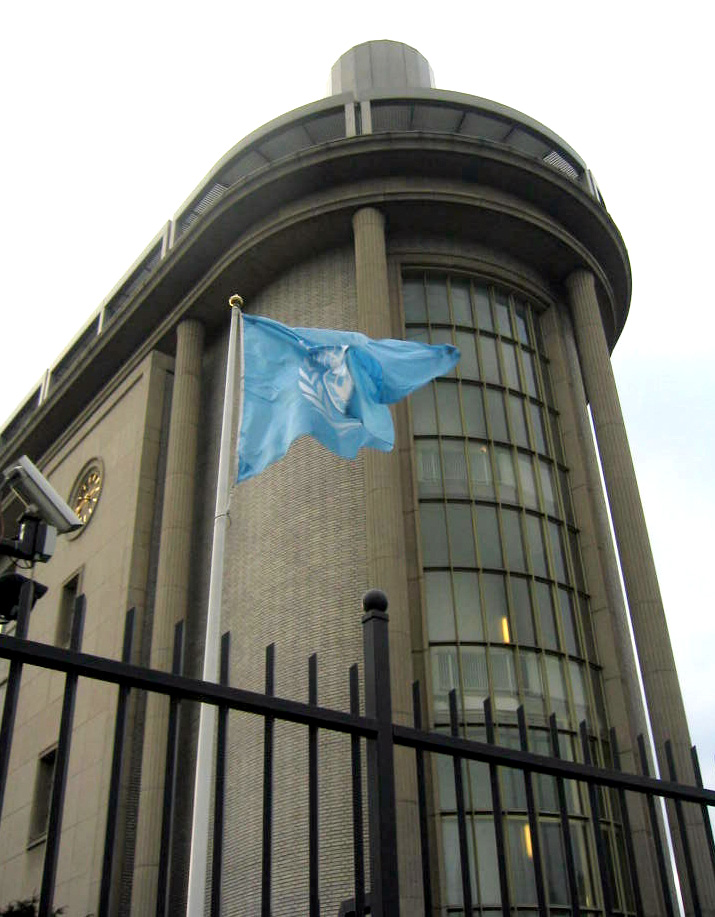
Lateral view of the building

=== Prosecutors ===
The Prosecutor was responsible for investigating crimes, gathering evidence and prosecutions and was head of the Office of the Prosecutor (OTP). The Prosecutor was appointed by the UN Security Council upon nomination by the UN secretary-general.

The last prosecutor was Serge Brammertz. Previous Prosecutors have been Ramón Escovar Salom of Venezuela (1993–1994), however, he never took up that office, Richard Goldstone of South Africa (1994–1996), Louise Arbour of Canada (1996–1999), and Carla Del Ponte of Switzerland (1999–2007). Richard Goldstone, Louise Arbour and Carla Del Ponte also simultaneously served as the Prosecutor of the International Criminal Tribunal for Rwanda until 2003. Graham Blewitt of Australia served as the Deputy Prosecutor from 1994 until 2004. David Tolbert, the president of the International Center for Transitional Justice, was also appointed Deputy Prosecutor of the ICTY in 2004.

=== Chambers ===
Chambers encompassed the judges and their aides. The tribunal operated three Trial Chambers and one Appeals Chamber. The president of the tribunal was also the presiding judge of the Appeals Chamber.

==== Judges ====
At the time of the court's dissolution, there were seven permanent judges and one ad hoc judge who served on the tribunal. A total of 86 judges have been appointed to the tribunal from 52 United Nations member states. Of those judges, 51 were permanent judges, 36 were ad litem judges, and one was an ad hoc judge. Note that one judge served as both a permanent and ad litem judge, and another served as both a permanent and ad hoc judge.

UN member and observer states could each submit up to two nominees of different nationalities to the UN secretary-general. The UN secretary-general submitted this list to the UN Security Council which selected from 28 to 42 nominees and submitted these nominees to the UN General Assembly. The UN General Assembly then elected 14 judges from that list. Judges served for four years and were eligible for re-election. The UN secretary-general appointed replacements in case of vacancy for the remainder of the term of office concerned.

The court’s presidents were Antonio Cassese of Italy (1993–1997), Gabrielle Kirk McDonald of the United States (1997–1999), Claude Jorda of France (1999–2003), Theodor Meron of the United States (2003–2005), Fausto Pocar of Italy (2005–2008), Patrick Robinson of Jamaica (2008–2011), again Theodor Meron (2011–2015), and Carmel Agius of Malta (2015–2017).

Its vice-presidents were Elizabeth Odio Benito of Costa Rica (1993–1995), Adolphus Godwin Karibi-Whyte of Nigeria (1995–1997), Mohamed Shahabuddeen of Guyana (1997–1999), Florence Mumba of Zambia (1999–2001), again Mohamed Shahabuddeen (2001–2003), Fausto Pocar of Italy (2003–2005), Kevin Parker of Australia (2005–2008), O-Gon Kwon of South Korea (2008–2011), Carmel Agius of Malta (2011–2015), and Liu Daqun of China (2015–2017).

Name	State	Position(s)	Term began	Term ended
Georges Abi-Saab	Egypt	Permanent	17 November 1993	1 October 1995
Antonio Cassese	Italy	Permanent / President	17 November 1993	17 February 2000
Jules Deschênes	Canada	Permanent	17 November 1993	1 May 1997
Adolphus Godwin Karibi-Whyte	Nigeria	Permanent / Vice-President	17 November 1993	16 November 1998
Germain Le Foyer De Costil	France	Permanent	17 November 1993	1 January 1994
Li Haopei	China	Permanent	17 November 1993	6 November 1997
Gabrielle McDonald	United States	Permanent / President	17 November 1993	17 November 1999
Elizabeth Odio Benito	Costa Rica	Permanent / Vice-President	17 November 1993	16 November 1998
Rustam Sidhwa	Pakistan	Permanent	17 November 1993	15 July 1996
Ninian Stephen	Australia	Permanent	17 November 1993	16 November 1997
Lal Chand Vohrah	Malaysia	Permanent	17 November 1993	16 November 2001
Claude Jorda	France	Permanent / President	19 January 1994	11 March 2003
Fouad Riad	Egypt	Permanent	4 October 1995	16 November 2001
Saad Saood Jan	Pakistan	Permanent	4 September 1996	16 November 1998
Mohamed Shahabuddeen	Guyana	Permanent / Vice-President	16 June 1997	10 May 2009
Richard May	United Kingdom	Permanent	17 November 1997	17 March 2004
Florence Mumba	Zambia	Permanent / Vice-President	17 November 1997	16 November 2005
Rafael Nieto Navia	Colombia	Permanent	17 November 1997	16 November 2001
Rafael Nieto Navia	Colombia	Ad litem	3 December 2001	5 December 2003
Almiro Rodrigues	Portugal	Permanent	17 November 1997	16 November 2001
Wang Tieya	China	Permanent	17 November 1997	31 March 2000
Patrick Robinson	Jamaica	Permanent / President	12 November 1998	8 April 2015
Mohamed Bennouna	Morocco	Permanent	16 November 1998	28 February 2001
David Hunt	Australia	Permanent	16 November 1998	14 November 2003
Patricia Wald	United States	Permanent	17 November 1999	16 November 2001
Liu Daqun	China	Permanent / Vice-President	3 April 2000	31 December 2017
Carmel Agius	Malta	Permanent / President; Vice-president	14 March 2001	31 December 2017
Mohamed Fassi-Fihri	Morocco	Ad litem	14 March 2001	16 November 2001
Mohamed Fassi-Fihri	Morocco	Ad litem	10 April 2002	1 November 2002
Theodor Meron	United States	Permanent / President	14 March 2001	31 December 2017
Fausto Pocar	Italy	Permanent / President; Vice-president	14 March 2001	31 December 2017
Mehmet Güney	Turkey	Permanent	11 July 2001	30 April 2015
Maureen Harding Clark	Ireland	Ad litem	6 September 2001	11 March 2003
Fatoumata Diarra	Mali	Ad litem	6 September 2001	11 March 2003
Ivana Janu	Czech Republic	Ad litem	6 September 2001	11 September 2004
Amarjeet Singh	Singapore	Ad litem	6 September 2001	5 April 2002
Chikako Taya	Japan	Ad litem	6 September 2001	1 September 2004
Sharon Williams	Canada	Ad litem	6 September 2001	17 October 2003
Asoka De Zoysa Gunawardana	Sri Lanka	Permanent	4 October 2001	5 July 2003
Amin El Mahdi	Egypt	Permanent	17 November 2001	16 November 2005
O-Gon Kwon	Korea, South	Permanent / Vice-President	17 November 2001	31 March 2016
Alphons Orie	Netherlands	Permanent	17 November 2001	31 December 2017
Wolfgang Schomburg	Germany	Permanent	17 November 2001	17 November 2008
Per-Johan Lindholm	Finland	Ad litem	10 April 2002	17 October 2003
Volodymyr Vasylenko	Ukraine	Ad litem	10 April 2002	25 January 2005
Carmen Argibay	Argentina	Ad litem	5 November 2002	18 January 2005
Joaquín Martín Canivell	Spain	Ad litem	2 May 2003	27 September 2006
Inés Weinberg de Roca	Argentina	Permanent	17 June 2003	15 August 2005
Jean-Claude Antonetti	France	Permanent	1 October 2003	31 March 2016
Vonimbolana Rasoazanany	Madagascar	Ad litem	17 November 2003	16 March 2006
Albertus Swart	Netherlands	Ad litem	1 December 2003	16 March 2006
Kevin Parker	Australia	Permanent / Vice-President	8 December 2003	28 February 2011
Krister Thelin	Sweden	Ad litem	15 December 2003	10 July 2008
Chris Van Den Wyngaert	Belgium	Permanent	15 December 2003	31 August 2009
Iain Bonomy	United Kingdom	Permanent	7 June 2004	31 August 2009
Hans Brydensholt	Denmark	Ad litem	21 September 2004	30 June 2006
Albin Eser	Germany	Ad litem	21 September 2004	30 June 2006
Claude Hanoteau	France	Ad litem	25 January 2005	27 September 2006
György Szénási	Hungary	Ad litem	25 January 2005	30 May 2005
Andrésia Vaz	Senegal	Permanent	15 August 2005	31 May 2013
Bakone Moloto	South Africa	Permanent	17 November 2005	31 December 2017
Frank Höpfel	Austria	Ad litem	2 December 2005	3 April 2008
Janet Nosworthy	Jamaica	Ad litem	2 December 2005	26 February 2009
Árpád Prandler	Hungary	Ad litem	7 April 2006	7 June 2013
Stefan Trechsel	Switzerland	Ad litem	7 April 2006	7 June 2013
Antoine Mindua	Congo, Democratic Republic of the	Ad litem	25 April 2006	22 July 2016
Ali Nawaz Chowhan	Pakistan	Ad litem	26 June 2006	26 February 2009
Tsvetana Kamenova	Bulgaria	Ad litem	26 June 2006	26 February 2009
Kimberly Prost	Canada	Ad litem	3 July 2006	31 March 2010
Ole Støle	Norway	Ad litem	13 July 2006	10 June 2010
Frederik Harhoff	Denmark	Ad litem	9 January 2007	28 August 2013
Flavia Lattanzi	Italy	Ad litem	2 July 2007	31 March 2016
Pedro R. David	Argentina	Ad litem	27 February 2008	13 September 2011
Elizabeth Gwaunza	Zimbabwe	Ad litem	3 March 2008	8 June 2013
Michèle Picard	France	Ad litem	3 March 2008	8 June 2013
Uldis Kinis	Latvia	Ad litem	10 March 2008	18 April 2011
Christoph Flügge	Germany	Permanent	18 November 2008	31 December 2017
Melville Baird	Trinidad and Tobago	Ad litem	15 December 2008	31 March 2016
Burton Hall	Bahamas, The	Permanent	7 August 2009	30 July 2016
Burton Hall	Bahamas, The	Ad hoc	21 September 2016	31 December 2017
Howard Morrison	United Kingdom	Permanent	31 August 2009	31 March 2016
Guy Delvoie	Belgium	Permanent	1 September 2009	30 July 2016
Prisca Matimba Nyambe	Zambia	Ad litem	1 December 2009	18 December 2012
Arlette Ramaroson	Madagascar	Permanent	19 October 2011	21 December 2015
Khalida Rashid Khan	Pakistan	Permanent	6 March 2012	21 December 2015
Bakhtiyar Tuzmukhamedov	Russia	Permanent	1 June 2012	21 December 2015
William Sekule	Tanzania	Permanent	18 March 2013	30 April 2015
Mame Mandiaye Niang	Senegal	Permanent	30 October 2013	31 March 2016
Koffi Kumelio A. Afanđe	Togo	Permanent	18 November 2013	30 June 2016

=== Registry ===
The Registry was responsible for handling the administration of the tribunal; activities included keeping court records, translating court documents, transporting and accommodating those who appear to testify, operating the Public Information Section, and such general duties as payroll administration, personnel management and procurement. It was also responsible for the Detention Unit for indictees being held during their trial and the Legal Aid program for indictees who cannot pay for their own defence. The Registry was headed by the Registrar, a position occupied over the years by Theo van Boven of the Netherlands (February 1994 to December 1994), Dorothée de Sampayo Garrido-Nijgh of the Netherlands (1995–2000), Hans Holthuis of the Netherlands (2001–2008), and John Hocking of Australia (January 2009 to December 2017).

=== Detention facilities ===
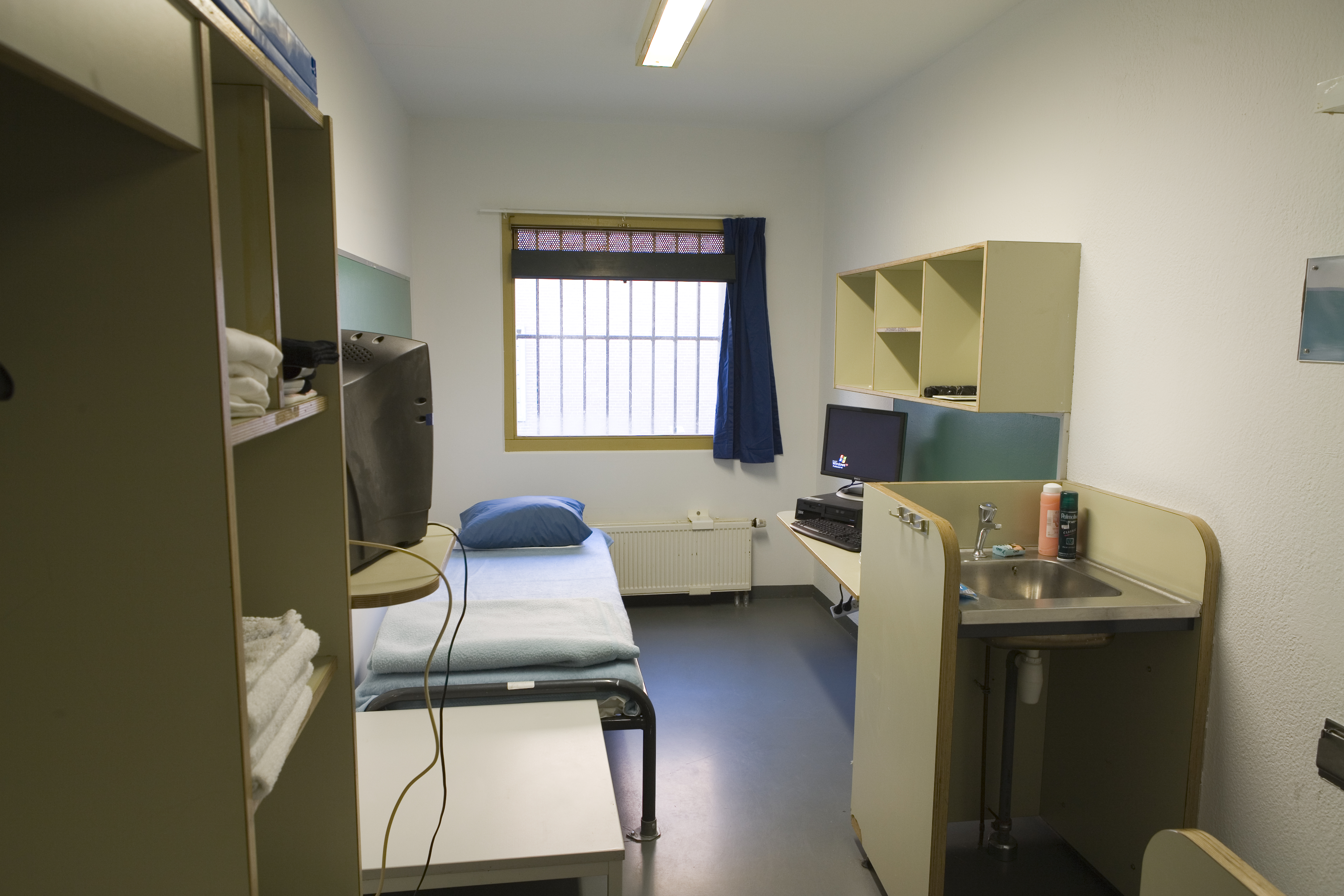
A typical 10 m^{2} single cell at the ICTY detention facilities

Those defendants on trial and those who were denied a provisional release were detained at the United Nations Detention Unit on the premises of the Penitentiary Institution Haaglanden, location Scheveningen in Belgisch Park, a suburb of The Hague, located some 3 km by road from the courthouse. The indicted were housed in private cells which had a toilet, shower, radio, satellite TV, personal computer (without internet access) and other luxuries. They were allowed to phone family and friends daily and could have conjugal visits. There was also a library, a gym and various rooms used for religious observances. The inmates were allowed to cook for themselves. All of the inmates mixed freely and were not segregated on the basis of nationality. As the cells were more akin to a university residence instead of a jail, some had derisively referred to the ICT as the "Hague Hilton". The reason for this luxury relative to other prisons is that the first president of the court wanted to emphasise that the indictees were innocent until proven guilty.

== Criticism ==
The critique concerning the ICTY can be divided into claims pertaining to seven main sections:

=== Legal challenges to the tribunal’s establishment ===
- Some authors have argued, starting from the ICTY's establishment, that the UN Security Council lacked the judicial power to create an ad-hoc tribunal, because the UN Charter does not grant it the right to create judicial institutions at all. The tribunal was established on the basis of Chapter VII of the United Nations Charter; the relevant portion of which reads "the Security Council can take measures to maintain or restore international peace and security".
- Some of the defendants, such as Slobodan Milošević, claimed that the court had no legal authority and legitimate legal basis because it was established by the UN Security Council instead of the UN General Assembly, and so, had not been created on an all encompassing international basis.
- The legal criticism has been succinctly stated in a memorandum] issued by Austrian Professor Hans Köchler, which was submitted to the president of the Security Council in 1999. British Conservative Party MEP Daniel Hannan has called for the court to be abolished, claiming it is anti-democratic and a violation of national sovereignty.

=== Allegations of prosecutorial selectivity ===
- Several notable figures spoke out on alleged selectivity of the indictments.
  - Carla Del Ponte, the Chief Prosecutor of the tribunal, said in 2021 that the US did not want the ICTY to scrutinise war crimes committed by the Kosovo Liberation Army (KLA). According to her, Madeleine Albright, the United States secretary of state at the time, told her to slow down and "be careful" with the investigation of Ramush Haradinaj, former leader of the KLA.
  - Michael Mandel, William Blum and others accused the court of having a pro-NATO bias due to its refusal to prosecute NATO officials and politicians for war crimes. Bachmann and Fatić have shown how the prosecution blurred existing ICTY procedures to avoid indicting NATO officials despite the existing prima facie evidence on war crimes. It did so under intense pressure from NATO representatives. Bachmann and Fatić have shown how the prosecution failed to indict high ranking politicians and militaries mentioned in other indictments as co-perpetrators, because they agreed to assist the prosecution or agreed to testify against other accused persons. According to Hoare, a former employee at the ICTY, an investigative team worked on indictments of senior members of the "joint criminal enterprise", including not only Milošević but also Veljko Kadijević, Blagoje Adžić, Borisav Jović, Branko Kostić, Momir Bulatović and others. However, Hoare claims that, due to Carla del Ponte's intervention, these drafts were rejected, and the indictment limited to Milošević alone. Reducing the indictment charges after the arrest of Ratko Mladić, Croatian officials publicly condemned chief prosecutor Serge Brammertz for his announcement that the former Bosnian Serb General would be tried solely for crimes allegedly committed in Bosnia, not in Croatia.
- There have also been accusations of bias against Serbs in the indictment process:
  - 68% of indictees have been Serbs, to the extent that a sizeable portion of the Bosnian Serb and Croatian Serb political and military leaderships have been indicted. Some authors see this as a reflection of bias and as anti-Serb sentiment (often by the whole tribunal, although the decisions were only made by the prosecution).
  - Research published in 2024 by Barry Hashimoto and Kevin W. Gray has shown that precise statistical analysis proves imbalances among prosecutions and convictions against certain ethnic groups, mainly the findings suggest that Serbs were more likely to be convicted and received longer sentences on average. When accounting for possible biases, the results were not entirely conclusive. Though, Hashimoto and Gray state that under reasonable assumptions, harsher outcomes cannot be explained by legal factors alone and, instead, that the possibility that the tribunal has shown favoritism towards non-Serbs and bias against Serbs is still a valid conjecture.
  - The distribution of crimes among the ethnic communities could also depend on the concept of identity one applies to it. "Serbs" committed most of the crimes during the conflict if one puts all Serbs, holding different citizenships and living in the different parts of the former Yugoslavia (Republic of Serbia, Republika Srpska, Croatia, Kosovo, Montenegro), into one "Serb" basket. They cease to be the main collective culprits if one regards them as members of different communities (Bosnian Serbs, Serbs from Croatia, Serbs from Serbia and Montenegro etc). The same is true for Croats, depending if they are regarded as one nation across national boundaries or members of different communities (Croats from Croatia, Croats from Bosnia or Croats from Montenegro).
  - Some researchers have also argued while the ICTY was biased, it realistically could not avoid bias due to the highly political and ethnically polarised environment in which it had to work. Usually, as Mirko Klarin has set out, the ethnic or national community, which sided with an accused, regarded their trial as unfair, assuming the accused to be innocent, while it regarded trials against its former enemies as a priori as justified. Under such circumstances, Bachmann and Fatić argue that accusations of bias would be inevitable in the ICTY.

=== Concerns regarding fairness of proceedings ===
- Contempt of court and false testimonies:
  - For a long time (until the 2010s) neither prosecution nor chambers regarded it as the ICTY's job to prosecute contempt of court and perjury committed by witnesses. Their hesitance created incentives for the creation and expansion of perjurer networks and the creation of false evidence by either people, who wanted to see an accused sentenced (if he or she came from an opposing group) or acquitted (if he or she stemmed from their own ethnic background). Chambers regarded the prosecution of false testimony in court as being outside their core mandate and made contradictory decisions about who should prevent false testimony (the prosecution or the chambers) and how. Instead of initiating sanctions against perjurers, judges were eager to "explain false testimony away" as examples of cultural exceptions or trauma (Combs and Bachmann).
- Treatment of the defense:
  - In the ICTY, trial chambers often divided the anticipated time of trial into equal parts for the prosecution and the defense, though there were some structural deficits which played out to the detriment of the defense, despite this apparent system of equality. First of all, the defense was no formal part of the tribunal; the ICTY statute did not mention the defense as an organ of the tribunal and defense lawyers did not have access to the securitized part of the ICTY building, but instead had to work outside, having only a small room in the lobby at their disposal. The prosecution on the other hand, could draw from the tribunal resources when conducting investigations and invoke the authority of the tribunal in contacts with national jurisdictions (demanding access to documents and witnesses and the surrender of suspects), the defense could only rely on other states' goodwill and informal contacts.
  - On 6 December 2006, the Tribunal at The Hague approved the use of force-feeding of Serbian politician Vojislav Šešelj. They decided it was not "torture, inhuman or degrading treatment if there is a medical necessity to do so ... and if the manner in which the detainee is force-fed is not inhuman or degrading".
  - Regarding the final case on 29 November 2017 proceeding encompassing six Bosnian-Croat individuals, one of whom, Slobodan Praljak, in protest in court drank poison and subsequently died, the Prime Minister of Croatia, Andrej Plenković, claimed the verdict was "unjust" and Praljak's suicide "speaks of deep moral injustice to the six Croats, from Bosnia and Herzegovina and the Croat people". He criticized the verdict because it did not recognize the assistance and support provided by Croatia to Bosnia and Herzegovina and the collaboration of both armies at a time when the neighbouring state was faced with the "Greater-Serbian aggression" and when its territorial integrity was compromised, as well it alludes to the link between the then leadership of the Republic of Croatia, while in the previous verdict on Bosnian-Serb Ratko Mladić does not recognize the connection with Serbia's state officials at that time.

=== Disputes over sentencing and verdicts ===
- Some sentences have been considered too mild. Even within the tribunal there was criticism of comparatively small sentences of convicted war criminals as opposed to their crimes.
  - In 2010, Veselin Šljivančanin's sentence for his involvement in the Vukovar massacre was cut from 17 to 10 years, which caused outrage in Croatia. Upon hearing that news, Vesna Bosanac, who had been in charge of the Vukovar hospital during the fall of the city, said that the "ICTY is dead" for her: "For crimes that he [Šljivančanin], had committed in Vukovar, notably at Ovčara, he should have been jailed for life. I'm outraged. ... The Hague(-based) tribunal has showed again that it is not a just tribunal." Danijel Rehak, the head of Croatian Association of Prisoners in Serbian Concentration Camps, said, "The shock of families whose beloved ones were killed at Ovčara is unimaginable. The court made a crucial mistake by accepting a statement of a JNA officer to whom Šljivančanin was a commander. I cannot understand that". Pavle Strugar's 8-year sentence for shelling of Dubrovnik, a UNESCO World Heritage Site, also caused outrage in Croatia. Judge Kevin Parker (of Australia) was named in a Croatian journal (Nacional) as a main cause of the system's failure for having dismissed the testimonies of numerous witnesses.
- German politician Klaus-Peter Willsch criticised the verdict in the Ante Gotovina case. He compared the trial (where in which the late Croatian president Franjo Tuđman was posthumously found to have been participating in a joint criminal enterprise) with the 897 AD Cadaver Synod trial in Rome, when Pope Stephen VI had the corpse of Pope Formosus exhumed, put on trial and posthumously found guilty and convicted.

=== The court's efficiency (how much time and resources the court used to achieve its aims, and whether it achieved those aims) ===
- ICTY's own publications usually measure efficiency in terms of the number of indicted persons who were put on trial. From that perspective, the ICTY was very efficient, because it managed to get hold on all the persons for which it had issued indictments. However, trials used to be very long and cumbersome, with some trials re-tried from scratch pursuant to appeals chamber decisions. Critics have argued some of the trials were longer than the benchmarks set by the relevant European Court of Human Rights verdicts (which are legally not binding for the ICTY). This was partly due to the need to provide the accused (and the witnesses) with translations in languages they understood (some accused, like Voislav Sesel, tried to sabotage their trials by claiming not to understand the translation, for example when the translator spoke Croatian rather than Serbian), but – as Boas has pointed out – it was also a consequence of the chamber's inconsistent approach to self-representation, the use of amici curiae and imposed defense counseling for accused persons who refused to accept duty counseling without having their own defense lawyers. In some cases – the Milošević trial is one example – the health conditions of an accused forced the judges to lower the workload for the accused and prolonged the trial beyond the anticipated amount of time.

=== Assessments of the tribunal’s impact and legacy ===
- Critics have questioned whether the tribunal exacerbates tensions rather than promoting reconciliation, which had been one of the main postulates of the Tribunal.
  - Polls show a generally negative reaction to the tribunal among both Serbs and Croats. A majority of Serbs and Croats have expressed doubts regarding the ICTY's integrity and question the tenability of its legal procedures.
  - In the Muslim part of Bosnia and Kosovo support for the ICTY and its mission was usually much higher than in Croatia and Serbia. In the latter, respondents tended to associate the ICTY with NATO (and used to take sides with the suspects from their own ethnic community) while in the Federation of Bosnia and Herzegovina and in Kosovo, they saw the ICTY as an instrument of Europeanisation. As Bachmann has shown, support for the ICTY in polls was usually strongly negatively correlated with the number of community members sentenced by the ICTY.
- Part and parcel of the problems to establish, if the ICTY has contributed to reconciliation, are the underlying concepts of reconciliation which are not yet settled by scholarship:
  - Some authors equate reconciliation with impartial justice, assuming tribunal decision will be endorsed by victims, perpetrators and the broader public if they are issued in accordance with generally accepted rules, while others rely on empirically tested concepts of public legitimacy and then usually find that ICTY decisions only were accepted by the members of a community if they fulfilled their expectations (that is: exonerated community members and sentenced leaders of the enemy group).
  - A research project conducted at SWPS University in Poland between 2012 and 2018 discovered some originally unintended consequences of ICTY decisions:
    - In some cases (Croatia and the Serb community of Bosnia) trial verdicts (concerning the Gotovina and the Visegrad cases) triggered more emphasis on victims from beyond the own ethnic community in these communities' media frames. The project also showed how the ICTY had inclined judicial and administrative reform in some countries under its jurisdiction, either in order to curb the ICTY's principle of primacy (the ICTY could take over any suspect it wanted from a country under its jurisdiction, but governments usually tried to convince the ICTY they could try their suspects themselves) or to adopt to the ICTY completion strategy, under which domestic judiciaries could take over cases from the ICTY but needed to prove they could cope with them. While some of these policy changes (triggered by the ICTY, ICTR and the ICC) remained ambiguous in other parts of the world, they usually led to lasting change in the countries of the former Yugoslavia, because they were bolstered by pressure and support from the European Union and the US (Kemp, Ristić).
- Allegations of censorship:
  - In July 2011, the Appeals Chamber of ICTY confirmed the judgment of the Trial Chamber which found journalist and former tribunal's OTP spokesperson Florence Hartmann guilty of contempt of court and fined her €7,000. She disclosed documents of FR Yugoslavia's Supreme Defense Council meetings and criticized the tribunal for granting confidentiality of some information in them to protect Serbia's "vital national interests" during Bosnia's lawsuit against the country for genocide in front of the International Court of Justice. Hartmann argued that Serbia was freed of the charge of genocide because ICTY redacted certain information in the council meetings. Since these documents have in the meantime been made public by the ICTY itself, a group of organizations and individuals, who supported her, said that the tribunal in this appellate proceedings "imposed a form of censorship aimed to protect the international judges from any form of criticism". (France refused to extradite Hartmann to serve the prison sentence issued against her by the ICTY after she refused to pay the €7,000 fine.)

=== External criticism of the tribunal ===
- The interactive thematic debate on the role of international criminal justice in reconciliation:
  - The debate convened on 10 April 2013 by the President of the General Assembly, Vuk Jeremić, the Minister of Foreign Affairs of Serbia during the resumed part of the GA's 67th Session. The debate was scheduled after the convictions of Ante Gotovina and Mladen Markač for inciting war crimes against Serbs in Croatia were overturned by an ICTY Appeals Panel in November 2012.
  - The ICTY president Theodor Meron announced that all three Hague war crimes courts turned down the invitation of UNGA president to participate in the debate about their work. The President of the General Assembly, Jeremić, described Meron's refusal to participate in this debate as scandalous. He emphasized that he does not shy away from criticizing the ICTY, which has "convicted nobody for inciting crimes committed against Serbs in Croatia." Tomislav Nikolić, the president of Serbia, criticized the ICTY, claiming it did not contribute but hindered reconciliation in the former Yugoslavia. He added that although there is no significant ethnic disproportion among the number of casualties in the Yugoslav wars, the ICTY sentenced Serbs and ethnic Serbs to a combined total of 1150 years in prison while claiming that members of other ethnic groups have been sentenced to a total of 55 years for crimes against Serbs. Vitaly Churkin, the ambassador of Russia to the UN, criticized the work of the ICTY, especially the overturned convictions of Gotovina and Ramush Haradinaj.

== See also ==
- List of people indicted in the International Criminal Tribunal for the former Yugoslavia
- Command responsibility
- International Criminal Court
- International Criminal Tribunal for Rwanda
- International Criminal Court investigation in Palestine
- Trial of Gotovina et al
- Kosovo Specialist Chambers
- Special Tribunal for the Crime of Aggression against Ukraine
