= United Nations Security Council Resolution 1686 =

UN Security Council Resolution 1686
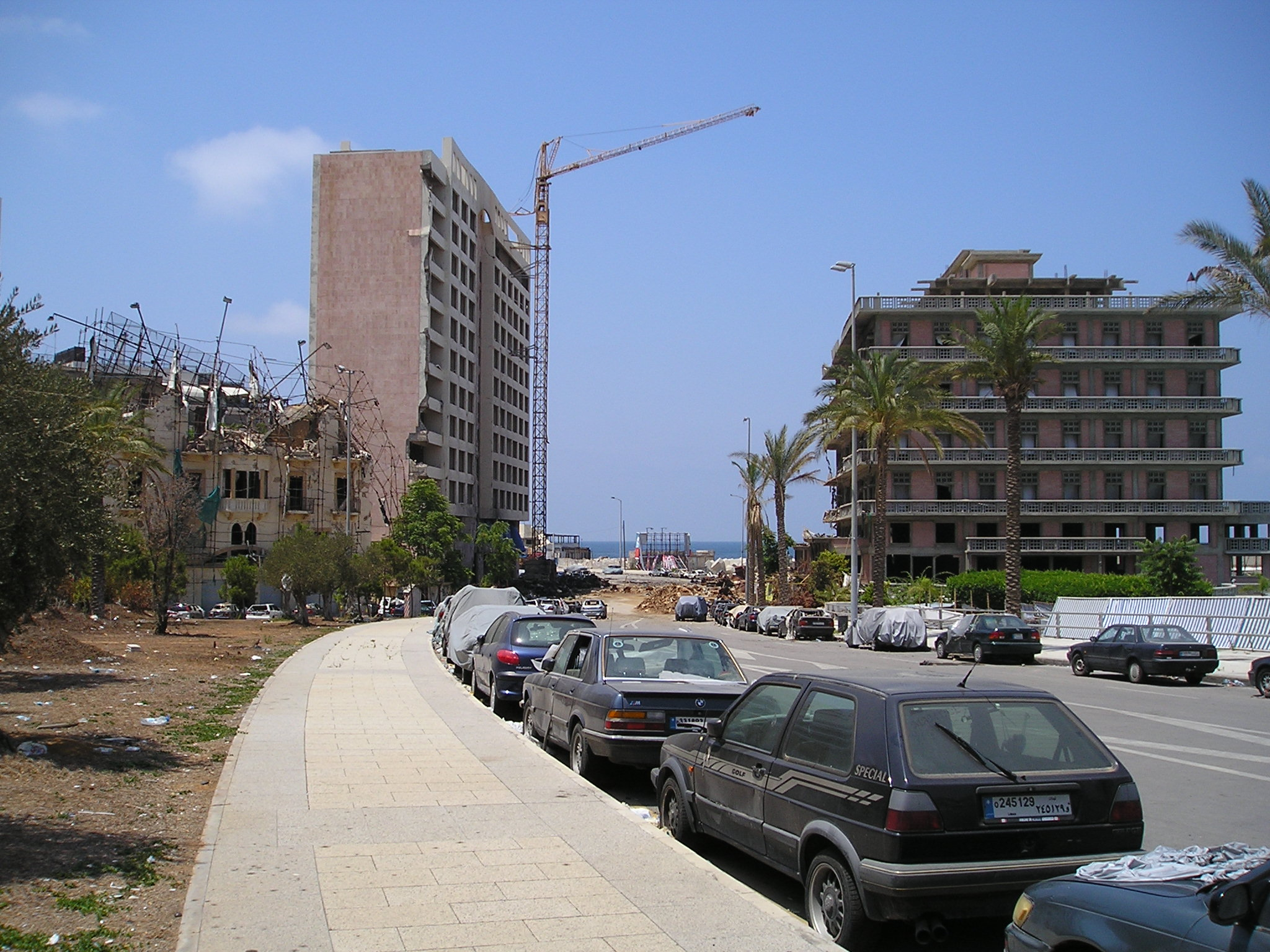
- Scene of the bombing that killed Hariri and 22 others
- Date: 15 June 2006
- Meeting no.: 5,461
- Code: S/RES/1686 (Document)
- Subject: The situation in the Middle East
- Voting summary: 15 voted for; None voted against; None abstained
- Result: Adopted

Security Council composition
- Permanent members: China; France; Russia; United Kingdom; United States
- Non-permanent members: Argentina; Rep. of the Congo; Denmark; Ghana; Greece; Japan; Peru; Qatar; Slovakia; Tanzania

United Nations Security Council Resolution 1686, adopted unanimously on June 15, 2006, after recalling previous resolutions concerning Lebanon and the region, including 1373 (2001), 1566 (2004), 1595 (2005), 1636 (2005), 1644 (2005) and 1664 (2006), the Council extended the mandate of the United Nations International Independent Investigation Commission (UNIIIC) investigating the assassination of former Lebanese Prime Minister Rafik Hariri for one year.

The resolution, adopted in a private session, was backed by France and the United States.

== Resolution ==
=== Observations ===
The Council reaffirmed its condemnation of the bombing that killed Prime Minister Rafik Hariri and 22 others, as well as other attacks in Lebanon since October 2004. It commended the UNIIIC for its work "under difficult circumstances", and noted that while significant progress had been made, the investigation was not yet complete.

Council members declared their willingness to assist Lebanon in bringing those responsible for the attack to account.

=== Acts ===
The Security Council welcomed the report of the UNIIIC and subsequently extended its mandate until June 15, 2007. It supported the Commission's decision to extend its capabilities in order to assist the Lebanese government with investigations into other attacks in Lebanon since October 1, 2004.

Finally, the Council requested the UNIIIC to report quarterly on the progress of the investigation.

== See also ==
- Assassination of Rafic Hariri
- Lebanon–Syria relations
- List of United Nations Security Council Resolutions 1601 to 1700 (2005–2006)
- Special Tribunal for Lebanon
- United Nations International Independent Investigation Commission
