= United Nations Security Council Resolution 1664 =

UN Security Council Resolution 1664
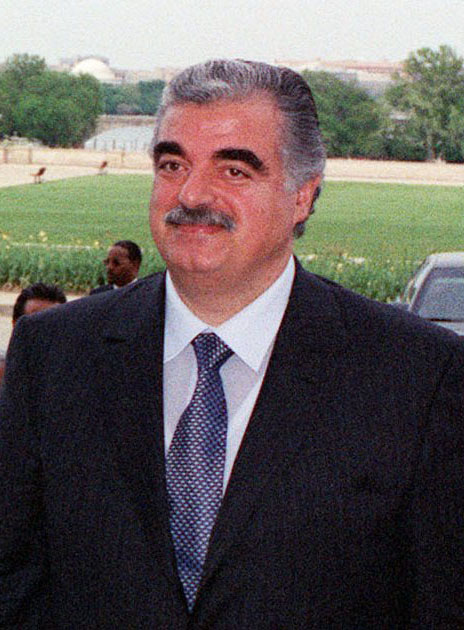
- Rafic Hariri
- Date: 29 March 2006
- Meeting no.: 5,401
- Code: S/RES/1664 (Document)
- Subject: The situation in the Middle East
- Voting summary: 15 voted for; None voted against; None abstained
- Result: Adopted

Security Council composition
- Permanent members: China; France; Russia; United Kingdom; United States
- Non-permanent members: Argentina; Rep. of the Congo; Denmark; Ghana; Greece; Japan; Peru; Qatar; Slovakia; Tanzania

United Nations Security Council Resolution 1664 was adopted unanimously on March 29, 2006; after recalling resolutions 1595 (2005), 1636 (2005) and 1644 (2005), the Council requested the Secretary-General Kofi Annan to consult with the Lebanese government concerning the establishment of an international tribunal to try those responsible for the assassination of Prime Minister Rafic Hariri and 22 others in February 2005.

The adoption of Resolution 1664 marked the Council's commitment to establish the first tribunal try a crime labelled as "terrorism" by the United Nations.

== Resolution ==
=== Observations ===
In the preamble of the resolution, the Council was aware of the demands of the Lebanese people that those responsible for the killing be brought to justice, and the Lebanese government had requested the establishment of an international tribunal to try those responsible. The Security Council expressed its willingness to continue to assist Lebanon in the search for those responsible for the attack.

=== Acts ===
Requesting the Secretary-General and Lebanese government to consult regarding an international tribunal, Council members recognised that adopting a legal framework for the tribunal would not prejudice the phasing-in of its components nor predetermine the timing of the start of its operations. The Secretary-General was required to report on the progress of the negotiations, including options for funding.

== See also ==
- Assassination of Rafic Hariri
- FitzGerald Report
- Lebanon–Syria relations
- List of United Nations Security Council Resolutions 1601 to 1700 (2005–2006)
- Mehlis Report
- Special Tribunal for Lebanon
- United Nations International Independent Investigation Commission
