= United Nations Security Council Resolution 1644 =

UN Security Council Resolution 1644
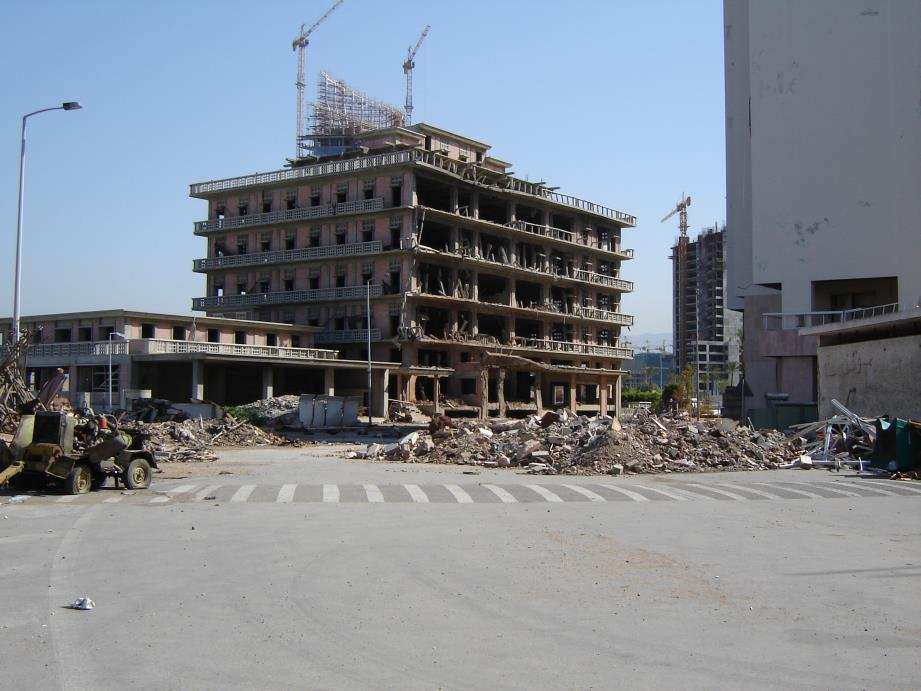
- Scene of the bombing that killed Hariri
- Date: 15 December 2005
- Meeting no.: 5,329
- Code: S/RES/1644 (Document)
- Subject: The situation in the Middle East
- Voting summary: 15 voted for; None voted against; None abstained
- Result: Adopted

Security Council composition
- Permanent members: China; France; Russia; United Kingdom; United States
- Non-permanent members: Algeria; Argentina; Benin; Brazil; Denmark; Greece; Japan; Philippines; Romania; Tanzania

United Nations Security Council Resolution 1644, adopted unanimously on 15 December 2005, after recalling resolutions 1373 (2005), 1566 (2004), 1595 (2005) and 1636 (2005), the Council demanded that Syria respond to the inquiry of the United Nations International Independent Investigation Commission (UNIIIC) into the assassination of former Lebanese Prime Minister Rafic Hariri, and extended the investigation until 15 June 2006.

A stronger version of Resolution 1644—which accused Syria of deliberately hindering the investigation and increased the scope of the inquiry to include other political killings in Lebanon—was watered down by Algeria, China and Russia.

== Resolution ==
=== Observations ===
In the preamble of the resolution, the Council reiterated its condemnation of the assassination and other attacks since October 2004 in Lebanon, and stressed that those responsible should be held accountable. It had examined a report of the UNIIIC and commended the commission for working under "difficult circumstances". All states were required to provide assistance if necessary to the commission.

The Lebanese government requested that the investigation be extended, and that an international tribunal be established to try those responsible for the attack. The Council recognised that Syria had made officials available for questioning, but remained concerned at the overall performance of the Syrian authorities to the investigation.

=== Acts ===
Acting under Chapter VII of the United Nations Charter, the Council extended the mandate of the UNIIIC until 15 June 2006, allowing further extensions if necessary. It held the view that the Syrian government had not provided full co-operation to the inquiry, as demanded in Resolution 1636, and emphasised Syria's obligation to do so.

The commission was requested to report every three months on the progress of the inquiry to the Security Council. The Council acknowledged the Lebanese suggestion that those charged with involvement in the bombing be tried in an international tribunal, and tasked the Secretary-General Kofi Annan to assist the Lebanese government to identify the nature and scope of such a tribunal.

== See also ==
- Assassination of Rafic Hariri
- FitzGerald Report
- Lebanon–Syria relations
- List of United Nations Security Council Resolutions 1601 to 1700 (2005–2006)
- Mehlis Report
- Special Tribunal for Lebanon
- United Nations International Independent Investigation Commission
