= Charles Rizk =

Lebanese Maronite politician

Minister of Justice
- In office 19 July 2005 – 21 July 2008
- President: Emile Lahoud; Michel Suleiman
- Prime Minister: Fouad Siniora
- Succeeded by: Ibrahim Najjar

Personal details
- Born: 20 July 1935 (age 90)

Charles Rizk (Arabic: شارل رزق) (born 20 July 1935) is a Lebanese Maronite politician, who served at different cabinet posts.

== Early life and education ==
Rizk was born on 20 July 1935. He studied at the prestigious Institut d'Etudes Politiques de Paris, and received a PhD in law.

== Career ==
Rizk was a faculty member at Lebanese University until he joined politics. He began his political career as an aide to President Fuad Chehab. He was Lebanon's representative at the Francophonie. Then he became director general of the information ministry in 1967. From 1978 to 1983 he served as the head of the state television station Tele Liban.

At the beginning of 2005, Rizk was appointed information minister. In July 2005, then Prime Minister Fouad Siniora controversially appointed Rizk as justice minister, a post claimed by Michel Aoun and also by Saad Hariri. The appointment of Rizk, a man close to president Lahoud, was opposed as it was felt that the investigation into the murder of Rafic Hariri would be unlikely to be pursued vigorously by a pro-Lahoud minister. Rizk silenced critics by giving the investigation under UNIIIC-Commissioner Detlev Mehlis his full support while later on he became an outspoken critic of Mehlis' successor Serge Brammertz because of his alleged inactivity in the ongoing investigation.

Rizk's term as justice minister lasted until July 2008. He was not appointed to the national unity government headed by Fouad Siniora and was replaced by Ibrahim Najjar.

Rizk was one of the candidates for the Lebanese presidency in 2007.
