= United Nations Security Council Resolution 1636 =

UN Security Council Resolution 1636
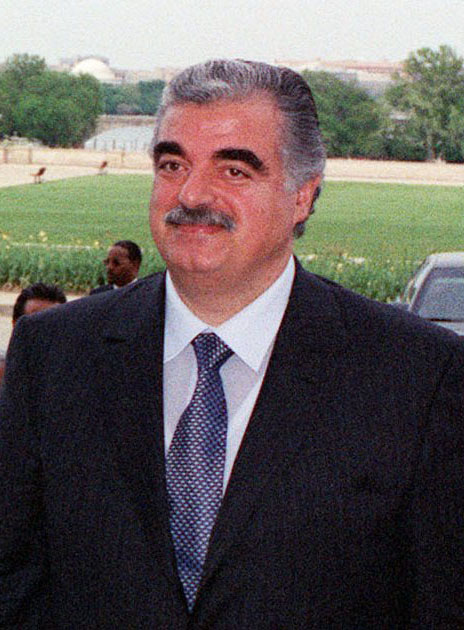
- Rafic Hariri (2001)
- Date: 31 October 2005
- Meeting no.: 5,297
- Code: S/RES/1636 (Document)
- Subject: The situation in the Middle East
- Voting summary: 15 voted for; None voted against; None abstained
- Result: Adopted

Security Council composition
- Permanent members: China; France; Russia; United Kingdom; United States
- Non-permanent members: Algeria; Argentina; Benin; Brazil; Denmark; Greece; Japan; Philippines; Romania; Tanzania

United Nations Security Council Resolution 1636, adopted unanimously on 31 October 2005, after recalling resolutions 1373 (2001), 1566 (2004) and 1595 (2005), the council insisted that the Syrian authorities fully co-operate with the inquiry of the United Nations International Independent Investigation Commission (UNIIIC) into the assassination of former Lebanese Prime Minister Rafic Hariri, not least by arresting the suspects identified by the commission in its final report.

The resolution, sponsored by France, the United Kingdom and United States, was adopted at a meeting where 11 members of the council were represented by their foreign ministers.

== Resolution ==
=== Observations ===
In the preamble of the resolution, the council announced that it had examined the report by the UNIIIC into the bombing in Beirut which killed Hariri and 22 others. The Lebanese authorities were praised for the full co-operation they had given to the inquiry, which had not yet completed its investigation. It was also necessary to continue investigations outside the country, and the Council acknowledged a request from Lebanon to extend the mandate of the UNIIIC. At the same time, it was also recognised that international assistance would be required to establish the truth and hold those responsible for the attack.

The commission had already concluded that, given the interference of Syria in the Lebanese government and the intermingling of the intelligence services of both countries, it was impossible that the attack on Hariri was made without the approval of senior Syrian officials. The council was also mindful that Syrian officials were hesitant to co-operate with the UNIIIC and that some had provided misleading or false information.

=== Acts ===
The following was enacted under Chapter VII of the United Nations Charter, thus making the provisions legally enforceable.

==== I ====
The council was concerned about the conclusion that Lebanese and Syrian officials were involved in the attack. It imposed a travel ban and asset freeze on individuals identified by the UNIIIC that were linked to the assassination. A committee of the security council was established to administer the restrictions. The council determined that the involvement of any state would constitute a serious violation of its obligations to not support terrorism.

==== II ====
The Secretary-General Kofi Annan had extended the mandate of UNIIIC until 15 December 2005, and the council welcomed assistance given to the commission, particularly by the Lebanese authorities through the arrest of former security officials suspected of involvement in the attack.

==== III ====
The council decided that Syria had to detain individuals responsible for involvement in the attack and co-operate unconditionally with the UNIIIC. It also insisted that Syria refrain from interfering in the internal affairs of Lebanon.

==== IV ====
Finally, the UNIIIC was requested to report on the progress of its investigation by 13 December 2005, including co-operation from Syria.

== Reaction ==
Following the adoption of the resolution, Syrian Foreign Minister Farouq al-Shara stated that his country had already co-operated in full and expressed his regret that such a resolution should have been adopted. He also said that the resolution accusing Syria of having knowledge of the attack was tantamount to charging that U.S. officials knew in advance about the 11 September attacks.

== See also ==
- Assassination of Rafic Hariri
- FitzGerald Report
- Lebanon–Syria relations
- List of United Nations Security Council Resolutions 1601 to 1700 (2005–2006)
- Mehlis Report
- Special Tribunal for Lebanon
- United Nations International Independent Investigation Commission
- List of United Nations resolutions concerning Syria
