= Daniel Bellemare =

Canadian prosecutor

Daniel Bellemare (born 1952) is a Canadian prosecutor. After retiring from a long career in the Canadian legal system, Bellemare was named as a prosecutor for the United Nations Special Tribunal for Lebanon, until 2012.

== Canadian legal career ==
Bellemare holds a law degree from the University of Ottawa and completed a Master of Law at the University of Montreal. He was called to the bar in the province of Quebec in 1976. He has served in various Canadian government positions, including Deputy Attorney General and Special Adviser to the Deputy Minister of Justice. He is also the longest-serving head of the Federal Prosecution Service in Canadian history. Bellemare was awarded the Meritorious Service Medal by the Governor General in 2003.

== UN career ==
Bellemare was assigned by UN Secretary-General Ban Ki-moon as the commissioner for the United Nations International Independent Investigation Commission (UNIIIC) on November 19, 2007, replacing Serge Brammertz of Belgium. In November 2008, he was named chief prosecutor of the Special Tribunal for Lebanon, mandated with solving the 14 February 2005 murder of Lebanese Prime Minister Rafik Hariri. Bellemare's performance with the S.T.L. was criticized by the Canadian Broadcasting Corporation in a November 2010 report. The prosecutor was also quoted in the 2010 WikiLeaks United States diplomatic cables leak scandal, where he expressed reservations with the U.S. Governments' approach to the Hariri investigation in a 2008 cable, saying "if the US doesn't help me, who will?"

== Publications ==
Bellemare has published several law-related works in French. How to Testify in Court: The Police Officer's Testimony (1985) has been translated to English.
