= Detlev Mehlis =

German lawyer and public prosecutor (born 1949)

- Born: Detlev Mehlis; 1949 (age 76–77); Berlin, West Germany
- Occupation: Prosecutor

Detlev Mehlis (born 1949) is the Senior Public Prosecutor in the Office of the Attorney General in Berlin. He has 30 years of prosecutorial experience and has led numerous investigations into serious, complex transnational crimes. He has been a senior public prosecutor since 1992 and has, over the course of his career, been responsible for prosecuting terrorism and organized crime cases. Most notably, he investigated the bombing on the discotheque La Belle in then West-Berlin in 1986, which claimed the life of two US soldiers and a Turkish woman, and uncovered the involvement of the Libyan intelligence service. He also proved the involvement of the terrorist Carlos and Syrian diplomats in the attack on the French culture centre Maison de France, also in West-Berlin, in 1983, as well as the involvement of Syrian intelligence services in the bombing of a German-Arab social center in Berlin in 1986. Since 1998, Mehlis has been the Chief of the Contact Office of the European Judicial Network and Coordinator for the fight against organized crime in the State of Berlin.

In 2005, United Nations Secretary-General Kofi Annan appointed Mehlis as the Commissioner of the UN International Independent Investigation Commission (UNIIIC) into the assassination of former Lebanese Prime Minister Rafik Hariri and 22 other persons in Beirut. In October 2005, Jund al-Sham threatened to slaughter Detlev Mehlis while he was heading the UN inquiry into the assassination of Rafik Hariri, claiming that Mehlis was connected with Israel and the CIA.

Mehlis was head of the UNIIIC from 13 May 2005 to 11 January 2006. He issued two reports during his term. The Special Tribunal for Lebanon was not yet established when he was at this post.

The first Mehlis report was presented to the Secretary General on 20 October 2005. It implicated Lebanese and Syrian Military Intelligence in the assassination, and it accused Syrian officials, including now Foreign Minister Muallem, of misleading the investigation. A second report, submitted on December 10, 2005, upholds the conclusions of the first report. On 11 January 2006 Mehlis, upon his own suggestion, was replaced by Serge Brammertz, who upheld UNIIIC's conclusions under Mehlis. An indictment was subsequently issued in 2011 by the Special Tribunal for Lebanon against persons with alleged ties to Hezbollah.

In recognition of his achievements in the fight against terrorism Mehlis has been decorated with the German Bundesverdienstkreuz Erster Klasse (Order of Merit, First Class) and the French l'Ordre National de Merite.

In 2009 Mehlis was appointed by the EU-Commission to head the "European Union Philippines Justice Support Programme" (EPJUST). The program aimed successfully to assist authorities and civil society alike in fighting extrajudicial killings and enforced disappearances in the Philippines.
