= United Nations Security Council Resolution 1757 =

UN Security Council Resolution 1757
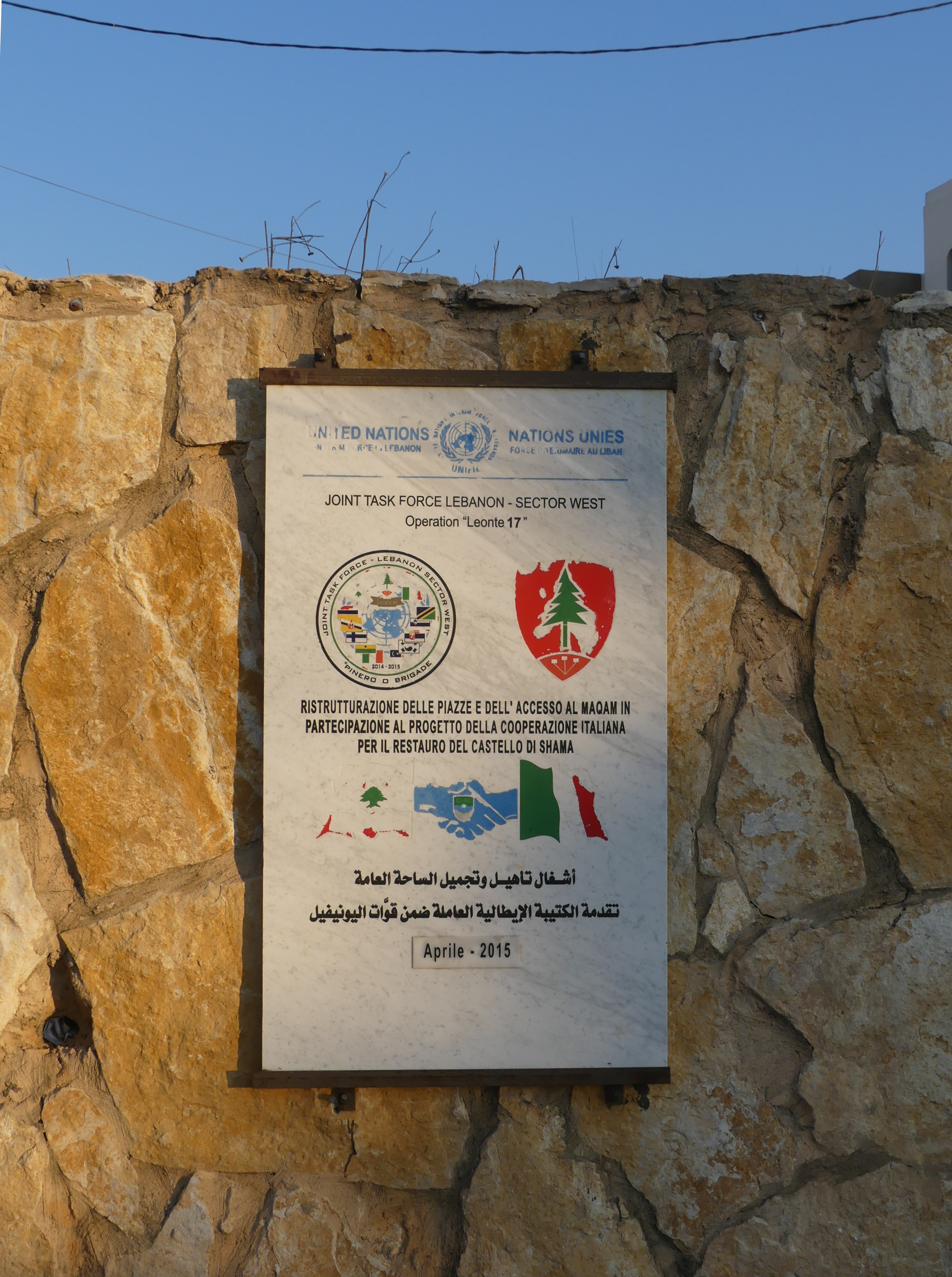
- UNIFIL Italian Contingent cooperation sign
- Date: 30 May 2007
- Meeting no.: 5,685
- Code: S/RES/1757 (Document)
- Subject: The situation in the Middle East
- Voting summary: 10 voted for; None voted against; 5 abstained
- Result: Adopted

Security Council composition
- Permanent members: China; France; Russia; United Kingdom; United States
- Non-permanent members: Belgium; Rep. of the Congo; Ghana; Indonesia; Italy; Panama; Peru; Qatar; Slovakia; South Africa

United Nations Security Council Resolution 1757 was adopted on 30 May 2007.

== Resolution ==
The United Nations Security Council today authorized the formation of an international tribunal to try suspects in the 2005 assassination of former Lebanese Prime Minister Rafiq Hariri, although some members warned that the move could have serious political repercussions because the council was exceeding its authority and interfering in Lebanese affairs.

By a vote of 10 in favour to none against, with 5 abstentions (China, Indonesia, Qatar, Russian Federation and South Africa), the Security Council, acting under Chapter VII of the Charter, adopted resolution 1757 (2007) authorizing the creation of the Special Tribunal for Lebanon. It gives the Lebanese Government until 10 June “to notify the United Nations in writing that the legal requirements for entry into force have been complied with”, thus allowing Lebanese factions 10 days to reach an agreement internally before it goes into effect.

The requirements agreed between the world body and Lebanon last November are attached to the resolution, along with the Tribunal's 30-article founding statute. The measure responds to a request from Lebanese Prime Minister Fouad Siniora, but the country's Parliament has not approved the plan because speaker Nabih Berri has not convened the chamber.

Mindful of the Lebanese people's demand that all those responsible for the 14 February 2005 terrorist bombing that killed the former Lebanese Premier and 22 others be identified and brought to justice, the council also requested Secretary-General Ban Ki-moon, coordinating with, when appropriate, the Lebanese Government, to take the steps and measures necessary to establish the Tribunal “in a timely manner” and to report to the Council within 90 days on the implementation of the resolution. The site of the tribunal would be decided in consultations with Beirut and the country that would host it. Expenses for the tribunal would be borne by United Nations Member States, unless Lebanon could take that responsibility.

== See also ==
- List of United Nations Security Council Resolutions 1701 to 1800 (2006–2008)
- Special Tribunal for Lebanon
