= Shakib Qortbawi =

Lebanese politician (born 1945)

Minister of Justice
- In office 13 June 2011 – 15 February 2014
- Prime Minister: Najib Mikati
- Preceded by: Ibrahim Najjar
- Succeeded by: Ashraf Rifi

Personal details
- Born: 1945 (age 80–81)
- Party: Free Patriotic Movement
- Education: Saint Joseph University

Chakib Cortbaoui (born 1945) is a Lebanese businessman and politician. He served as the minister of justice between June 2011 and February 2014.

== Early life and education ==
Qortbawi was born in 1945 into a Maronite family. He received a bachelor's degree in law from Saint Joseph University in 1967.

== Career ==
Qortbawi was the president of Beirut bar association from 1995 to 1997. Then he began to serve as a member of the legal commission to the Lebanese cabinet and legal commission for the modernization and unification of laws at the ministry of justice. His tenure lasted from 2001 to 2004. In April 2001, he cofounded the Qornet Shehwan Gathering together with nearly thirty Christian politicians. However, after the general elections held in 2000, he left the bloc. He was a member of the national committee of the civil center for national initiative, which was founded by Lebanese politicians and intellectuals in July 2007.

On 13 June 2011, he was appointed minister of justice to Najib Mikati's cabinet. Qortbawi succeeded Ibrahim Najjar as justice minister. Qortbawi was part of the change and reform bloc and the 8 March coalition within the cabinet. And he is a member of the Free Patriotic Movement, headed by Michel Aoun.

Qortbawi's term as justice minister ended on 15 February 2014 when Ashraf Rifi succeeded him in the post.

Political offices
Preceded by Ibrahim Najjar	Minister of Justice; 2011 – 2014	Succeeded by Ashraf Rifi
