= Daryl Mundis =

American lawyer

Daryl A. Mundis
- Education: Manhattanville College (BA). Columbia University (JD); London School of Economics and Political Science (LLM, PhD)
- Occupations: Lawyer, Prosecutor
- Known for: Lead Prosecutor at ICTY (The Hague)
- Awards: Truman Scholarship

Daryl A. Mundis served as a Senior Trial Attorney at The Hague as a lead prosecutor at the International Criminal Tribunal for the former Yugoslavia.

== Education ==
Mundis received his undergraduate degree from Manhattanville College in 1988. While at Manhattanville, Mundis was awarded a Truman Scholarship in his junior year. Following graduation, Mundis attended Columbia University, where he received a Juris Doctor degree in 1992. Mundis earned his LLM in 1998 and his PhD from the London School of Economics and Political Science in 2008. His doctoral thesis, written under the supervision of Christopher Greenwood was entitled The law of naval exclusion zones.

== Career ==
After law school, Mundis was commissioned as an officer in the United States Navy, where he served as a Judge Advocate General for five years before working in The Hague. From 1998 to 2009 he worked for the International Criminal Tribunal for the former Yugoslavia. From 2009 to 2021, he worked for the Special Tribunal for Lebanon, retiring from the United Nations as an Assistant Secretary-General.

== Other activities ==
- International Gender Champions (IGC), Member
