= David Tolbert =

David Tolbert is American lawyer who currently serves as the third president of the International Center for Transitional Justice, a global human rights organization headquartered in New York.

== Education ==
Tolbert obtained his B.A. magna cum laude from Furman University, his J.D. from the University of North Carolina and his LL. M. with distinction from the University of Nottingham. He has published widely regarding international criminal justice, the ICTY and the International Criminal Court (ICC) and has represented the ICTY in the discussions leading up to the creation of the ICC. He has also taught international law and human rights at the post-graduate level in the United Kingdom and practiced law for many years in the United States.

== Career ==
In 2004, he was appointed Deputy Prosecutor of the International Criminal Tribunal for the former Yugoslavia (ICTY) by UN Secretary-General Kofi Annan.

Previously, Tolbert worked with the United Nations for almost 15 years, acting as a senior legal advisor, deputy chief prosecutor and assistant secretary-general. He was the chief of the General Legal Division of the United Nations Relief and Works Agency (UNRWA) in Vienna, Austria and Gaza.

Before becoming the Deputy Prosecutor of ICTY, he had served as deputy registrar and chef de cabinet to President Gabrielle Kirk McDonald in the same institution. He also worked with the Special Tribunal for Lebanon.

He has served as the Executive Director of the American Bar Association's Central European and Eurasian Law Initiative (ABA CEELI), an institution that manages rule of law development programs throughout Eastern Europe and the former Soviet Union.
