= Janet Nosworthy =

Jamaican judge

- Born: Jamaica
- Occupation: Judge

Janet Nosworthy is a Jamaican jurist. In her home country, she worked as a lawyer, prosecutor, and university lecturer. From 2005 to 2009, she was a judge of the International Criminal Tribunal for the former Yugoslavia, and since 2011, she has been a judge of the Special Tribunal for Lebanon.

== Biography ==
Janet Nosworthy is an attorney at law. Nosworthy studied law and was subsequently admitted to the bar association of Gray's Inn in 1972. She then worked as a prosecutor in Jamaica until 1978 and was a criminal defense lawyer from 1974 to 1978 and from 1981 to 2005. In between, she served as a Crown counsel at the Supreme Court and the Court of Appeal of Antigua from 1978 to 1981.

From 1974 to 1978, she was also an assistant professor of law at the Technical University of Kingston. She also trained young lawyers and was active at the Jamaican Bar. Furthermore, she advised on international criminal law for CARICOM.

From 2005 to 2009, she served as an ad litem judge for the International Criminal Tribunal for the former Yugoslavia in The Hague. Here, she presided over the trials against Milan Martić, Milan Milutinović, and Ivica Rajić. In 2011, she was elected as an ad hoc judge of the criminal chamber of the Special Tribunal for Lebanon in Leidschendam.
