= Antonio Cassese =

Italian judge (1937–2011)

Antonio Cassese OMRI
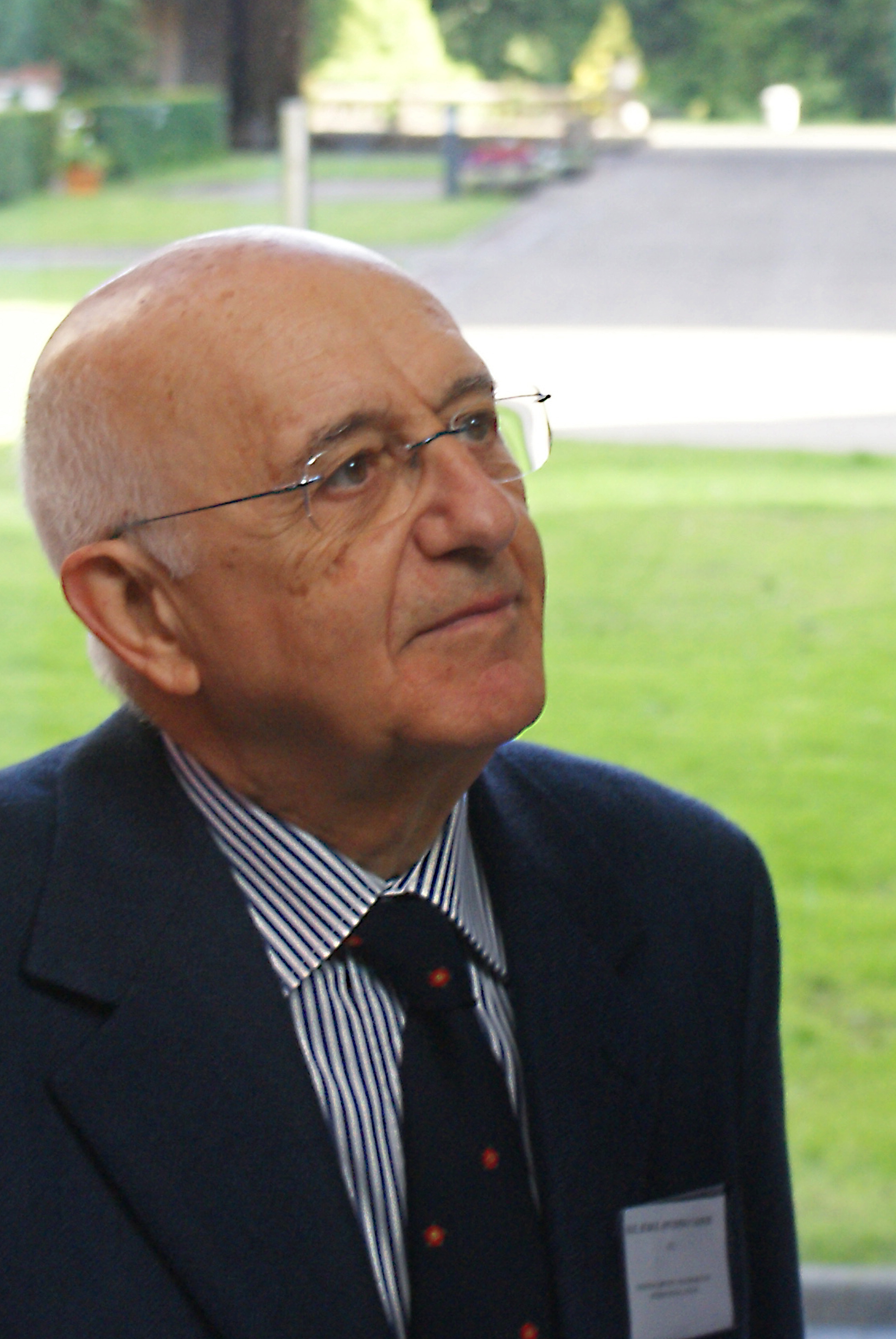

President of the International Criminal Tribunal for the former Yugoslavia
- In office 17 November 1993 – 16 November 1997
- Preceded by: Office established
- Succeeded by: Gabrielle Kirk McDonald

Judge of the International Criminal Tribunal for the former Yugoslavia
- In office 17 November 1993 – 17 February 2000

Personal details
- Born: 1 January 1937 Atripalda, Italy
- Died: 21 October 2011 (aged 74) Florence, Italy
- Relatives: Sabino Cassese (brother)
- Occupation: Public international law jurist

Antonio Cassese OMRI (1 January 1937 – 21 October 2011) was an Italian jurist who specialized in public international law. He was the first President of the International Criminal Tribunal for the former Yugoslavia and the first President of the Special Tribunal for Lebanon which he presided over until his resignation on health grounds on 1 October 2011.

== Early life ==
Born in Atripalda, Cassese was educated at the University of Pisa (at the prestigious Collegio Medico-Giuridico of the Scuola Normale Superiore, which today is Sant'Anna School of Advanced Studies), where he met his mentor, Giuseppe Sperduti, who was an international lawyer and a member of the European Commission on Human Rights. Cassese eventually decided to pursue an academic career in public international law under Sperduti's guidance.

== Academic career ==
Cassese was the Professor of International Law at the University of Pisa from 1972 to 1974. In 1975 he joined the University of Florence, where he served as professor until 2008. He was a visiting fellow at All Souls College, Oxford, from 1979 to 1980 and professor of law at the European University Institute from 1987 to 1993.

He published extensively on international human rights law and international criminal law. He was the author of International Law and International Criminal Law published by the Oxford University Press, the co-founder and co-editor of the European Journal of International Law, and founder and editor-in-chief of the Journal of International Criminal Justice.

Cassese was granted Doctorates honoris causa by Erasmus University Rotterdam, Paris X University and the University of Geneva, and was a member of the Institut de Droit International. In 2002, he received the Grand Prix awarded by the Académie Universelle des Cultures, presided over by the Nobel Laureate Elie Wiesel, for "exceptional contribution to the protection of human rights in Europe and the world". On 13 November 2009, Cassese received the Erasmus Prize for his services in the field of international law.

== Judicial and public career ==
Cassese was Chairman of the Council of Europe Steering Committee for Human Rights from 1987 to 1988 and President of the European Committee for the Prevention of Torture from 1989 to 1993. He represented the Italian Government on many occasions at UN meetings on human rights and served as the representative at the Geneva Diplomatic Conference on the Humanitarian Law of Armed Conflicts from 1974 to 1977.

He was the first President of the International Criminal Tribunal for the former Yugoslavia (ICTY), serving in this capacity from 1993 to 1997. After his tenure as President, he continued to sit as a Tribunal judge until February 2000.

In his book International Criminal Law (2003), he argued for the expansion of criminal responsibility of an offender. He equalised dolus eventualis with recklessness, and expanded his term "culpable negligence" (culpa gravis) to unconscious negligence. By this, he got closer to the objective responsibility of an offender for a risk (strict liability). For this he was criticised, as this contradicted the general rule that objective responsibility, in this case, cannot be part of the criminal law of civilised countries.

In October 2004, Cassese was appointed by UN Secretary-General Kofi Annan to be the Chairperson for the International Commission of Inquiry on Darfur. This Commission was to investigate potential international and human rights violations taking place in Darfur, and to determine whether or not acts of genocide had occurred.

On 25 January 2005, the Commission issued its "Report to the Secretary-General." The Commission found that while there was evidence of war crimes and crimes against humanity, the government of Sudan had not committed acts of genocide. This finding was contrary to the position of the United States, which had already labelled the Government's activities as "genocide". The Commission recommended the U.N. Security Council use its referral power under the Rome Statute to refer the Darfur case to the International Criminal Court in The Hague. This recommendation was expected from the Commission, as Cassese was known to be an ardent supporter of the International Criminal Court. In March 2005, the U.N. Security Council acted upon the ICC's recommendation and used its referral power for the first time to refer the Darfur case to the ICC.

In May 2005, Cassese was appointed a Knight Grand Cross of the Order of Merit of the Italian Republic (OMRI).

In October 2008, Cassese was legal advisor to the European Committee for Delisting the PMOI (People's Mujahedin of Iran).

Cassese was elected as the President of the Special Tribunal for Lebanon (STL) in March 2009. He was the first president of STL. He resigned on health grounds on 1 October 2011 and was succeeded by David Baragwanath.

== Death ==
Antonio Cassese died in Florence on 21 October 2011, after a long fight with cancer. He was 74.

== Private archives ==
The private papers of Antonio Cassese have been deposited at the Historical Archives of the European Union. The documents are open for consultation.

== Antonio Cassese Initiative for Peace, Justice and Humanity ==
In April 2012, a group of Cassese's friends and admirers launched, in Geneva, the Antonio Cassese Initiative for Peace, Justice and Humanity. The Initiative aims at perpetuating the values incarnated by Professor Cassese's teachings, and at promoting - by means of a wide range of education and research activities - international peace, human rights and the rule of law.
