= Robin Vincent =

Registrar (1944–2011)

Robin Vincent, CMG, CBE (27 February 1944 – 12 June 2011) was an international expert in the administration of justice and a major contributor to the creation and effective functioning of international criminal tribunals.

Married to Hazel Vincent with two sons Mark and Stephen Vincent

== Career ==
He started his career in 1962 in the British court system as a court administrator in Worcester County. He later served in the Lord Chancellor’s Department Headquarters as Head of the Court Service Development, and Head of the Personnel and Judicial Appointments Divisions. In 1993, he became Regional Director for the North West of England, and in that capacity, he served as a member of the Court Service Board for England and Wales.

In 2000, the British Council and the UK Department for International Development appointed him to provide training in court administration for the Russian Judicial Department in Moscow and southern Russia.

From January 2002, at the request of the United Nations, Robin Vincent participated in the preparations for the establishment of the Special Court for Sierra Leone (SCSL), and, on 10 June 2002, he was appointed as its first Registrar. In that capacity, he advocated for the institution of a principal defender office to strengthen the role of the defense in international tribunals and supported an innovative outreach program that has since become a model for other tribunals.

After leaving the SCSL in October 2005, Robin Vincent served as Deputy Registrar of the International Criminal Tribunal for the Former Yugoslavia in 2006. Also in 2006, he advised the US Regime Crimes Liaison Office on the functioning of the Iraqi High Tribunal.

In 2007, Robin Vincent served as expert adviser to the Secretary-General of the United Nations on matters about the operational efficiency of the Extraordinary Chambers in the Courts of Cambodia, and authored the report “Administrative Practices Manual for Internationally Assisted Criminal Justice Institutions” published by the International Center for Transitional Justice (ICTJ).

In 2007, Robin Vincent was also named by the Secretary-General of the United Nations to lead the advance team working on the establishment of the Special Tribunal for Lebanon (STL) and, in March 2008, was appointed as its Registrar. He served as STL Registrar until June 2009.

Robin Vincent was invested as a Commander of the Order of the British Empire and a Companion of the Most Distinguished Order of St Michael and St George by Queen Elizabeth II in 2001 and 2006, respectively. He also received an honorary degree for services rendered to national and international justice by the University of Worcester in 2007.

== Lectures ==
The Administrative Challenges to Be Faced in Setting Up an International War Crimes Court and the Lessons Learned in the Lecture Series of the United Nations Audiovisual Library of International Law
