= David Baragwanath =

New Zealand lawyer and jurist

The Honourable Sir David Baragwanath KNZM KC

President of the United Nations Special Tribunal for Lebanon
- In office 2011–2015
- Preceded by: Antonio Cassese
- Succeeded by: Ivana Hrdličková

Justice of the Court of Appeal
- In office 2007–2010

Personal details
- Born: William David Baragwanath; 3 August 1940 (age 86) Balclutha, New Zealand

Sir William David Baragwanath KNZM KC (born 3 August 1940) is a New Zealand lawyer and jurist. He served as president of the United Nations Special Tribunal for Lebanon between 2011 and 2015.

== Early life and education ==
Baragwanath was born in Balclutha on 3 August 1940, the son of Eileen Baragwanath (née Richards) and The Very Rev. Owen Baragwanath OBE, who served as Moderator of the Presbyterian Church in New Zealand. He attended Auckland Grammar School, followed by University of Auckland Law School. A Rhodes Scholar, he earned a Bachelor of Civil Law from the University of Oxford.

== Career ==
Baragwanath began his legal career as a member of the lawyers’ syndicate in New Zealand. He acted for both the prosecution and defence in major criminal cases, including murder and fraud trials. He was appointed Queen's Counsel in 1983 and is a former president of the New Zealand Law Commission. At the time of his appointment to the Court of Appeal, he was the second-longest-serving high court judge based at the High Court at Auckland, behind Hugh Williams. Baragwanath is also a New Zealand member of the Permanent Court of Arbitration in The Hague, and has also been a member of the Court of Appeal of Samoa.

Baragwanath became a member of the United Nations Special Tribunal for Lebanon in March 2009. In October 2010, he was appointed one of four appeals judges to the Special Tribunal for Lebanon, and he was elected president of the tribunal on 10 October 2011, following the death of Judge Antonio Cassese. He is an overseas bencher of the Inner Temple in London. He was succeeded as tribunal president by Ivana Hrdličková on 1 March 2015, but remained an appeals judge.

== Honours and awards ==
In 1990, Baragwanath was awarded the New Zealand 1990 Commemoration Medal. In the 2011 New Year Honours, he was appointed a Knight Companion of the New Zealand Order of Merit for services as a judge of the Court of Appeal.

== Other activities ==
In addition to his judicial work, Baragwanath has published articles on both national and international human rights issues, constitutional matters, the rule of law, and international judicial cooperation. He has also taught at the University of Cambridge, Queen Mary University of London, University of Hong Kong, University of Manitoba and the Netherlands Institute of Advanced Studies as a visiting scholar.

== Personal life ==
Baragwanath has been married twice, and has four children. His current and second wife is the educationalist Susan Baragwanath.

== Sources ==
- NZ Herald
