= Ibrahim Najjar =

Lebanese politician

- إبراهيم نجار
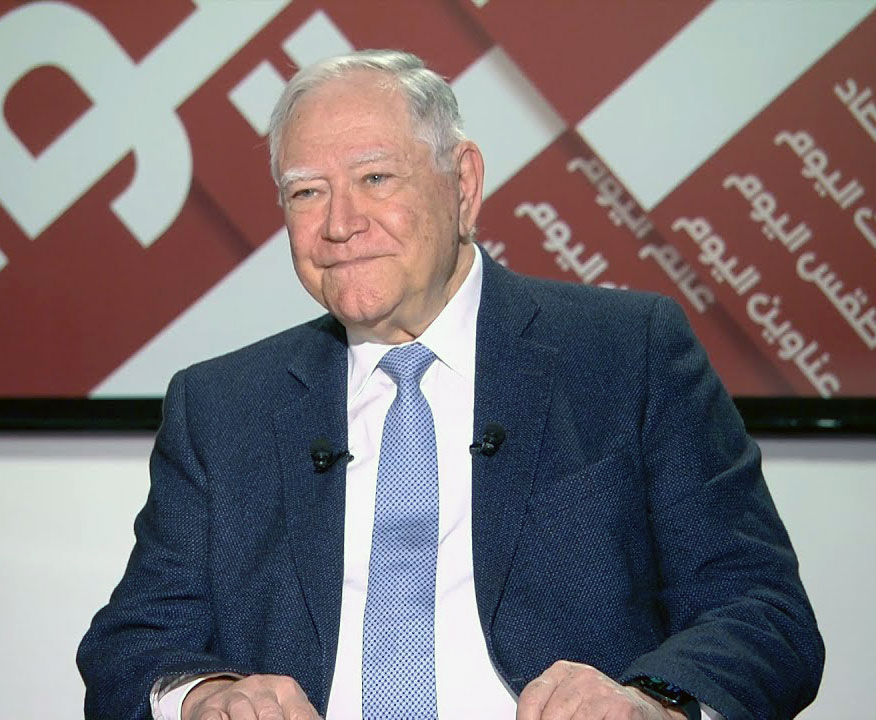

Ibrahim Najjar is a lawyer, a professor of law, a Lebanese politician and a former Justice minister (2008–2011).

== Early life and education ==
Najjar was born 2 September 1941 in Tripoli, North Lebanon, and is an adherent of the Greek Orthodox Church.

After high school at St. Joseph's College Antoura and the French Lycée in Beirut, he studied at the Université Saint-Joseph in Beirut and in France. Ibrahim Najjar has been appointed as full titled professor, after a competitive selection, since March 14, 1969 after teaching law since 1966 at The Faculty of Law He is the author of a thesis (1966) on the "potestative rights" in French law, and of two major law books on Family laws (Successions, wills and gifts) in Lebanon, together with a law Dictionary (French Arabic and Arabic French). Ibrahim Najjar was a visiting professor at Paris 2 Assas, Panthéon Sorbonne, Toulouse and Nantes Universities. In 2016 Ibrahim Najjar published three law books on French private law and Lebanese law studies. In 2018, Najjar published "A letter to Ibrahim" and another book on his experience as minister of justice ("At The Justice Ministry", 2019). In October 2020 and 2025 a new edition of Najjar's "Family Patrimonial Rights" are published in two volumes: "The Gifts. The Theory. The donations. The Wills", and "The Matrimonial Right - The Successions" with important updates. In 2022, an autobiography covering 1941-1990 was published in Arabic, under the title "Choices and Destiny - Parts of a life", followed by "At the Justice Palace"

== Career and views ==
Najjar is close to the March 14 movement. He was formerly a Kataeb Party senior official; he founded and presided its students bureau in early 1960s. He was the head of the Kataeb's Koura district bureau from 1973 to 1978. He was member of the Constitutional reform Committee, in his capacity as representative of the Lebanon Phalanges Party (year 1985). This Committee achieved in setting the Lebanese Constitution first part titled "Fundamental Provisions" that was adopted in the constitutional reform of 1990. Since 1966, Najjar is also a law professor at Saint Joseph University. His numerous writings in the famous Dalloz Encyclopedia, the Dalloz Bulletin and the French Revue Trimestrielle de droit civil - he is still its Lebanon correspondent - are well known. Najjar is the owner and editor of The Lebanese Review of Arab And International Arbitration since 1996; he also published during more than 30 years the Saint Joseph Faculty of Law Journal, Proche Orient Etudes Juridiques, since 1975. The National medal for Human rights was attributed to Najjar in 2010 after his draft law to abolish death penalty in Lebanon. Najjar was also elected to get the Medal of honor of the St Joseph University. In June 2013, he was made Officer of the Legion of Honor by the French President of Republic; in July 2015 he was granted the decoration of Commandor of the Spanish order of Isabella the Catholic. Since October 2, 2017, Najjar is vice president of the International Commission against the Death Penalty. Since June 29, 2016, Najjar is emeritus professor at the Faculty of Law of the Saint Joseph University, Lebanon. In June 2017 he was appointed as President of the Disciplinary Board of the Special Tribunal For Lebanon for a period of two years. This appointment was renewed for a period of two years starting June 21, 2019. In 2018, he founds an NGO "Ibrahim Najjar For Culture and Freedom” to promote the restoration of the rule of law and an education focused on the freedom and fundamental human rights. Najjar was appointed Minister of Justice in July 2008 to the cabinet headed by then prime minister Fouad Siniora. In November 2009, he was again named minister of Justice in the cabinet led by then prime minister Saad Hariri. His term of three years at the ministry of Justice is considered one of the most fruitful period for the judiciary and the promotion of draft laws in many fields (arbitrary detention, human rights, successions and wills, Lebanese citizenship for the generations of Lebanese ascent, the transformation of the justice ministry into a ministry for freedom and human rights). Moreover, two major judiciary permutations were conducted by him in 2009 and 2010 after having been frozen for several years, and the judges’ remunerations were almost doubled in 2011 in order to upgrade their status. Najjar's tenure ended in June 2011, and was succeeded by Shakib Qortbawi as justice minister. In August 2023 Najjar is appointed by the Prime minister to preside over the Special Committee to revise the Code of Money and Credit. In June 2026 he was appointed as member of the Presidential Advisory Council of the Holy Spirit University (USEK)..
