= United Nations Security Council Resolution 1595 =

UN Security Council Resolution 1595
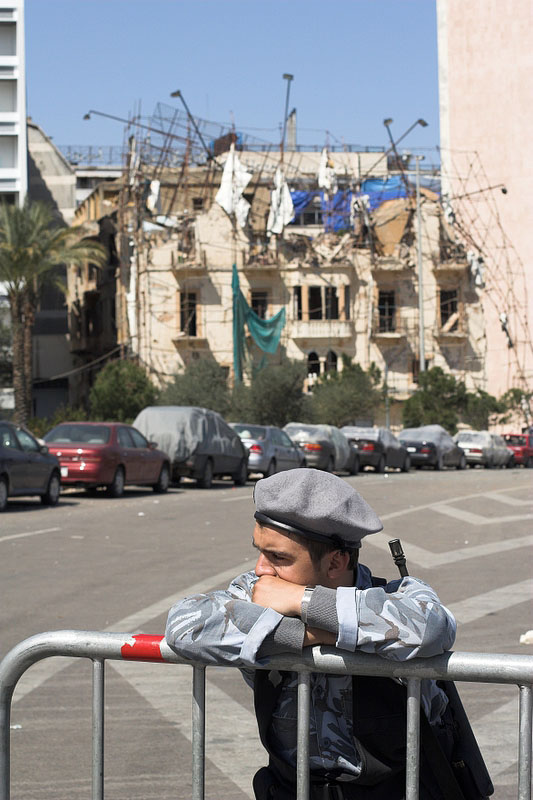
- Site of Rafic Hariri's assassination
- Date: 7 April 2005
- Meeting no.: 5,160
- Code: S/RES/1595 (Document)
- Subject: The situation in the Middle East
- Voting summary: 15 voted for; None voted against; None abstained
- Result: Adopted

Security Council composition
- Permanent members: China; France; Russia; United Kingdom; United States
- Non-permanent members: Algeria; Argentina; Benin; Brazil; Denmark; Greece; Japan; Philippines; Romania; Tanzania

United Nations Security Council resolution 1595, adopted unanimously on 7 April 2005, after recalling its support for the sovereignty, territorial integrity and independence of Lebanon, the council established a commission to assist Lebanese authorities in their investigation of the assassination of former Prime Minister Rafic Hariri in Beirut on 14 February 2005.

The resolution effectively established the United Nations' first-ever murder investigation.

== Resolution ==
=== Observations ===
In the preamble of the resolution, the Council condemned the assassination of Rafic Hariri in the Lebanese capital, and urged all concerned to act with restraint. A fact-finding mission had reported that the Lebanese investigation into the incident would reach a satisfactory or credible conclusion. Therefore, the Council decided that an international independent investigation would be necessary, as it was aware that those responsible for the attack had to be identified and held accountable. It thanked the Lebanese government for approving permission for an international inquiry.

=== Acts ===
The council established an international commission to investigate the assassination and identify the perpetrators, further calling upon the Lebanese government to ensure its findings were taken fully into account. It stated that the commission would have full freedom of movement, co-operation from Lebanese authorities, collect additional evidence and have the necessary facilities in order to perform its functions appropriately. The Secretary-General Kofi Annan was asked to assist in the establishment of the commission and recruitment of its staff.

All countries were called upon to co-operate with the commission, which was instructed to complete its work within three months, though the Secretary-General could authorise an additional three-month extension if required.

== See also ==
- Assassination of Rafic Hariri
- Lebanon–Syria relations
- List of United Nations Security Council Resolutions 1501 to 1600 (2003–2005)
- Mehlis Report
- Special Tribunal for Lebanon
- List of United Nations resolutions concerning Syria
