= Special Tribunal for Lebanon =

International tribunal for the Rafic Hariri assassination

- Arabic: المحكمة الخاصة بلبنان; French: Tribunal spécial pour le Liban
- Logo of the Tribunal
- Interactive map of Special Tribunal for Lebanon
- 52.080°N 4.391°E
- Established: 1 March 2009
- Dissolved: 31 December 2023
- Jurisdiction: International
- Location: Leidschendam, Netherlands
- Coordinates: 52.080°N 4.391°E
- Composition method: Appointment by the United Nations Secretary-General
- Authorised by: Resolution 1757
- Judge term length: 3 years
- Number of positions: 9
- Website: http://www.stl-tsl.org/

The Special Tribunal for Lebanon (STL), also referred to as the Lebanon Tribunal or the Hariri Tribunal, was a tribunal of international character that was active between 2009 and 2023. It applied Lebanese criminal law under the authority of the United Nations to carry out the investigation and prosecution of those responsible for 14 February 2005 assassination of Rafic Hariri, the former Lebanese prime minister, and the deaths of 21 others, as well as those responsible for connected attacks.

The Tribunal officially opened on 1 March 2009 and had primacy over the national courts of Lebanon. The Tribunal sat in Leidschendam, on the outskirts of The Hague, Netherlands, and had a field office in the Lebanese capital, Beirut. Its official languages were Arabic, French and English. The Tribunal was unique among international criminal tribunals in that it had the right to hold trials in absentia, and it was the first to deal with terrorism as a distinct crime. (All of the defendants who were indicted by the tribunal were prosecuted in absentia.) The Tribunal's eleven judges, a combination of Lebanese and international judges, were appointed by the UN Secretary-General for a renewable term of three years.

The Tribunal's mandate was initially three years. However, there was no fixed timeline for the judicial work to be completed. The mandate was subsequently extended through to 2023 to allow the Tribunal to complete its work before it was ultimately shut down.

The verdict was eventually issued on 18 August 2020, which was originally set on 7 August, but postponed following the 2020 Beirut explosion. The verdict found Salim Ayyash, member of Hezbollah's Unit 121, guilty in absentia of five counts, including conspiracy to commit a terrorist act and the intentional homicide of Hariri and others. The conviction was primarily based on circumstantial evidence, notably mobile phone records that linked Ayyash to the surveillance and coordination of the attack.

In July 2021, the Special Tribunal for Lebanon announced that it faced financial difficulties due to a lack of funding, primarily driven by Lebanon's deepening economic crisis. Ultimately, on 31 December 2023, UN spokesperson Stéphane Dujarric announced the STL's closure.

== History ==
In March 2006, United Nations Security Council Resolution 1664, the Security Council requested the Secretary-General consult with the Lebanese government on the establishment of an international tribunal to try those responsible for the 14 February 2005 attack. The Lebanese government and United Nations signed an agreement for the Special Tribunal for Lebanon on 23 January 2007 and 6 February 2007 respectively. However, the Lebanese Prime Minister wrote to the UN Secretary-General in May 2007 stating that the Speaker refused to convene Parliament, and therefore the agreement could not be ratified, despite the support of a majority of parliamentarians.

Due to this political impasse, the Security Council implemented the agreement through United Nations Security Council Resolution 1757 on 30 May 2007, under Chapter VII of the United Nations Charter. According to the resolution, the agreement (attached as an annexe) would enter into force on 10 June 2007, unless Lebanon informed the United Nations that it complied with the legal requirements for its entry into force before that date. The political stalemate did not resolve itself, and the Agreement therefore came into force on 10 June 2007.

Following its legal establishment, the Secretary-General of the United Nations announced on 17 August 2007 that the Netherlands had agreed to host the Tribunal. The UN and the Netherlands signed a headquarters agreement to formalize the agreement on 21 December 2007.

The Tribunal opened its doors on 1 March 2009, taking over jurisdiction from the United Nations International Independent Investigation Commission (UNIIIC), whose mandate ended on 28 February 2009.

== Jurisdiction ==
The Tribunal was established to "try all those who are found responsible for the [February 14th, 2005] terrorist crime which killed the former Lebanese Prime Minister Rafic Hariri and others." Its jurisdiction could be extended beyond that event to other attacks in Lebanon between 1 October 2004 and 12 December 2005, if there was sufficient evidence showing they were connected and of a similar nature and gravity to the 14 February attack. Human Rights Watch had argued that the tribunal should have been given jurisdiction over 14 other attacks perpetrated in Lebanon since 1 October 2004. The Tribunal is the first of the UN-based international criminal court to try a terrorist crime committed against a specific person.

== Mandate ==
The Tribunal's mandate was initially set for three years, but has been extended by the UN Secretary-General (in consultation with the Government of Lebanon and the Security Council) to allow the Tribunal to complete its work. In 2015, UN Secretary-General Ban Ki-moon "reaffirmed the commitment of the UN to support the work of the Tribunal to bring those responsible to justice and to ensure that impunity for such major crimes will not be tolerated," and extended the Tribunal's mandate until 2018. The mandate may be further extended if cases are still ongoing.

== Applicable law ==
The Tribunal applies Lebanese criminal law, with judges guided by both the Lebanese Code of Criminal Procedure and other materials reflecting the highest standards of international criminal procedure.

Accordingly, it also is similar to Section I for War Crimes and Section II for Organized Crime, Economic Crime and Corruption of the Criminal and Appellate Divisions of the Court of Bosnia and Herzegovina which has such "hybrid" chambers, as well as to the Special Court for Sierra Leone and the Extraordinary Chambers in the Courts of Cambodia (ECCC).

== Structure and staff ==
The STL is composed of four organs: Chambers, which consists of a Pre-Trial Judge, a Trial Chamber, and an Appeals Chamber; the Registry, responsible for the administration of the Tribunal; the Office of the Prosecutor; and the Defense Office. The STL Statute also allows for victims to participate in the proceedings, through legal representatives. In the administrative structure of the Tribunal, victim participation falls under the Registry.

=== Chambers ===
The Chambers are composed of an international Pre-Trial Judge, three Trial Chamber judges (one Lebanese and two international), five Appeals Chamber judges (two Lebanese and three international), and two alternate judges (one Lebanese and one international). The alternate judges may be assigned by the Tribunal President (at the request of the presiding judge of the Trial Chamber) to be present at each stage of the trial, and replace a judge who is unable to continue sitting.

Judges are appointed by the Secretary-General of the United Nations for a three-year period, which can be renewed.

Both the Trial Chamber and the Appeals Chamber elect a presiding judge to conduct the proceedings. The presiding judge of the Appeals Chamber is also the President of the Special Tribunal. The term of the President is normally one and a half years.

The President has a number of functions and responsibilities, including coordinating the work of the Chambers to ensure the effective functioning of the Tribunal and good administration of justice; supervising the activities of the Registry; issuing Practice Directions (in consultation with the Council of Judges, Registrar, Head of Defence Office, and Prosecutor); and representing the Tribunal in international relations. The President is also responsible for submitting an annual report on the Tribunal's activities to the Secretary-General of the United Nations and the Government of Lebanon.

The first President of the Tribunal was the late Antonio Cassese. Following his resignation, Cassese was succeeded by Sir David Baragwanath, elected on 10 October 2011. Baragwanath was succeeded by Judge Ivana Hrdličková, who was elected on 19 February 2015. She was re-elected on 4 July 2016.

The Appeals Chamber also elects a vice-president for a one-and-a-half-year term. The vice-president exercises the President's functions when the President is absent or unable to act, and any other function delegated by the President.

Lebanese Judge Ralph Riachi has been vice-president of the Tribunal since it opened in 2009, and was most recently re-elected on 4 July 2016.

==== Judges ====
Name	State	Position(s)	Term began	Term ended
David Baragwanath	New Zealand	Appeals chamber judge / President (former)	25 March 2009	In office
Kjell Björnberg	Sweden	Appeals chamber judge	25 March 2009	16 January 2013
Antonio Cassese	Italy	Appeals chamber judge / President (former)	25 March 2009	1 October 2011
Afif Chamseddine	Lebanon	Appeals chamber judge	25 March 2009	In office
Daniel Fransen	Belgium	Pre-trial judge	25 March 2009	In office
Ralph Riachi	Lebanon	Appeals chamber judge / Vice-president (current)	25 March 2009	In office
Walid Akoum	Lebanon	Trial chamber judge / Trial chamber judge (alternate)	20 September 2011	In office
Micheline Braidy	Lebanon	Trial chamber judge	20 September 2011	In office
Janet Nosworthy	Jamaica	Trial chamber judge	20 September 2011	In office
David Re	Australia	Trial chamber judge	20 September 2011	In office
Robert Roth	Switzerland	Trial chamber judge	20 September 2011	10 September 2013
Daniel Nsereko	Uganda	Appeals chamber judge	12 March 2012	In office
Ivana Hrdličková	Czech Republic	Appeals chamber judge / President (current)	16 January 2013	In office
Nicola Lettieri	Italy	Trial chamber judge / Trial chamber judge (alternate)	15 January 2014	In office
Anna Bednarek	Poland	Trial chamber judge	27 November 2019	In office

=== Registry ===
The Registry is responsible for administering and servicing the Tribunal, under the authority of the President and the direction of the Registrar.

The Registry's Judicial Division ensures the efficient functioning of hearings, and consists of the Court Management and Services Section, Victims and Witnesses Unit, Victims' Participation Unit, Language Services Section, Detention Facility, and Information Services Section. The Registry's Division of Administration provides administrative services to the whole Tribunal, and includes the Human and Financial Resources Services Section, Budget Unit, Procurement Section, and the General Services Section. The Registry's Security and Safety Section provides security for the Tribunal's personnel, facilities, assets and programmes.

The Registrar is appointed by the United Nations Secretary-General for a three-year term, which can be renewed. Ban Ki-moon appointed Robin Vincent as the first Registrar of the Tribunal on 11 March 2008. He oversaw the 'start-up phase' of STL, successfully guiding the court to its first public broadcast.

Following Vincent's sudden resignation, Ban appointed David Tolbert as Registrar on 9 July 2009, to assume the post effective 26 August 2009.

Herman von Hebel was appointed as acting Registrar on 1 March 2010 and as Registrar on 10 December 2010. Current Registrar Daryl A. Mundis was appointed acting Registrar on 18 April 2013 and Registrar on 24 July 2013.

==== Victims ====
According to the STL Statute, where their personal interests are affected, victims shall be allowed to present their views during the proceedings, so matter as this is not inconsistent with and does not prejudice the rights of the accused to a fair and impartial trial. Victims participate through designated legal representatives.

Victims are entitled to receive case-related documents and may be permitted to call witnesses and tender evidence at trial. They may also be heard at the sentencing and appeal stages.

The Victims' Participation Unit (VPU), a unit of the Registry, helps victims participate in the proceedings by developing strategies for participation, informing victims of their rights, receiving applications for participation, distributing case filings to victims, informing them of relevant decisions, and providing other logistical and administrative assistance. The VPU also maintains a list of eligible counsel to represent victims, administers legal aid to indigent victims, provides legal support and advice to victims and their legal representatives, and provides training to legal representatives of victims as necessary.

The Legal Representatives of Victims are Peter Haynes (lead legal representative), Mohammad Mattar (co-legal representative), and Nada Abd El Sater Abu Samra (co-legal representative).

=== Office of the Prosecutor ===
The Prosecutor is responsible for the investigation and prosecution of persons responsible for crimes falling under the Tribunal's jurisdiction.

According to the Agreement between the United Nations and the Lebanese Republic on the establishment of a Special Tribunal for Lebanon, the Prosecutor continues the investigations begun by the United Nations International Independent Investigation Commission. In conducting the investigations, the Prosecutor obtains statements from witnesses, collects evidence, and conducts on-site investigations. The Prosecutor works in cooperation with the relevant Lebanese authorities in carrying out these tasks.

While the Prosecutor acts independently in the conduct of his investigation, he must obtain the authorisation of the Pre-Trial Judge of the Tribunal to undertake compulsory investigative measures, such as orders and warrants for the arrest or transfer of persons.

Once the Prosecutor reaches the conclusion that there is sufficient evidence of the commission of a crime by an individual to justify the filing of an indictment, and that it is in the public interest to do so, he or she presents the indictment setting out the charges to the Pre-Trial Judge for confirmation. If the judge is satisfied that the evidence is at first glance sufficient to support the charges, he or she will confirm the indictment and the matter will go to trial.

During trial, the Prosecutor is responsible for presenting witnesses and evidence in order to prove the allegations made in the indictment beyond a reasonable doubt.

The Prosecutor is appointed by the United Nations Secretary-General for a three-year term, which can be renewed. The Prosecutor is assisted by a Lebanese Deputy Prosecutor.

Daniel Bellemare was appointed as the first Prosecutor on 14 November 2007, and was sworn in when the Tribunal opened in March 2009. Current Prosecutor Norman Farrell was appointed on 29 February 2012.

Lebanese lawyer Joyce Tabet assumed the position of Deputy Prosecutor of the Court on 1 November 2009.

=== Defence ===
==== Defence office ====
The STL is the first international tribunal to have a Defence Office that is independent of the Registry, on par with the Office of the Prosecutor. Other tribunals have had defence offices, but in contrast to the independent Offices of the Prosecutor, these offices are not independent and fall under the administration of other organs of the Court. The Defence Office does not represent any accused, but instead exists to ensure the protection of the accused's rights and to make the exercise of these rights effective, an essential requirement for a fair trial.

The Head of Defence Office is appointed by the United Nations Secretary-General, in consultation with the President of the Tribunal. The Head of Defence Office is responsible for appointing Office staff and drawing up a list of defence counsel. The Defence Office is mandated to protect the rights of the defence and support defence counsel and persons entitled to legal assistance (including research, evidence collection, and advice).

François Roux was sworn in as Head of the Defence Office in March 2009, and he remains in the role.

In September 2010, Lebanese-French lawyer Alia Aoun was appointed as Deputy Head of Defence Office. Current Deputy Head Héleyn Uñac was appointed on an interim basis in May 2012 and was formally appointed in May 2014.

==== Defence counsel ====
All suspects and accused persons have the right to be represented by their own counsel before the STL. Each accused in the Ayyash et al. case, for example, has his own defence counsel and team. Defence counsel are responsible for all aspects of the case.

Defence counsel are independent of the Tribunal, but are supported by the Defence Office.

== Budget ==
Lebanon contributes 49% of the Tribunal's budget, while the remaining 51% comes from voluntary contributions. Since 2009, 28 countries and the European Union have contributed to the Tribunal, either through voluntary contributions or in-kind support. These countries include Lebanon, Australia, Austria, Belgium, Canada, Croatia, the Czech Republic, Denmark, Finland, France, Germany, Hungary, Ireland, Italy, Japan, Luxembourg, the Netherlands, New Zealand, the Russian Federation, Sweden, Macedonia, Turkey, the United Kingdom, the United States of America, Uruguay and other states. The budget has been slightly under €60 million in recent years, but increased slightly in 2016 due in part to the strengthening of the US dollar against the euro.

In September 2007, UN Secretary-General Ban Ki-moon estimated that the Tribunal would cost US$120 million over three years. During the Opening Ceremony for the Tribunal, which was held on 1 March 2009, UN officials indicated that contributions were in hand to cover the estimated costs of the first year (US$51.4 million). Eventually, the investigation and trial cost nearly $1 billion, of which Lebanon paid 49% while other nations paid the rest.

The 2020 budget for the STL was €55m, followed by a 37% cut in 2021, in which $15.5m were paid by the United Nations on behalf of Lebanon in March 2021. In June 2021, it was reported that the STL would cease operations by July, due to funding shortages. Hence, the Lebanese caretaker prime minister, Hassan Diab, wrote a letter to the UN, urging them to find new funding methods.

Year	Budget
2009	$51.4m
2010	$55.4m
2011	$65.7m
2012	€55.3m
2013	€59.9m
2014	€59.9m
2015	€59.9m
2016	€62.8m
Total (8 years)	around US$466 million (based on yearly average €/$ exchange rates)

== Venue ==
=== Leidschendam, Netherlands ===
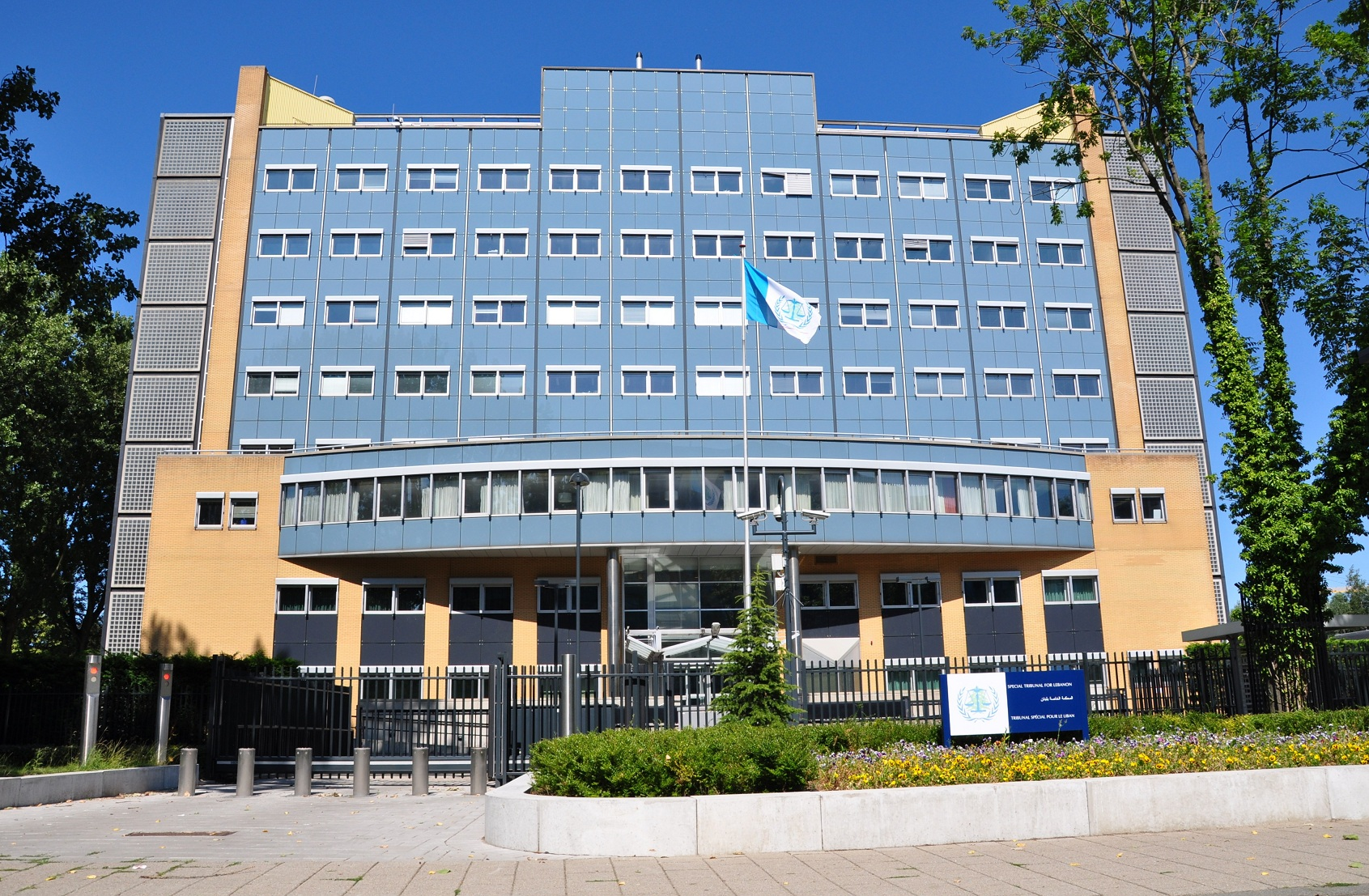
The tribunal building in Leidschendam, Netherlands

For reasons of security, administrative efficiency and fairness, the Tribunal has its seat outside Lebanon, in Leidschendam, on the outskirts of The Hague, the Netherlands. The premises of the Tribunal are the former headquarters of the Dutch General Intelligence and Security Service. They returned to Leidschendam after the tribunal ceased operations in 2023, as a secondary office.

The STL courtroom served as a courtroom for the Charles Taylor trial before the Special Court for Sierra Leone from 2010 to 2012.

=== Beirut, Lebanon ===
The Tribunal also maintains an office in Beirut, where its Outreach and Legacy Section is based.

== Cases ==
=== Ayyash et al. ===
==== Investigation ====
Eleven days after the assassination, a fact-finding mission sent by the Secretary-General of the United Nations and led by Irish Deputy Police Commissioner Peter FitzGerald set to work investigating the causes, circumstances, and consequences of the attack. On 24 March 2005 the fact-finding mission submitted its report, recommending an independent international investigation be launched.

UN Security Council Resolution 1595 (2005) established the United Nations International Independent Investigation Commission (UNIIIC) on 7 April 2005. The purpose of the commission was to gather evidence and to assist the Lebanese authorities in their investigation of the attack of 14 February 2005. The UNIIIC investigated the Hariri assassination for four years before the STL was established, gathering evidence and assisting the Lebanese authorities with their investigations.

The UNIIIC's tenth report was submitted to the Security Council on 28 March 2008. Commissioner Daniel Bellemare stated "that a network of individuals acted in concert to carry out the assassination of Rafic Hariri” and that this network was also connected to other cases falling under the UNIIIC's mandate. The UNIIIC completed its mandate on 28 February 2009, handing over its work to the STL.

The United Nations investigation initially implicated high-level Lebanese and Syrian security officers in Hariri's killing. Damascus denied involvement. Four pro-Syrian Lebanese generals were detained by the Lebanese authorities for four years without charge in connection with Hariri's killing. One of the first acts of the Tribunal was to order the release of the generals after ruling that there was insufficient evidence to justify their detention.

In October 2010, STL investigators carried out a "controlled explosion" at an air force base in Captieux, France to replicate "an explosion in order to carry out forensic tests." However, the STL said the explosion was not a full-scale reconstruction of the assassination.

==== Indictment ====
The first indictment was confidentially submitted on 17 January 2011 to Pre-Trial Judge Daniel Fransen. The STL released a statement at the time saying that "the Prosecutor of the tribunal has submitted an indictment and supporting materials to the Pre-Trial Judge... The contents of the indictment remain confidential at this stage." On 11 March, the Prosecutor filed an amended indictment, with media speculating that it could name senior as well as rank and file Hezbollah members.

In reaction to the submission, U.S. President Barack Obama welcomed the first indictment saying it could end an "era of impunity" and that it was "a significant and emotional time for the Lebanese people" and that "the U.S. were joining the international community in calling on all leaders and factions to preserve calm and exercise restraint." Lebanon's Foreign Minister Ali Al Shami responded to him, saying that the US should cease interfering in Lebanon's affairs, while he summoned the U.S. Ambassador Maura Connelly to a meeting with a "key undecided lawmaker" Nicolas Fattouch. The embassy named the meeting "a part of routine meetings with personalities from across Lebanon's political spectrum."

The indictment was confirmed on 28 June 2011 and arrest warrants for the four accused issued two days later. The warrants were submitted to the Lebanese authorities, but the accused were not publicly identified by the Tribunal itself until a month later. The full indictment was unsealed that August.

In the meantime, before the official announcement, Lebanese media and the Interior Minister of Lebanon reported that warrants had been issued for members of Hezbollah's assassination unit, Unit 121, namely Mustafa Badreddine, Salim al-Ayyash, Assad Sabra, and Hassan Oneissi. On 3 July, Hezbollah leader Hassan Nasrallah rejected the indictment and vowed that the accused individuals would not be arrested under any circumstances by any government. Nasrallah also denounced the Tribunal as a foreign plot against his party, while dismissing fears of internal strife or civil war, stating that the country's new government would ensure stability. Rafic Hariri's son, Saad, considered the indictments an "historic moment."

==== Trial ====
Prosecution case

Following considerable efforts by Lebanese authorities to locate and arrest the individuals named in the warrants, including dozens of visits to known addresses, public advertisements, and extensive media coverage of the indictment, on 1 February 2012, the Trial Chamber determined that "Mr Ayyash, Mr Badreddine, Mr Oneissi and Mr Sabra cannot be found and that each has absconded and does not wish to participate in a trial despite being informed of the charges and the possible ways of participating in the trial." In the interests of justice, the Trial Chamber, therefore, decided that the trial would proceed in absentia, or without the presence of the accused, in accordance with Lebanese law.

The Pre-Trial Judge granted the first victims "participating victim" status on 8 May 2012. Three Legal Representatives of Victims were subsequently sworn in to represent them in the proceedings.

The Prosecutor v. Ayyash et al., the first trial before the Tribunal, began on 16 January 2014 with an opening statement from the Prosecution.

On 11 February 2014, the Trial Chamber ordered the Merhi case joined with the Ayyash et al. case. An adjournment of the trial was subsequently ordered to allow Merhi's counsel adequate preparation time.

Following the adjournment to allow the Defence adequate time to prepare, proceedings resumed on 18 June 2014.

On 13 May 2016, media reported that Mustafa Badreddine, one of the accused in Ayyash et al., had been killed in Damascus, Syria. Proceedings against Badreddine were terminated on 11 July 2016. The Prosecution filed an amended indictment the following day.

As of August 2017, the Prosecution continues its presentation of its case-in-chief.

Victims' case

On 31 July 2017, the Trial Chamber tentatively scheduled the presentation of the victims' case for the week of 28 August 2017. Seven victims and a non-victim witness were authorized to testify, while a decision on whether to allow a second non-victim witness to testify was deferred to a later date. The Trial Chamber directed that the presentation of the victims case "be interposed before the formal close of the Prosecutor's case," meaning the Prosecution case will continue after the victims complete their presentation of evidence. The Legal Representatives of Victims has estimated the presentation of evidence would take approximately two weeks of court time.

=== Connected cases ===
The Tribunal has determined that three attacks relating to Lebanese politicians Marwan Hamadeh, George Hawi and Elias El-Murr are connected to the 14 February 2005 attack, and has established jurisdiction over them. The Pre-Trial Judge has ordered that the Lebanese authorities provide the relevant files to the STL Prosecutor. The cases remain under investigation, and no indictments have been issued.

=== Other cases ===
When the Ayyash et al. indictment was confirmed on 28 June 2011, the Pre-Trial Judge ordered material related to the indictment be kept confidential. On 25 May 2012 he ordered that "all third parties to the proceedings not to disseminate material in the proceedings of which they may have knowledge or any information contained therein, which may be subject to a protective measure, unless that material or information becomes public during open session proceedings." Two journalists and two media companies were subsequently charged with violating the order.

==== STL-14-05 ====
In April 2015, Lebanese journalist Karma Khayat and Al-Jadeed TV went on trial, accused of "knowingly and wilfully interfering with the administration of justice" over August 2012 broadcasts relating to alleged confidential witnesses in the Hariri case. The accused faced a maximum penalty of seven years in jail or a fine of €100,000 ($105,780), or both. This was the first time a company was indicted by an international court. On 18 September 2015, Khayyat was convicted of failing to remove information on supposedly confidential witnesses from Al Jadeed's website and YouTube channel, while Al Jadeed was found not guilty. Both accused were found not guilty of broadcasting and/or publishing information on supposedly confidential witnesses. Khayat was sentenced to a €10,000 fine. The conviction was reversed on 8 March 2016.

==== STL-14-06 ====
In a separate case, Ibrahim Al Amin and Akhbar Beirut were both found guilty of knowingly and wilfully interfering with the administration of justice by publishing information on alleged confidential witnesses in the Ayyash et al. case in July 2016. Al Amin was sentenced to a €20,000 fine and Akhbar Beirut to a €6,000 fine. They did not appeal the judgment.

=== Indictees ===
The list below details the counts against each individual or corporation indicted in the Tribunal and his or her current status. The column titled TA lists the number of counts of acts of terrorism with which an individual has been charged. MIA the number of counts of membership in illicit associations, FRC the number of counts of failure to report crimes, IH the number of crimes of intentional homicide, CPI the number of crimes of causing personal injuries, and C the number of crimes of contempt of the Tribunal and crimes against the administration of justice. Note that these are the counts with which an individual was indicted, not convicted.

Name	Indicted	TA	MIA	FRC	IH	CPI	C	Detained	Current status	Ind.
Salim Ayyash (Note: A second indictment was confirmed against Salim Ayyash in another case on 15 May 2019; in that case he is a fugitive and the case is in the pre-trial phase of in absentia proceedings.)	28 June 2011	4	1	—	5	—	—	In absentia	Fugitive; sentenced to life imprisonment in absentia; reported to have died in November 2024	
Mustafa Badreddine	28 June 2011	2	—	—	3	—	—	In absentia	Died on 13 May 2016; proceedings terminated on 12 July 2016	
Hussein Oneissi	28 June 2011	2	—	—	3	—	—	In absentia	Fugitive; sentenced to life imprisonment in absentia	
Assad Sabra	28 June 2011	2	—	—	3	—	—	In absentia	Acquitted on 8 August 2020	
Hassan Merhi	31 July 2013	2	—	—	3	—	—	In absentia	Fugitive; sentenced to life imprisonment in absentia	
Akhbar Beirut S.A.L.	31 January 2014	—	—	—	—	—	1	Summoned	Sentenced to €6,000 fine	
Ibrahim al-Amin	31 January 2014	—	—	—	—	—	1	Summoned	Completed sentence of €20,000 fine on 14 August 2018	
Al Jadeed S.A.L. / New T.V. S.A.L.	31 January 2014	—	—	—	—	—	2	Summoned	Acquitted on 18 September 2015	
Karma Khayat	31 January 2014	—	—	—	—	—	2	Summoned	Acquitted on 8 March 2016	

== Outreach and legacy ==
Given the importance of providing timely and accurate information to the Lebanese public, the STL is the first international tribunal to require the establishment of a dedicated outreach unit in its Statute or Rules of Procedure and Evidence. The Outreach and Legacy Unit, part of the Public Information and Communications Section within the Registry, is based in Beirut, Lebanon. From there, it engages with legal professionals, government, academics, students and civil society organisations in order to communicate the Tribunal's work to the Lebanese and global public and seek feedback. The Outreach and Legacy Unit therefore works in partnership with Lebanese universities, Bar Associations and NGOs to organise lectures, conferences, symposia, and roundtable discussions on topics related to the STL's mandate and general topics in international criminal justice throughout the year.

The STL's Public Affairs Unit, based in Leidschendam, Netherlands, is also part of the Public Information and Communications Section and is responsible for creating and disseminating public information. It supports the STL's outreach activities by organizing events and visits to the Tribunal by journalists, judges, students, state officials, academics, and others.

=== Inter-University Programme on International Criminal Law and Procedure ===
The STL and the T.M.C. Asser Instituut jointly organize an Inter-University Programme on International Criminal Law and Procedure for senior Lebanese undergraduates (and some graduate students), in partnership with Lebanese-based universities. Students from nearly a dozen Lebanese universities follow 15 lectures on international criminal law and procedure from prominent academic experts and practitioners. Topics include the history of the law of the international tribunals; sources of international criminal (procedural) law; the substantive law of genocide, crimes against humanity, war crimes and terrorism; general legal principles (modes of liability, rights of the accused, role of victims); jurisdiction, admissibility and complementarity; and international criminal proceedings (pre-trial, trial, judgment, appeal and sentencing). Over 800 Lebanese students have completed the program since it began in 2011. Each year, a group of students achieving the highest grades in the program are awarded a study trip to the seat of the STL in The Hague, Netherlands to visit the STL and neighbouring judicial institutions. In 2016, a competition was organized to encourage program alumni to share their knowledge with younger Lebanese by conducting presentations on the STL to high school students.

=== NGO training ===
In 2014, the STL organized training to help non-governmental organizations in Lebanon to better monitor and follow international criminal proceedings, particularly those of the STL. Training took place in Beirut, Lebanon and The Hague, Netherlands and included interactive sessions with over 20 trial monitoring experts. Fifteen organizations took part.

=== Lawyer training ===
The STL and the Institute for Human Rights at the Beirut Bar Association, supported by Friedrich-Ebert-Stiftung, organize annual training for lawyers on criminal procedures before international courts. The program includes a mock trial where lawyers can work directly on issues involving international criminal law. Approximately 25 lawyers are trained each year.

=== Publications ===
As part of its outreach efforts, the STL publishes a number of publications to help the public, journalists, and other interested parties follow its work.

==== Translation of Antonio Cassese's International Criminal Law into Arabic ====
In 2015, the STL launched the Arabic translation of the late STL President (and Judge) Antonio Cassese's foundational textbook, International Criminal Law. The project, initiated by the STL, was sponsored by the Embassy of Switzerland in Lebanon and Sader Legal Publishers in Lebanon. This was the first full textbook on international criminal law published in Arabic.

==== Glossary of legal terms ====
In 2012, the STL's Outreach and Legacy Unit published a Glossary of Legal Terms in Arabic, English, and French, defining fundamental concepts related to international criminal law and to the STL itself in the three official languages of the Tribunal.

==== Other publications ====
The STL publishes a monthly bulletin providing updates about the latest developments and news. The STL has also produced 130 short question-and-answer videos in Arabic, English, and French to explain its progress and unique features.

=== Other activities ===
Trial proceedings are streamed on the STL website with a thirty-minute delay. The STL organizes regular briefings and courtroom tours for the public. In the reporting year 2015–2016, 1,554 visitors from 94 countries attended organized group visits.

== Controversies ==
=== Mass resignations ===
Robin Vincent resigned as the SLT Registrar in 2009 for what he described as the tribunal "not meeting the highest international standards in the field of criminal justice". The appointment of David Tolbert in July 2009 as his replacement did not provide any stability however, as the STL saw a rash of key resignations take place, including prosecution Spokesperson Radiya Ashouri, her successor, Henrietta Aswad, Judge Howard Morrison, Chief Investigator Naguib Kaldas, Assistant Chief Prosecutor, Bernard Cote, Chief of Public Affairs, Peter Wickwire Foster, Registry spokesperson Suzann Khan, her successor Dr. Fatima el Issawi and, just eight months after his appointment, Tolbert himself, leaving the credibility of the tribunal an open question before the first trial had even begun.

=== Alleged Syrian involvement ===
The UN investigation into the assassination and the subsequent establishment of the STL provoked controversy and tension in Lebanon between different political groups, particularly the anti-Syrian March 14 Alliance and the pro-Syrian March 8 Alliance. Allegations of Syrian involvement in the attack and the indictment of Hezbollah members angered pro-Syria factions in Lebanon at the time.

Given the context in which the assassination of Hariri occurred (including reported threats to Hariri by Syrian president Bashar al-Assad in their last meeting and the attempted assassination of Lebanese politician Marwan Hamadeh, who had resisted Syrian demands, the previous October), Syrian involvement was immediately suspected.

In the hours following the blast, individuals with strong ties to the Syrian government attempted to guide the Lebanese investigation toward a 22-year-old man of Palestinian origin named Ahmed Abu Addas. That theory was quickly discredited.

On 30 August 2005, four pro-Syrian Lebanese generals (some of whom had promoted the false Abu Addas theory) were subsequently arrested under suspicion of conspiracy to commit murder. They were detained without charge by Lebanese authorities for four years and released by the STL when it took over the investigation in 2009. Mustafa Hamdan, former head of the Lebanese Presidential Guard brigade; Jamil al Sayyed, former Director-General of Security General; Ali al Hajj, director general of the Lebanese Internal Security Forces; and Raymond Azar, the former director of the Military Intelligence were released upon an order from the STL Pre-Trial Judge at the request of the Prosecutor due to lack of evidence. In making the request, the Prosecutor had considered "inconsistencies in the statements of key witnesses and of a lack of corroborative evidence to support these statements".

In September 2010, Saad Hariri told the pan-Arab newspaper Asharq al-Awsat that "[a]t a certain stage we made mistakes and accused Syria of assassinating the martyred premier. This was a political accusation, and this political accusation has finished." He added that "[t]he tribunal is not linked to the political accusations, which were hasty... The tribunal will only look at evidence".

According to Al-Manar, a Hezbollah-affiliated Lebanese television station, Syrian President Bashar al-Assad said Syria had been vindicated as most Lebanese did not believe Syria was responsible anymore since they had been misled. Within Lebanon, however, many Lebanese believe that Assad had Hariri killed because the latter demanded freedom from Syrian interference and occupation.

=== False witnesses ===
"False witnesses" refer to witnesses who gave statements to UNIIIC investigators that were inconsistent and not corroborated by evidence. Critics consider that the "false witnesses" damaged the credibility of the STL, while Tribunal supporters believe the witnesses may have been planted to discredit the investigation.

Two "false witnesses," Mohammad Zuheir Siddiq and Husam Taher Husam, identified themselves as former Syrian intelligence officers and alleged top-level Syrian involvement in the killing of Hariri. Siddiq further accused Hezbollah personnel of "logistical involvement" in the murder.

In 2009, the STL Prosecution declared that the so-called false witnesses were no longer of interest to the Tribunal. Siddiq subsequently went into hiding in Europe.

The false witnesses issue sparked fierce political debate in Lebanon, with virtually all political leaders weighing in. Sheikh Hassan Nasrallah, Secretary-General of Hezbollah, accused the STL and the UN of protecting the false witnesses and called for Siddiq to be arrested. The Lebanese government appointed Justice Minister Ibrahim Najjar to study the issue.

However, there were some prominent witnesses who testified on the political situation in Lebanon preceding Hariri's assassination, including: Marwan Hamade, Walid Jumblatt, Fouad Siniora and Jamil al Sayyed.

==== General Jamil al Sayyed controversy ====
After the assassination of Rafic Hariri in 2005, four generals, including Jamil al Sayyed, were detained for suspected involvement. The STL ordered the Lebanese authorities to release the generals when it was established in 2009, after the testimony of the "false witnesses," the basis for the generals' detention, was discredited.

Saying that he lacked faith in the Lebanese judiciary, which had detained him for four years, al Sayyed filed a lawsuit in Damascus, Syria in December 2009, accusing Lebanese authorities of covering up for the "false witnesses". After repeated summons by Syria for the accused false witnesses were ignored, al-Sayyed's lawyer, Fasih al-Ashi, said a Syrian court issued more than 30 warrants against judges, officers, politicians and journalists from various Arab countries. Syria's Foreign Minister, Walid Muallem, however, said the warrants were "purely procedural."

In 2010, al Sayyed requested that the STL Prosecutor disclose to him documents regarding his detention in Lebanon prior to the STL's establishment, including documents related to the "false witnesses."

Soon after, in a press conference, al Sayyed attacked Prime Minister Saad Hariri, Rafic Hariri's son, calling on him to "take a lie detector test to prove he did not support or fund false witnesses in the Special Tribunal for Lebanon". He further called on the younger Hariri to "admit that he sold his father’s blood for four years in order to implement a new Middle East project.” Al Sayyed directed further comments at Saad Hariri by stating, "After all you have done to Syria, Bashar Assad hugged you rather than hanging you to death" and adding, "It's not enough for Hariri to admit that he erred, he has to pay the price of his mistakes". He also suggested that then-Prosecutor Daniel Bellemare should have summoned Hariri's political, security and judicial team and questioned them, then called on him and then STL President Antonio Cassese to resign. Al Sayyed alleged that despite some witnesses changing their testimony or having been found to be lying, the STL did not want to prosecute anyone as a false witness because "big heads would roll". After he accused Saad Hariri of supporting the "false witnesses," on 12 September 2010, he called for Hariri to be held accountable or "I will do it someday with my own hands. The Lebanese people must unite against this [government] and topple it, even if by force." Al Sayyed was subsequently summoned by Lebanese authorities for questioning over "threats against the Lebanese state". Al Sayyed refused to respond to the summons, stating he "would not appear before any court unless Saeed Mirza, Lebanon’s general prosecutor, is dismissed."

Al Sayyed subsequently filed a request with STL President Judge Cassese asking him to disqualify the STL Vice-president Judge Ralph Riachy from the proceedings because of the latter's involvement in his "arbitrary detention, the thing that raises questions about his integrity and impartiality." The request was denied.

During oral hearings, al Sayyed criticized the STL for not prosecuting the false witnesses and said that a conspiracy was involved in the investigation of the assassination.

On 12 May 2011, the STL Pre-Trial Judge ordered more than 270 documents to be released to al Sayyed to allow him to pursue his claim for wrongful detention in the Lebanese national courts.

=== Early rumours about suspects' Hezbollah links ===
On 23 May 2009, Der Spiegel revealed that after investigations into mobile phones that seemed to follow Rafic Hariri in the days leading up to the attack and on the day of the assassination, (Note: Lebanese police captain Wissam Eid, who was assassinated in 2008, had uncovered five groups of cellphones involving scores of operatives related the assassination plot.) investigators believed that Hezbollah forces planned and executed the attack. The article did not state the names of specific individuals who would be indicted.

The rumours caused considerable political controversy in Lebanon. Prime Minister Saad Hariri vowed "not to allow my father's blood to stir disunity in Lebanon." In 2010, when media reported that senior Hezbollah operative Mustafa Badreddine was the main suspect, Hariri reportedly asked the Tribunal to postpone the announcement because of the potentially-incendiary implications for Lebanon.

==== Issuance of indictment ====
In September 2010, Prosecutor Daniel Bellemare stated that the indictment had not been drafted yet and would not be filed until he was satisfied there was enough evidence: "the impact of going too fast would be much worse. As I said before: The indictment has to be based on solid evidence". Around the same time, Head of the Defence Office Francois Roux pointed out that an indictment was not a final decision or verdict and that in international criminal law (as in domestic criminal law), one could be found innocent even after an indictment. The STL in The Hague refused to discuss either political alliance's approach to the tribunal. Al Akhbar reported that following pressure from the United States on its Lebanese allies not to bargain over the STL, it would issue its first round of indictments in March 2011.

The confidential indictment was filed on 17 January 2011 and confirmed on 28 June 2011. The identities of those indicted were not officially revealed until a month later, and the full indictment was not unsealed until August. In the meantime, prior to the official announcement, the media had widely reported that Hezbollah members Mustafa Badreddine, Salim al-Ayyash, Assad Sabra and Hassan Oneissi had been charged.

=== Tensions and political debate in Lebanon ===
Reacting to rumours that Hezbollah members would be indicted for Hariri's assassination, Hezbollah leader Hassan Nasrallah condemned the investigation as an Israeli project intended to escalate tensions in Lebanon and that any indictment of a Hezbollah member could destabilise the unity of the government. He also said he would resist any attempt to arrest even "half a member" of the party. He had previously questioned the alleged funding for the STL.

Others reacted differently. Maronite patriarch Nasrallah Sfeir called the STL "fair and righteous."

With rhetoric escalating on all sides, many political leaders in Lebanon worried that the indictment of Hezbollah members could destabilize the country and lead to civil strife.

==== Visit of international leaders ====
On 30 July 2010, Syrian President Bashar al-Assad, Saudi King Abdullah and Qatari Emir Sheikh Hamad bin Khalifa al-Thani visited Lebanon to calm tensions. It was Assad's first visit to Lebanon since Hariri's assassination. The meeting was praised as symbolic but crucial to avoiding violence. Hezbollah-affiliated news station Al-Manar hailed the visit and said Lebanon remained divided over the STL's course of action.

==== Debate continues ====
Still, tensions remained. In September 2010, As-Safir surveyed Lebanese opinion on the STL and documents that Nasrallah had submitted purporting to show the involvement of Israel in the assassination. The results showed that 60% believed the international probe was politicised, unfair and biased, and 43% supported an amendment in the method and the style of the investigation to be more impartial and neutral; 17% also called for a complete abolition of the STL; 55% viewed the documents submitted by Nasrallah as convincing evidence of the suspicion of Israel. Almost half the respondents (49%) also said that they did not want to accuse any side in the killing, while 34% considered Israel to be behind the assassination and 5% accused the CIA and Mossad.

The same month, Suleiman Frangieh warned that indictments against Hezbollah could mean "there is war in Lebanon... and today the atmosphere is just waiting for a spark. If the international tribunal [issues] a 'sectarian' decision, then yes, why don't we cancel it?” He also suggested the STL was undermining Lebanon's stability instead of maintaining justice. Walid Jumblatt also expressed "fears [of] the dangerous repercussions" of an indictment during a visit to Syria. Syria's Foreign Minister, Walid Muallem, also expressed concern about the situation saying it was coordinating with Saudi Arabia over the "worrisome situation," but he added that "Lebanon alone can remove the factors that are causing instability." He also said "Whoever is interested in Lebanon's stability should work on preventing the tribunal's politicization." In September 2010, a Hezbollah MP told the parliamentary Finance and Budget Commission that the Tribunal should be abolished by the end of the month "otherwise the matter will be very dangerous." Around the same time, Saad Hariri reiterated his support for a "strategic relationship" with Syria and also said he would not back down from supporting the Special Tribunal for Lebanon.

UN reaction

In reaction to attacks on the Tribunal, then-United Nations Secretary-General Ban Ki-moon called on political leaders in Lebanon not to interfere in the STL's affairs. However, he refused to discuss the status of the STL after Saad Hariri's acknowledgement of false witnesses. He told the press that the STL had made progress, while saying the Tribunal was independent, and "should not be associated with any political statements," adding that the Tribunal was "not in danger." Citing the STL's "independence" and dismissing fears of violence, he said "I want to be perfectly clear. This tribunal... [has] a clear mandate from the Security Council to uncover the truth and end impunity. I urge all Lebanese and regional parties not to prejudge the outcome, nor to interfere in the tribunal's work. ... It will go on."

Fall of government

The Lebanese government collapsed in January 2011 after 11 cabinet ministers aligned with the March 8 alliance, and one presidential appointee, withdrew over Prime Minister Saad Hariri's refusal to reject the STL. Six months later a new government was formed composed of 8 March members and the former 14 March's Progressive Socialist Party under Prime Minister Najib Mikati, after the latter won a majority of votes in parliament.

=== Hezbollah accusations against Israel ===
Following Israel's Channel 1 announcement of the names and positions of alleged suspects, Hezbollah's news outlet, Al-Manar, opined that the Special Tribunal for Lebanon was an opportunity for Israel to achieve its 'unachieved' goals in Lebanon.

In a news conference on 9 August 2010, Hezbollah Secretary General Hassan Nasrallah denied Hezbollah's involvement in the assassination and claimed to have evidence that Israel was behind the attack. This allegedly included an audio recording of an alleged Israeli agent and intercepted Israeli aerial drone footage of the route Hariri took before the explosion. Nasrallah stated that Israel wanted to assassinate Hariri to create political chaos and force Syria to withdraw from Lebanon.

Following the press conference, the STL Prosecution "requested Lebanese authorities to provide all the information in possession of" Nasrallah, including video material showed at the news conference and "any other material that would be of assistance to the Office of the Prosecutor in unveiling the truth". It also invited Nasrallah "to use his authority to facilitate [the] investigation".

Hezbollah subsequently submitted materials to the Lebanese authorities, who then passed it on to the STL Prosecutor's office. An STL spokesperson confirmed that Prosecutor Daniel Bellemare was "carefully examining" the data.

Calling the potential evidence "important and very sensitive", then-Prime Minister Saad Hariri stated that "I personally am in favor of a deep discussion of the details, because it is very important to me to find out the truth both as prime minister and as [Rafic] Hariri's son". He reportedly said the STL should consider Nasrallah's allegations since his words reflected the views of many in Lebanon.

The indictment's heavy reliance on telecommunications data raised questions upon its release in 2011; many Lebanese officials considered the evidence compromised due to infiltration by a number of intelligence agencies, including Israel's. The telecommunications data remains a fundamental part of the Prosecution's case.

=== Charara Clinic incident ===
On 27 October 2010, a team composed of two STL investigators and their translator, escorted by Lebanese security forces, came to interview Dr. Iman Charara at her clinic, located in the prominently Shi'ite Hezbollah stronghold in Beirut, the Dahieh district. At this time, there were unconfirmed reports that the Tribunal was planning to indict members of Hezbollah. Upon the team's arrival, a crowd of people clad in veils with their faces covered, believed to be mostly men dressed in women's clothes, attacked them and stole several items. The investigators and female translator were extracted by the Lebanese army and subsequently received medical attention.

Following the incident, Charara stated that she had cancelled all appointments for the day, in anticipation of the investigation team's visit, and that she could not ascertain the cause of the clash. She has further stated that the investigators came to obtain the phone numbers of 14-17 of her patients.

The incident prompted reactions from 14 March members, who expressed strong support for the Tribunal, while criticising the incident and accusing Hezbollah of orchestrating it. Hezbollah, in turn, vehemently denied the charges, criticising the Tribunal's violation of the privacy of the Lebanese people. In a televised speech the day after the incident, Nasrallah escalated his previous attacks on the Tribunal as an American-Israeli scheme and stated that cooperation with the Tribunal was tantamount to attacking the Resistance, prompting condemnations from the majority March 14 Alliance as well as the Special Tribunal for Lebanon. The United Nations Secretary-General condemned the attack and called the acts of interference and intimidation unacceptable.

== Verdict ==
On 18 August 2020, the Special Tribunal for Lebanon concluded that there was no evidence that the leadership of Hezbollah or Syria were involved in the assassination of Rafic Hariri. One of the four Hezbollah suspects, Salim Ayyash, was found guilty on the basis of conspiracy to commit a terrorist act, but he is unlikely to serve any prison time since Hezbollah has vowed never to hand over any suspects. However, three other defendants were acquitted due to insufficient evidence.

In addition, the tribunal could not figure out who was the suicide bomber whose body parts were recovered from the scene, nor the people who facilitated the operation; however, they indicated that Hezbollah members were observing the target, based on data from mobile phones allegedly used by the plotters.

On 11 December 2020, the Special Tribunal for Lebanon sentenced Salim Ayyash, to five concurrent terms of life in prison in absentia for his role in the assassination of Rafic Hariri.

On 16 June 2022, Habib Merhi and Hussein Oneissi were also sentenced to life imprisonment in absentia, despite an appeal made earlier in March that year.

== Closure ==
On December 31, 2023, the Special Tribunal for Lebanon (STL) officially ceased operations after 15 years, following a prolonged struggle with financial difficulties. These challenges, rooted in Lebanon's severe economic crisis, had plagued the tribunal since 2021. Despite UN Secretary-General António Guterres' appeals for international contributions to keep the tribunal running, funding shortfalls ultimately led to its closure. Established in 2009 to investigate the assassination of former Lebanese Prime Minister Rafik Hariri and other linked attacks, the STL concluded its mission without fully achieving its goals.

== Archives of the Special Tribunal for Lebanon ==
The archives of the Special Tibunal for Lebanon are stored by the United Nations archives in New York. Digitised versions of the public records of the tribunal are part of the Stanford Virtual Tribunals.

== See also ==
- Rafic Hariri
- Assassination of Rafic Hariri
- List of extrajudicial killings and political violence in Lebanon
- 2005 Lebanon bombings
- United Nations International Independent Investigation Commission
- List of attacks in Lebanon
