= Mehlis report =

The Mehlis Report is the result of the United Nations investigation into the 14 February 2005 assassination of Lebanon's former prime minister Rafik al-Hariri. The investigation was launched in accordance with UN Security Council Resolution 1595 and headed by the German prosecutor, Detlev Mehlis. It involved questioning Lebanese and Syrian officials.

This report was preceded by, and should not be confused with, the UN's FitzGerald Report.

The final draft of the Mehlis Report was released on 20 October 2005, and found that high-ranking members of the Syrian and Lebanese governments were involved in the assassination. The report based its findings on key witnesses and on a variety of evidence including patterns of telephone calls between specific prepaid phone cards that connected prominent Lebanese and Syrian officials to events surrounding the crime.

Upon the release of the first report, the term of the investigation was extended to 15 December 2005; a second report with further findings was released on 10 December 2005.

On 15 December, the Security Council voted unanimously to extend the investigation again to 15 June 2006. On 15 December, Detlev Mehlis stepped down as chief investigator to return to Berlin. On 11 January 2006, Mehlis was replaced by Serge Brammertz.

== Revealed edits ==
The official Mehlis Report made no specific mention of anyone in the Syrian government as responsible for the assassination. However, the report was first erroneously released as a Microsoft Word document which preserved changes that had been made in the document since its creation. According to that document, the original U.N. report had specifically named many high-ranking Syrian government and military officials by name as being personally responsible for the death of Rafik Hariri.

For example, previous editing of the report stated that "Maher al-Assad, Assef Shawkat, Hassan Khalil, Bahjat Suleyman and Jamil Al Sayyed" were behind the killing of Hariri. But in the official version, this is replaced by "senior Lebanese and Syrian officials". Maher al-Assad is the brother of Syrian President Bashar al-Assad, and Assef Shawqat, a powerful figure within the government, was married to their sister Bushra. Suleyman is a top Syrian security official and Al Sayyed, the only Lebanese of the four, was the head of Lebanon's General Security Department at the time of Hariri's assassination.

Some suggest that the document indicates the report was altered to remove these names during a meeting with UN Secretary-General Kofi Annan, despite the fact that he had personally stated that this would not happen. Mehlis himself denied outside influence on the report, and said that Annan did not suggest any changes. The motivation for removing the names is not known.

== Witnesses recanted and killed ==
In December 2005, the UN's case against Syria came under scrutiny when a main witness of the Mehlis Report (Hussam Taher Hussam) was publicly identified and dramatically recanted his testimony, claiming he had been bribed and tortured by Lebanese interests to testify against Syria.

However, the 10 December Mehlis Report asserts receipt of "credible information that, prior to Mr. Hussam's recent public recantation of his statement to the United Nations International Independent Investigation Commission (UNIIC), Syrian officials had arrested and threatened some of Mr. Hussam's close relatives in Syria."

Similar circumstances surround Zuhair Ibn Muhammad Said Saddik, who was later revealed to be the unnamed primary witness in the report. He originally approached the commission with detailed information about the planning of the attack but then later changed his testimony and confessed to participating in the attack. In his testimony, Saddik said that senior Syrian and Lebanese officials had met in his apartment to plan the assassination. He is currently under arrest in Paris at the request of Mehlis for his possible involvement in the Hariri assassination. Subsequent to this, the UN commission which had submitted the Mehlis Report to the UN security council has raised serious doubts about the reliability and the credibility of Saddik's declarations.

Nawar Habib Donna, a Tripoli cell phone dealer, who sold five of the eight prepaid phone cards connected to the killing, was killed in an apparent car accident in November 2005.

== In popular culture ==
Rabee Jaber published an Arabic novel, The Mehlis Report, in the immediate aftermath of the preliminary report in 2005.

== See also ==
- Cedar Revolution
- Ghazi Kanaan
