= United Nations International Independent Investigation Commission =

The United Nations International Independent Investigation Commission (UNIIIC) was established on 7 April 2005 by Security Council Resolution 1595 to investigate the assassination of former Prime Minister of Lebanon, Rafic Hariri, who had been killed in Beirut on 14 February 2005.

On 13 May 2005 Secretary-General Kofi Annan appointed German judge Detlev Mehlis to lead the Commission.

On 19–20 October 2005 the first Mehlis report of the Commission was delivered. Upon release of the first report, the term of the investigation was extended to 15 December 2005.

A second, expanded, report followed on 10 December 2005. Five days later, on 15 December 2005, the Security Council voted unanimously to extend the investigation for another six months to 15 June 2006. That same day Detlev Mehlis stepped down as chief investigator to return to Berlin.

On 11 January 2006 Secretary-General Kofi Annan appointed Belgian Serge Brammertz to replace Mehlis.

On 19 November 2007 Secretary-General Ban Ki-moon appointed Canadian Daniel Bellemare to replace Brammertz on 1 January 2008 after he leaves to replace Carla Del Ponte as chief prosecutor at International Criminal Tribunal for the former Yugoslavia.

On 28 November 2007 Brammertz presented the Commission's ninth report.

On 28 March 2008 the tenth report of the Commission was delivered by Daniel Bellemare.

The UNIIIC mandate ended on 28 February 2009 and it was superseded by the Special Tribunal for Lebanon on 1 March 2009.

In its various reports, UNIIIC determined that members of Lebanese and Syrian security and intelligence agencies committed the assassination through members of Hisbollah.
