= Serge Brammertz =

Belgian prosecutor

Serge, Brammertz
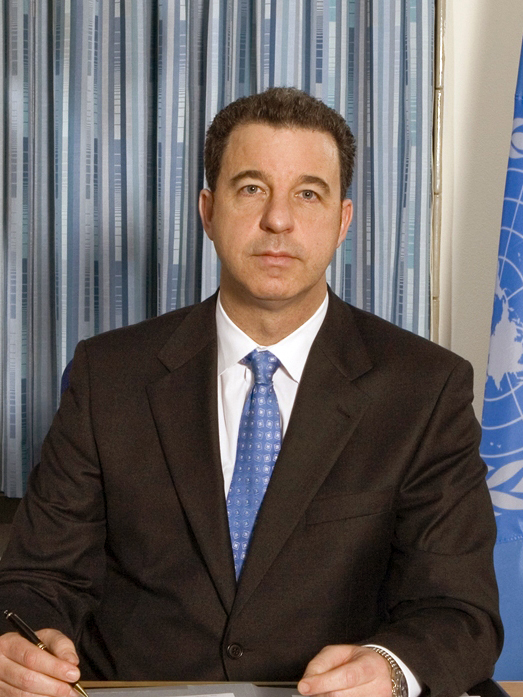

Chief Prosecutor of the International Residual Mechanism for Criminal Tribunals
- Incumbent
- Assumed office 1 March 2016
- Preceded by: Hassan Bubacar Jallow

Chief Prosecutor of the International Criminal Tribunal for the former Yugoslavia (ICTY)
- In office 1 January 2008 – 31 December 2017
- Preceded by: Carla Del Ponte

Deputy Prosecutor of the International Criminal Court
- In office 3 November 2003 – 14 June 2007 Serving with Fatou Bensouda
- Nominated by: Luis Moreno Ocampo
- Preceded by: Position established
- Succeeded by: James Stewart

Personal details
- Born: 17 February 1962 (age 64) Eupen, Belgium
- Education: UCL at Louvain-la-Neuve; University of Liège; Albert Ludwig University of Freiburg
- Profession: Jurist, law professor, international prosecutor

Serge Brammertz (born 17 February 1962) is a Belgian prosecutor, academic and jurist. He serves as the chief prosecutor for the International Residual Mechanism for Criminal Tribunals (IRMCT) since 2016. He also served as the chief prosecutor for the International Criminal Tribunal for the former Yugoslavia (ICTY) from 2008 until its closure in 2017.

He is a native German speaker and is also fluent in Dutch, French and English.

== Biography ==
Serge Brammertz was born in 1962 in Eupen and is a member of the German-speaking Community of Belgium.

On 29 February 2016, Dr Brammertz was appointed by the United Nations Security Council, as the Chief Prosecutor of the IRMCT. On 1 March 2016, he succeeded Hassan Bubacar Jallow as the chief prosecutor for the IRMCT, and was re-appointed for a new term on 26 June 2020. In this role, he manages an international organisation of investigators, analysts and prosecutors, across Arusha, The Hague; and in regional offices in Kigali and Sarajevo. He also implements the IRMCT fugitive tracking strategy. In this, he has had some notable successes.

Brammertz was Deputy Prosecutor of the International Criminal Court from 2003 to 2006, where he was tasked with establishing the Investigations Division of the Office of the Prosecutor, and led investigations on grave violations of international humanitarian law, committed in Uganda, the Democratic Republic of the Congo, and Sudan.

Kofi Annan, then the UN Secretary-General, on 11 January 2006, appointed Brammertz head of the UN International Independent Investigation Commission into the murder of former Lebanese Prime Minister, Rafic Hariri. In this he replaced Detlev Mehlis, who stepped down in January 2006.

On 1 January 2008, Brammertz resigned to succeed Carla Del Ponte as prosecutor for the International Criminal Tribunal for the former Yugoslavia. He served in this role until his subsequent appointment as the Chief Prosecutor of the IRMCT.

Brammertz was first a national magistrate then the head of the Federal Prosecution of the Kingdom of Belgium. In these roles, he supervised numerous investigations and trials related to cases of organised crime, terrorism, international drug trafficking, human trafficking and violations of international humanitarian law. From 1989 to 1997, he served as Deputy Prosecutor, then Chief Deputy Prosecutor at the Court of First Instance in Eupen, Belgium, before becoming Deputy to the Prosecutor-General at the Liège Court of Appeal. In addition, he assisted the Council of Europe as an expert with a mandate to "set up a mechanism for evaluating and applying nationally international undertakings concerning the fight against organized crime". He also served on the Justice and Internal Affairs committee of the European Commission and for the International Organization for Migration.

Brammertz holds a law degree from the Université catholique de Louvain (UCL), a degree in Criminology from the University of Liège, and a PhD in international law from the University of Freiburg (officially the Albert Ludwig University of Freiburg, Germany); his PhD thesis was on the topic "Cross-border Police Cooperation".

Brammertz is a member of the Executive Committee of the International Association of Prosecutors, and previously served as Chairman of the European Judicial Network. He is the Vice President of the International Nuremberg Principles Academy's Advisory Council, and Board Member of the Max Planck Institute for Foreign and International Criminal Law. He has published and lectured widely on the investigation and prosecution of complex crimes, European and international police and judicial cooperation in criminal matters, international humanitarian law, organized crime, terrorism and judicial capacity building. He was a professor of law at the University of Liège until 2002, visiting professor (honorary) at the Faculty of Law at the Chinese University of Hong Kong from 2016 to 2020, and Research Fellow at the Department of Criminal Law and Criminology, at the UCL, from 1991-1993.

== Other activities ==
- Case Matrix Network, member of the advisory board
- International Gender Champions (IGC), member
- International Nuremberg Principles Academy, member of the advisory board
- Max Planck Institute for Foreign and International Criminal Law, member of the board of trustees

== Recognition ==
Dr Brammertz was awarded as the Grand officier de l'ordre de la Couronne, in 2008.

In 2010, he was the recipient of the Prix Condorcet-Aron, awarded by the Centre de Recherche et d’études Politiques (CReP), Brussels.

In October 2013, Brammertz was nominated for the Nobel Peace Prize by the International Institute for Middle-East and Balkan Studies. The nomination was supported by Mothers of Srebrenica and Žepa association, a Srebrenica massacre survivors' campaign group.

By Royal Decree of 2 April 2014, Brammertz was ennobled as a non-hereditary baron by King Philippe of Belgium.

== Selected publications ==
Edited:

- With Jarvis, Michelle, eds. (2016). Prosecuting Conflict-related Sexual Violence at the ICTY. Oxford University Press. ISBN 978-0-19-876856-2.

Authored:

- With Hughes, Kevin C.; Kipp, Alison; Tomljanovich, William B. (December 2016). "Attacks against Cultural Heritage as a Weapon of War: Prosecutions at the ICTY". Journal of International Criminal Justice. 14 (5): 1143–1174. doi:10.1093/jicj/mqw066.
- With Hughes, Kevin C. (2015). "From Primacy to Complementarity: The International Criminal Tribunal for the former Yugoslavia, 1993−2015". In Bergsmo, Morten; CHEAH Wui Ling; SONG Tianying; YI Ping (eds.). Historical origins of international criminal law. Vol. 4. Brussels: Torkel Opsahl Academic EPublisher. pp. 161−233. ISBN 978-82-8348-017-7.
- In: De Baere, Geert; Wouters, Jan, eds. (2015). "International Criminal Justice and the Rule of Law: the experience of the International Criminal Tribunal of the former Yugoslavia". The contribution of international and supranational courts to the rule of law. Cheltenham, UK: Edward Elgar Publishing. pp. 267−303. doi:10.4337/9781783476626. ISBN 978-1-78347-662-6. LCCN 2015943172.
- With Jarvis, Michelle (2010). "12. Lessons Learned in Prosecuting Gender Crimes Under International Law: Experiences from the ICTY". In Eboe-Osuji, Chile (ed.). Protecting humanity: Essays in international law and policy in honour of Navanethem Pillay. Leiden; Boston: Brill Nijhoff. doi:10.1163/ej.9789004183780.i-882.29. ISBN 978-90-04-18957-7.

Belgian nobility
Preceded by Title created	Baron Brammertz; 2014–present	Succeeded by Incumbent
