= FitzGerald Report =

Report into the assassination of Rafik Hariri

The "Report of the Fact-Finding Mission to Lebanon inquiring into the causes, circumstances and consequences of the assassination of former Prime Minister Rafik Hariri, 25 February - 24 March 2005", better known as the FitzGerald Report, is the outcome of an inquiry, ordered by the United Nations Secretary-General Kofi Annan and conducted by Irish deputy police commissioner Peter FitzGerald, into the assassination of former Lebanese Prime Minister Rafik Hariri on 14 February 2005.

== Background ==
In the wake of Hariri's assassination on 14 February 2005, United Nations Secretary General of the United Nations Secretary-General Kofi Annan dispatched a fact-finding mission to investigate the killing. Arriving in Beirut on 25 February, the mission interviewed Lebanese officials and politicians, from both the government and opposition, studied the Lebanese investigation and legal proceedings, examined the crime scene and collected evidence. It also interviewed witnesses. It was authored by Peter FitzGerald, an Irish deputy police commissioner of the Irish Garda Inspectorate.

== Summary ==
The report comments on the political polarization in Lebanon between those who blame pro-Syrian government, and even Syria itself, for the murder, and those who accuse "the enemies of Syria" of carrying out the crime in order to set Syria up. The report emphasizes that it is impossible to identify the culprit until the perpetrators have been brought to justice, but blames the Syrian government, which it charges with exerting "influence that goes beyond the reasonable exercise of cooperative or neighborly relations", with primary responsibility for the political tension that preceded the assassination, by its "(interference) with the details of governance in Lebanon in a heavy-handed and inflexible manner".

It also charges the Lebanese government with "a failure ... to provide adequate protection for its citizens", thereby contributing to "the propagation of a culture of intimidation and impunity", and accuses the Lebanese security forces with "serious and systematic negligence in carrying out the duties usually performed by a professional national security apparatus". The report accuses the Lebanese authorities of not investigating the crime seriously enough, and of failing to pursue the investigation in accordance with acceptable international standards. The acceptability of the results is further compromised, the report says, by the lack of trust of the Lebanese population. In addition, Lebanese investigators are accused of fabricating, falsifying, manipulating, and destroying evidence. Among other things, automobile parts were allegedly planted at the scene of the crime and used as "evidence".

The report goes on to judge as "more than doubtful" the ability of an international commission to carry out a satisfactory investigation while the Lebanese security forces remain under their present leadership, and calls for extensive reforms in the security services, with the assistance of the international community.

== See also ==
- Rafik Hariri
- Lebanon
- Syria
- Cedar Revolution
- Bashar al-Assad
- Émile Lahoud
- Walid Jumblatt
