= Lebanon–Syria relations =

Political relations between Lebanon and Syria

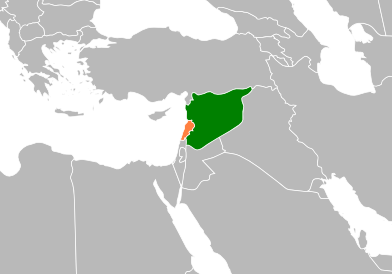
- Syria: Lebanon

Diplomatic mission
- Embassy of Syria, Beirut: Embassy of Lebanon, Damascus

Envoy
- Ambassador Saad Zakhia: Ambassador Abdul Karim Ali

Lebanon–Syria relations were officially established in October 2008 when then-Syrian President Bashar al-Assad issued a decree to establish diplomatic relations with Lebanon for the first time since both countries gained independence from France in 1943 . Lebanon had traditionally been seen by Syria as part of Greater Syria. Following World War I, the League of Nations Mandate partitioned Ottoman Syria under French control, eventually leading to the creation of nation-states Lebanon and Syria.

In the mid-1970s, with the onset of the Lebanese Civil War that involved Muslims, Christians, and Palestinians, Syria took advantage of the situation to extend its influence in the region, initiating the Syrian occupation of Lebanon. Initially called upon by the Christian community in 1976 to prevent potential overrun by Lebanese Muslims and Palestinians, the Syrian military intervened. Subsequently, Syria altered its allegiance, leaning towards support for the Muslims and Palestinians, particularly when the Christian-led Lebanese army aimed to remove Syrian forces from the country.

Relations between the two countries had been strained, especially with the 29-year Syrian occupation, accusations of Syrian intervention within Lebanese politics before and after withdrawal of Syrian troops from Lebanon, and suspicions of Syria assassinating Lebanese political figures like former prime minister Rafic Hariri. Syria officially recognized Lebanon's sovereignty in 2008.

== History ==
=== Greater Syria under Ottoman rule ===
Ottoman Syria, as termed within the Ottoman Empire, was composed of Syria, Lebanon, Palestine and Jordan. In the 1830s, Europeans could trade with Greater Syria through the thriving port city of Beirut. Under the Ottoman Empire, Mount Lebanon (the region of the Lebanon mountain range) enjoyed political autonomy from the center because of its geographic isolation. Whereas Mount Lebanon enjoyed this independence from the Ottoman ruling center, Syrian cities maintained a closer political relationship to Istanbul. However, Ottoman officials still had to rely on local elites for policy implementation. Certain religious minorities within the Ottoman Empire, including the Druze and Maronite Christians, moved into Mount Lebanon because of its isolation. These sects shared political power, and Ibrahim Ali pushed for abolishment of special taxes on Jews and Christians. He also aimed to disarm locals but Druze populations refused; Ibrahim armed Christian troops to fight against these groups. When Ibrahim later tried to disarm these Christian groups, they pushed for the evacuation of Egyptian forces from Greater Syria. However, tensions between the two sects remained especially with Ottoman decrees of 1839 and 1856 ensuring equality for all religious groups. Druze and Sunnis saw Maronites and other Christians as “overstepping the bounds of what was permitted to minority subjects in a Muslim State”.

Since the 1840s, violence between Druze and Maronites extended across Lebanese and Syrian regions. In 1860, Druze populations attacked Christian villages and violence escalated into Damascus “where several thousand Christians were massacred and European consulates were burned”. While Ottoman officials sent military to stabilize Damascus, and Fuad Pasha stated that the instigators of the massacres would be punished, European representatives met in 1861 in Damascus to design a government of Mount Lebanon that would protect Christian minority groups. Europeans agreed on a system (“mutasarrifiyyah”) where a Christian Ottoman subject from outside Lebanon would rule over Mount Lebanon. This led to further isolation of the Mount Lebanon region from Greater Syria and wider Ottoman rule. Peace remained until 1914 when the mutasarrifiyyah was disbanded; during that time of peace though, sectarian tensions remained because the mutasarrifiyyah served as a reminder of the religious divisions. These religious tensions served as a precursor to the greater involvement of European powers within Greater Syria politics that would eventually lead to the division of the area into French Mandates of Syria and Lebanon.

=== Separation into nation-states ===
French Mandate for Syria and the Lebanon. In green is Greater Lebanon.

During World War I, Entente leaders drafted agreements over how Ottoman lands would be divided following the end of the war. The Sykes–Picot Agreement between France and the United Kingdom guaranteed French control over the Syrian coast and indirect control within inner Syria. In 1920, following the end of World War I, the Treaty of Sèvres placed Greater Syria under the control of France as a French territorial mandate. France identified itself as a protector of Christians (in particular Maronites) throughout the region. To protect its power, France aimed to encourage “existing religious, ethnic, and regional differences within Syria”. Political unity would threaten France's military and political establishment within Greater Syria. These divisions included the 1920 creation of Greater Lebanon as a mandate separate from Syria. France ensured that the largest religious group within newly created Lebanon was the Maronite Christians. The remainder of Syria (while titled as a unified Syrian state) was further divided into 5 separate political entities (State of Damascus, State of Aleppo, Alawite State, Jabal al-Druze and Sanjak of Alexandretta) to prevent Syrian nationalist movements. While Maronites hoped to create a Christian state with French-influenced culture, Sunni Muslims within the newly formed mandate wanted to re-bind Lebanon with Syria into Greater Syria.

Following the end of the Great Syrian Revolt, France agreed to hold elections within both countries. Even though the Revolt happened in Syria, it impacted constitutions in both Lebanon and Syria. France refused to change the borders of Lebanon even though several Sunni Muslim leaders still hoped for unification with Syria. Because Sunni Muslims supported nonsectarianism within Lebanese politics, their refusal to participate meant that it was easier for the French to set up a confessional system of politics. The use of confessional politics, which allowed Muslims to participate within the Lebanese government, reduced their desires to merge with Syria. However, Muslims still pushed for Lebanon's identity as an Arab nation whereas Christians identified with the Mediterranean. Voices criticizing the French borders still existed; Antun Sa'adah, founder of the Syrian Social Nationalist Party and a Lebanese Christian, criticized France for dividing Greater Syria. Writers like Sati' al-Husri believed that the only reason why Arab lands remained separate was because of foreign interference. Other writers including Nabih Amin Fares, George Antonius, and Michel ‘Aflaq contended that colonial powers divided Arab land because unity would pose a threat to colonialist rule. Syrian Arab nationalists at first saw the Lebanese government as unconstitutional and unrepresentative because of the confessional system; however, they suspended these viewpoints in hopes of gaining independence through collaborating with Lebanese nationalist movements.

Because France ruled both the Syrian and Lebanese mandates, impacts on France's sovereignty in Europe reverberated within its territories. The 1940 occupation of France led to economic downfall and the suspension of the constitution in both Syria and Lebanon. Because the mandates were vulnerable to invasion, Britain pressured France to allow both countries to hold elections. At the same time, nationalist movements aimed to “create nations” within the geographical boundaries of newly formed states including Syria and Lebanon. In Lebanon, Christians grew to recognize Lebanon's regional Arab identity while Muslims recognized Lebanon’s sovereignty as country separate from Syria. At the same time, movements for pan-Arabism and Islamic solidarity still existed and gained traction within Lebanon, Syria, and the wider Middle East.

=== Independence ===
In 1943, Syria and Lebanon achieved tentative independence from France. In hopes of achieving full independence and the withdrawal of all foreign troops by 1946, nationalist movements made sure to align with each other under a vision of ousting France. This included Syrian nationalists and Lebanese Arab nationalists assuring other Lebanese nationalists that French withdrawal would not lead to subjugation of Lebanon by pan-Arab or pan-Islamist movements. Any differences were pushed towards the future; achieving independence was the primary objective. Syrian and Lebanese governments and elites aimed to pose a “united front against France” (160). Tensions surfaced though when attempting to divide state revenues that historically the French combined in the Common Interests department. Syrian and Lebanese representatives agreed to create the Higher Council of the Common Interests to oversee revenue distributions; the council would have been a joint Syro-Lebanese economic council. While Lebanese leadership emphasized that the agreement respected Lebanese and Syrian independent sovereignty, radical Lebanese nationalists and the Maronite Patriarch Mar Antoine Butrus Arida opposed the council's formation, stating that it would violate the Lebanese constitution since it formed two legislatures. The HCCI was still formed quickly since Lebanese and Syrian leaders were concerned with transferring army and police from France to the two newly independent countries.

The early years after Syrian and Lebanese independence constantly saw Lebanese leadership emphasizing its independence from Syria but reminding nationalists the necessity of working with Syrians in the transfer of power from France to Lebanon and Syria. For example, when Lebanese Minister Camille Chamoun claimed that Lebanon couldn't independently sign a treaty with Syria without the approval of other Arab nations because of the Alexandria Protocol, outraged radical Lebanese nationalists called for an explanation from the Lebanese government. The Lebanese government thus released a statement that emphasized its independence from Arab countries on treaty negotiations. Maronite Archbishop Ignatius Mubarak, in his speech on Mar Maroun Day, thanked the Lebanese government for releasing its statement on the Alexandria Protocol and against Sham’oun's claims. When French forces were bombing Syria, suspicions arose in the Syrian public that the Lebanese secretly approved of the military action and were even choosing to ally with France instead of Syria. The Lebanese foreign minister had to release a statement emphasizing their alliance with the Syrian people, and that the Lebanese government had to restrain citizens from protesting against France in order to maintain greater peace. Lebanon also publicized its aid to Syria including monetary donations, firefighting units, and medical supplies. During this time period, Syria and Lebanon also worked together in gaining international support for foreign troop withdrawal from both countries. The economic alliance between Syria and Lebanon against France ended with the division of the country's finances in 1948.

However, since 1942, Syria indirectly refused to accept the separation since the two countries became independent of each other.

=== Lebanese Civil War and the Syrian occupation of Lebanon ===
According to historians William Cleveland and Martin Bunton, Beirut became an international banking center because of its “laissez-faire economic system”. Business owners from Cairo, Damascus, and Baghdad moved to Beirut for economic opportunities. Despite Lebanon's cultural liberalism and economic prosperity, sectarian tensions remained as citizens identified themselves through their sects. With Muslims calling for greater representation and with Cold War tensions, Lebanese leadership had to decide whether to ally with the West or with Egypt, Syria and its Arab history. Christians wanted to continue alliances with the West but Muslims were drawn to Nasser's pan-Arabism. Multiple factors including sectarian tensions and Palestinian refugee settlement in southern Lebanon contributed to the beginnings of the Lebanese Civil War. In 1976, Syrian President Hafez al-Assad sent troops into Lebanon to fight PLO forces that were gaining sufficient power inside Lebanon to threaten Syria's dominion. This led to escalated fighting until a cease-fire agreement later that year that allowed for the stationing of Syrian and other Arab troops within Lebanon under an Arab League mandate. These troops, known as the Arab Deterrent Force, were tasked with ending the conflict between the Lebanese and the Palestinians. However, since Syrian troops made the majority of the Arab Deterrent Force, Lebanese citizens felt that their country had lost its sovereignty. With Syria in control, all other Arab forces presence withdrew from the Arab Deterrent Force, and Syria's objectives in Lebanon became quickly evident as it quickly changed sides: soon after they entered Lebanon, Syrian troops turned their guns on the Christian nationalists after they had muzzled the PLO. The Kateab Party and the Lebanese Forces under Bachir Gemayel strongly resisted the Syrians in Lebanon. Following the Israeli invasion of Lebanon in 1982 (whose objective was to dislodge Yasser Arafat's PLO from its Lebanese strongholds) and the siege of Beirut that led to Arafat and the PLO evacuation to Tunis, newly elected President Bachir Gemayel was assassinated in a bomb explosion by the Syrian-affiliated member of the Syrian Social Nationalist Party, Habib Shartouni. Bachir's brother Amine Gemayel was quickly sworn in as new president, and the peace plan (the May 1983 accord) Gemayel negotiated with the Israelis under the sponsorship of the United States (militarily present in Lebanon along with Great Britain, France and Italy as the Multi-National Force) was undermined and gutted by the Syrian regime and by Hezbollah that car-bombed the US Marines barracks and the French Paratrooper compound (23 October 1983) among other acts of terrorism. During the Israeli invasion and occupation of Lebanon (1982–1985), Syria suspiciously never fought the Israeli troops; they merely watched the fighting between the Palestinians and the Israelis, consistent indeed with the fact that, from 1974 (when Henry Kissinger brokered a truce between Syria and Israel in the aftermath of the October 1973 war) to date, Syria never fought the Israeli occupation and annexation of its own Syrian Golan Heights, while encouraging the PLO first, then Hezbollah (after the PLO was evicted by Israel in 1982), to prosecute a decades-long war of attrition from Lebanon against Israel. Neither the PLO nor Hezbollah was ever allowed to try and liberate Syrian territory occupied by Israel from Syria itself.

In 1989, 40,000 Syrian troops remained in central and eastern Lebanon under the supervision of the Syrian government. The Taif Accord, established in the same year, enacted a new constitution that redistributed power among the Christians, Sunnis and Shiites, but failed to call for the removal of Syrian troops which remained in the country until 2005. Although the Taef Accord required the dismantling on all militias, Syria's occupation troops allowed Hezbollah to remain armed and active against Israel in South Lebanon. When in 1988, Syria and the United States tried to force the Lebanese Parliament to elect a puppet President, the Parliament failed to elect a new president, and Amine Gemayel appointed Army Chief, General Michel Aoun, as acting Prime Minister who sought the withdrawal of Syrian forces from the country. Aoun led attacks against Syrian troops that resulted in heavy civilian casualties. While a Maronite Christian, Aoun fought the Christian militias who were running smuggling operations from the Lebanese seacoast. The fighting ended on 13 October 1990, when Syrian troops launched an “all-out attack” on Aoun's Lebanese Army forces and bases. For the first time in Lebanon's modern history, the Israeli air force did not intervene as it usually did when Syrian jet fighters bombed the Presidential palace to dislodge Aoun from it. Full withdrawal of Syrian troops though happened in 2005 after the assassination of Prime Minister Rafik Hariri by Hezbollah and huge demonstrations by the Lebanese people against the Syrians; Syrian President Bashar al-Assad had hoped to impose his power over Lebanon, Jordan, and the PLO. However, his involvement in the Lebanese Civil War carried a negative impact on his leadership; Syrian citizens questioned his decisions. According to Naomi Joy Winberger, “After years of intervention and subsequent occupation, Syria suffered reduced stature in each domain [international and regional political standing]”.

=== 1991 Brotherhood Agreement ===
23 May 1991, President Hafez al-Assad of Syria and President Elias Hrawi of Lebanon signed a treaty in Damascus and announced that a new era of cooperation between the two neighboring countries had begun. Officially called the "Treaty of Brotherhood, Cooperation and Coordination", the agreement established a special relationship between them for the first time since they gained independence from France. The deal was said by anti-Syrian Lebanese politicians to be skewed in Syria's favour and implemented by a "Syrian-Lebanese Higher Council Council" that dealt with bilateral issues.

=== 2005 Hariri assassination and aftermath ===
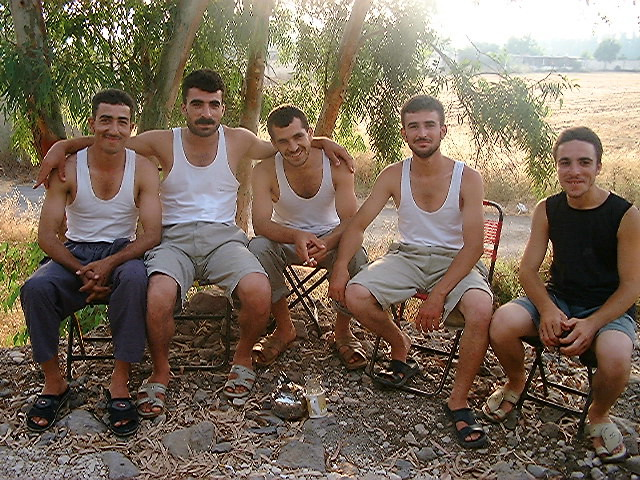
Syrian workers waiting while their trucks were lined up in Akkar, Lebanon, after Syria closed its northern border with Lebanon following its withdrawal, 2005

The 2005 assassination of Rafic Hariri and 21 others led to suspicions that the Syrian government played a role with his death because of Hariri's opposition to Syrian intervention in Lebanese politics. As Prime Minister of Lebanon, Hariri pursued reconstruction of Lebanon following the aftermath of the Lebanese Civil War. In 1998 he resigned but returned in 2000, expanding the tourism industry. His reconstruction efforts gained international praise for rebuilding Beirut and the country. However, he also gained his critics for government corruption and increasing the country's debt. In 2004, his resignation was attributed to his protest of Syrian intervention in Lebanese politics. At any rate, in 2005, his assassination led to mass protests for Syrian withdrawal of troops from Lebanon. The Syrian government denied any involvement of Syrian leaders in Hariri's death but scheduled final withdrawal by 30 April 2005.

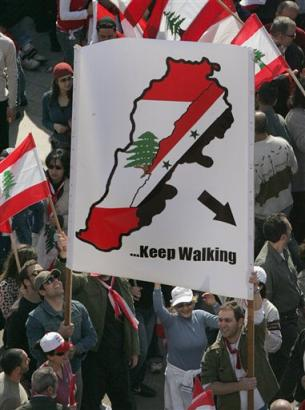
Demonstration against the Syrian occupation in 2005

In 2007, the United Nations Security Council formally established the Special Tribunal for Lebanon to investigate the deaths of Hariri and 21 others. At first, the tribunal incriminated several Syrian security officials. However, investigations later pointed to Hezbollah members. Like the Syrian government, Hezbollah denies any involvement in the deaths of Hariri and others. There are concerns that revealing the truth of who assassinated Hariri might lead to regional instability.

Tensions between Lebanon and Syria were reflected even in pop culture; when Lebanese singer Fairuz sang in Syria's capital Damascus, several Lebanese politicians and citizens criticized her decision. Fairuz responded that Damascus was a cultural center that "will remain a role model of art, culture and authenticity for the coming generations".

=== Establishment of diplomatic relations ===
On 13 August 2008, at a meeting in Paris during the first Summit of the Union for the Mediterranean, Syrian President Bashar al-Assad and Lebanese President Michel Sleiman agreed to establish diplomatic relations between their countries at ambassadorial level. In December 2008, the Syrian Embassy was opened in Beirut. In March 2009, Lebanon opened its embassy in Damascus. On 19 December 2009, Lebanese Prime Minister Saad Al-Hariri visited Syria, and stayed in Damascus for 3 days of meetings with President Bashar al-Assad.

== Effect of the Syrian Civil War (2011–2024) ==
During protests in Syria against the al-Assad government, clashes spilled into Tripoli, Lebanon in February 2012. Pro-Assad forces fought against opposition to the Assad presidency in the Bab al-Tabbaneh, Jabal Mohsen conflict, leading to the deaths of three people and more injuries. Tripoli has a majority Sunni Muslim population but also secular pro-Assad Alawites. One Sunni cleric alleged that the Syrian president sent forces into Tripoli to introduce unrest within the region. March 2012 discussions on the national level included concerns that toppling the al-Assad government would result in regional instability for Lebanon and Iraq.

The influx of Syrian refugees has increased local tensions between sects in Lebanon. In November 2011, the Syrian army had installed landmines along the border to prevent people from fleeing into Lebanon. Syria demanded Lebanon to search for Free Syria Army members hiding along the border. As of 2021, it is estimated that the number of Syrian refugees in Lebanon is over 1.5 million.

However, smuggling increased during the Syrian Civil War between the two sides of the borders, especially at the illegal border crossings, including arms, fuels, flour, subsidized goods, and foreign currencies.

On 17 July 2021, President Bashar al-Assad mentioned that $40 to $60 billion of Syrian funds were frozen in Lebanese banks during the 2019–2021 Lebanese protests.

=== Post-Assad relations ===
Following the fall of the Assad regime and establishment of a new Syrian transitional government, Syrian refugees reached the Masnaa Border Crossing, as all other Lebanon's border crossings were closed by the Lebanese forces. On 28 December 2024, Lebanon expelled about 70 Syrian officers and soldiers, after they entered illegally, and were sent back through the Arida crossing. Former Lebanese Prime Minister Najib Mikati made an official visit to Damascus on 11 January 2025, meeting with Syria's de facto leader Ahmed al-Sharaa. This was the first visit by a Lebanese prime minister to Syria since 2010.

The fall of Assad’s regime in Syria was said to start a new chapter in Lebanon without the interference of the Syrian Baathist regime. On 9 January 2025, Lebanon elected a president for the first time without the Syrian Baathist regime in power since 1958, meaning the first time in decades that a president did not need to be approved by Syria. Lebanese security institutions became able to function without direct or indirect interference by Syria’s now defunct regime. Later that year, on 10 October 2025, Syria's Foreign Minister Asaad al-Shaibani paid an official visit to Beirut, where he met with President Joseph Aoun and Foreign Minister Youssef Rajji. Discussions centered on border management, the return of refugees, missing persons, and the situation of detained Syrians in Lebanon.

=== 2025 Border Clashes ===
In early 2025, tensions escalated along the Lebanese-Syrian border, particularly in the Baalbek-Hermel region, due to clashes between Syrian security forces and Lebanese armed factions. The Syrian army initiated operations to shut down smuggling routes, leading to confrontations with local clans affiliated with Hezbollah. These clashes resulted in casualties on both sides and prompted the Lebanese army to bolster its border presence

Key Events:

- February 6, 2025: The Syrian army launched a campaign in western Homs province to close smuggling routes, which included entering the Lebanese border town of Haweek. The operation saw exchanges of gunfire, mortar use, and the capture of two Syrian soldiers by Lebanese clans. Syria responded with reinforcements, attacks on Haweek, and arrests of Hezbollah-linked individuals. A Syrian projectile also injured a Lebanese soldier in the town of al-Qasr.
- February 8-9, 2025: In response to the clashes, Lebanese President Joseph Aoun ordered retaliation to Syrian fire. The Lebanese army moved to new positions, and shelling targeted towns in the Hermel region. The Lebanese army retaliated by attacking Syrian positions, downing two Syrian drones, and targeting Hezbollah strongholds in northern Lebanon.
- February 10, 2025: The Lebanese army seized significant quantities of weapons and ammunition from Hezbollah-affiliated individuals. Syrian authorities reported dismantling drug manufacturing facilities in Haweek. Some Lebanese Shiite clans, to avoid further conflict, withdrew from Syria to Lebanon.
- March 2025: Lebanon saw an influx of Alawite Syrian refugees fleeing sectarian violence in Syria's coastal region. Over 350 families crossed into northern Lebanon, wading through the Nahr El Kabir River to escape attacks targeting their community. Witnesses described bearded foreign militants killing civilians, including women and children. The violence erupted after Syria’s Sunni-led government clashed with remnants of Bashar al-Assad’s regime. More than 1,200 people, mostly Alawites, were killed, according to the Syrian Observatory for Human Rights. Lebanon, which previously hosted over a million Syrian refugees, saw local Alawite communities aiding the new arrivals.

In April 2026, Ibrahim Olabi, Syria's permanent representative to the UN, alleged that Israel was using Syrian territory as a base for attacks against Lebanon. According to Olabi, this practice risked escalating into a wider regional conflict.

== See also ==
- Syrians in Lebanon
- Lebanese people in Syria
- Lebanon–Syria border
- Levant Quartet
- List of extrajudicial killings and political violence in Lebanon
- Iranian smuggling to Lebanon
- 2025 Syrian refugee return plan (Lebanon)
