= Hotovlje =

Hotovlje may refer to the following places:

In Bosnia and Herzegovina:

- Hotovlje, Kalinovik, a village in the Municipality of Kalinovik

In Slovenia:

- Hotovlja, a settlement in the Municipality of Gorenja Vas–Poljane (known as Hotovlje until 1993)
