= Germans of Yugoslavia =

Ethnic group

The Germans of Yugoslavia (German: Jugoslawiendeutsche, Serbo-Croatian: jugoslovenski Nemci/југословенски Немци, jugoslavenski Nijemci/југославенски Нијемци) is a term for German-speakers who form a minority group in former Yugoslavia, namely Croatia, Serbia, Bosnia and Herzegovina or Slovenia. Despite the name for the group, the label includes ethnic Germans, primarily Danube Swabians, and Austrians. The largest German minority was found in Serbia prior to dissolution of Yugoslavia.

== History ==
Due to incursions of the Huns in Europe and the associated migration period in the 4th century, Germanic people migrated to the Danube and the Mediterranean as early as the year 375. The first Germans settled in areas of former Yugoslavia approximately 800 years ago. The majority of Germans in the area lived in the Danube basin between Hungary, Croatia and Serbia, and were known as Danube Swabians. The Danube Swabians developed their own distinct culture and dialect. There were most likely also German settlers on the Adriatic who were absorbed into the local population. Much of the history of the German community in former Yugoslavia, during and just after the Second World War, can best be described as a set of mutual massacres between Germans and Yugoslavs. During the war, the Nazi German government raised the 7th Waffen SS Volunteer Mountain Division, Prinz Eugen, from ethnic Germans living in the Serbian and Croatian regions of former Yugoslavia. Initially, the Germans were induced to volunteer, but as the war turned against Germany, they were conscripted, as occurred in other Eastern European German communities. This was one of the foremost German formations to fight Tito’s Communist Partisans. This unit had one of the worst records of human rights violations of any German formation, massacring civilians, particularly in the Bosnian and Dalmatian campaigns. For example, on September 16, 1941, the German Army High Command (OKW) issued an order that one hundred civilian hostages be executed for every German soldier killed, and fifty hostages executed for every German soldier wounded.

At the end of the war, in retribution, Partisan bands engaged in massacres of ethnic Germans, primarily in the Province of Vojvodina in present-day Serbia. Villages were wiped out, with the inhabitants either killed or forced into concentration camps, where many died of hunger or disease. As justification for their actions to eliminate the German minority in Yugoslavia, the Partisans applied the principle of collective guilt to the German ethnic group for the atrocities of the Nazi regime.

The provisional government of Tito’s Partisan movement was the AVNOJ (Anti-Fascist Council for the Liberation of Yugoslavia). In its meeting in Belgrade on November 21, 1944, it decreed that all property of ethnic Germans residing in Yugoslavia be confiscated. Their Yugoslav citizenship was revoked, they no longer had any civil rights, and they were declared enemies of the people. Exempted were those ethnic Germans who participated in the partisan national liberation movement, and those who were not members of German ethnic societies such as the “Schwäbisch–Deutsche Kulturbund", nor declared themselves to be members of the ethnic German community.

Of the approximately 524,000 Germans living in pre-war Yugoslavia, about 370,000 escaped to Austria and Germany in the last days of the War or were subsequently expelled by the Yugoslav Government. (At one point, in January 1946, the Yugoslav Government requested the U.S. military authorities’ permission to transfer these ethnic Germans to the U.S. occupation zone of Germany, but it was not granted). Of this number, 30,000 to 40,000 escaped from Yugoslav concentration and work camps, often with the connivance of the authorities, most going either to Hungary or Romania. Those who went to Hungary subsequently fled or were expelled to Austria or Germany, whereas those who fled to Romania generally remained, at least provisionally, in the Swabian communities in the Romanian Banat. About 55,000 people were murdered in the concentration camps, another 31,000 died serving in the German armed forces, and about 31,000 disappeared, mostly likely dead, with another 37,000 still unaccounted for. Thus the total victims of the war and subsequent ethnic cleansing and killings comprised about 30% of the pre-war German population.

=== Current situation ===
There are currently approx 8,300 people in former Yugoslavia who acknowledge some German heritage. Many residents actively practice their German cultural heritage, and some still speak the local form of the German dialect, Shwovish. This dialect is a mixture of old German from the eighteenth century with many Hungarian and Serbo-Croatian words, similar to what was spoken in Yugoslavia before the Second World War.

== Geography ==
=== Croatia ===
In Croatia around 2,800 people identify themselves as part of the German and Austrian Minority, the majority of whom are Danube Swabians. The “German and Austrian Minority,” as they are officially called, holds a permanent seat in the Croatian Parliament (Sabor).

=== Serbia ===
The largest German minority in the former Yugoslavia is found in Serbia. The majority of the remaining population of German origin lives in the northern Serbia in Vojvodina, an area that also has a sizeable Hungarian minority. The Hungarian and Serbian populations also refer to them as Swabian as well. They are known as the Danube Swabians or Banat Swabians.

The Serbian census from 2002 records 3,901 Germans in Serbia, of which 3,154 in the province of Vojvodina. In December 2007 they formed their own minority council in Novi Sad, which they were entitled to with 3,000 voter signatures. The president, Andreas Biegermeier, stated that the council will focus on property restitution, and marking of mass graves and camp sites. He estimated the total number of remaining Danube Swabians in Serbia and their descents at 5,000–8,000.

=== Bosnia and Herzegovina ===
The first Germans here were Saxon miners from Transylvania and northern Hungary (modern Slovakia) in the late 13th century. They assimilated into the local Roman Catholic population.

More recent German immigration started here following the Habsburg occupation of 1878. Some agricultural colonists came from Germany proper but most were Danube Swabians from nearby Bačka. The first settlers came from Silesia and the Rhineland, and created a settlement called Windthorst near the Croatian frontier. After the 1888 visit by Rudolf, Crown Prince of Austria an offshoot colony was established and named Rudolfstal. Protestant Danube Swabians set up Franzjosefsfeld in 1886. "The government looked favourably on these farmers and gave them tax concessions; and in 1890 is passed a special law on 'agrarian colonies', offering up to twelve hectares per family, rent-free for the first three years and then on a low mortgage which would end after ten years if they took Bosnian citizenship. Altogether fifty-four such colonies were established, with a population of nearly 10,000."

Following the collapse of internal security during World War II the Nazis decided to evacuate the Volksdeutsche population from Bosnia and a treaty to this effect was signed on 30 September 1942. The Hauptamt Volksdeutsche Mittelstelle (VoMi) organised an SS commando from Belgrade under Otto Lackman and "...went from village to village, accompanied by the military. They found the communities already victims of partisan raids and even came under attack themselves. By the end of November, VoMi's commandos had evacuated some 18,000 Volksdeutsche from Bosnia."

Areas formerly settled by Germans include:

- Dubrava (Königsfeld)
- Nova Topola (Windthorst)
- Bosanski Aleksandrovac (Rudolfstal)
- Franzjosefsfeld
- Prosara (Hohenberg / Hindenburg)
- Zenica (Senitza)
- Zepce (Scheptsche)

=== Slovenia ===
There are two German-speaking minorities in Slovenia. One consists of around 1,600 people, centred on Maribor (German: Marburg). The other is smaller in size and are the Gottscheer Germans, who live in the Kočevje (German: Gottschee) region. They are both Austrian in origin, and are unrelated to the other German minorities in Yugoslavia.

== Notable people ==
- Đorđe Vajfert or Georg Weifert (1850–1937), Serbian industrialist, Governor of the National Bank of Serbia and later Yugoslavia
- Heinrich Knirr (1862–1944), German painter
- Dragutin Kamber (1901–1969), Croatian Jesuit priest
- Branko Elsner (1929-2012), Slovenian former soccer player and soccer coach
- Robert Zollitsch (born 1938), German prelate
- Werner Roth (born 1948), German–American soccer player
- Boštjan Nachbar (born 1980), Slovenian former basketball player
- Kevin Kampl (born 1990), Slovenian-German soccer player
- Blaž Kramer (born 1996), Slovenian soccer player

== See also ==
- Germans of Croatia
- Germans of Serbia
- Ernst Thälmann Company
- Banat Swabians
- Danube Swabians
- Germans of Hungary
- Germans of Romania
- Germany–Yugoslavia relations
- Shwova
