= Luko =

Luko may refer to:

== People ==
- Luko Biskup (born 1981), Croatian football player
- Luko Stulić (1772–1828), Ragusan scientist
- Luko Zore (1846–1906), Serbian philologist

== Places ==
- Luko, Kalinovik, Bosnia and Herzegovina
