= Kalinovik =

Kalinovik Калиновик
- Town and municipality
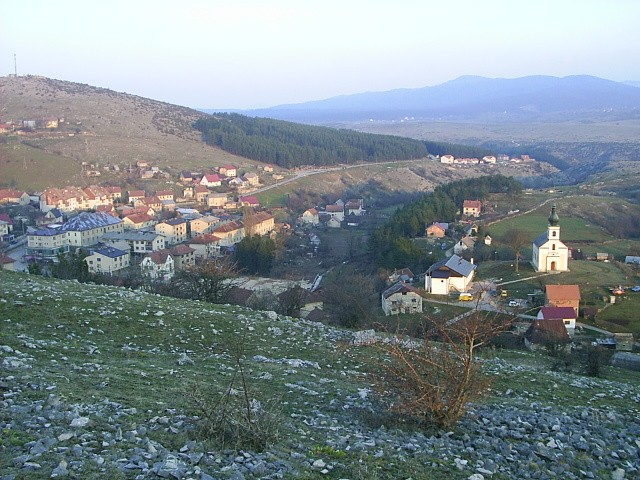
- View on Kalinovik

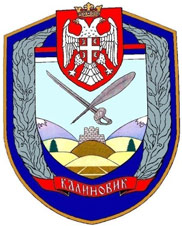
- Coat of arms

- Location of Kalinovik within Bosnia and Herzegovina

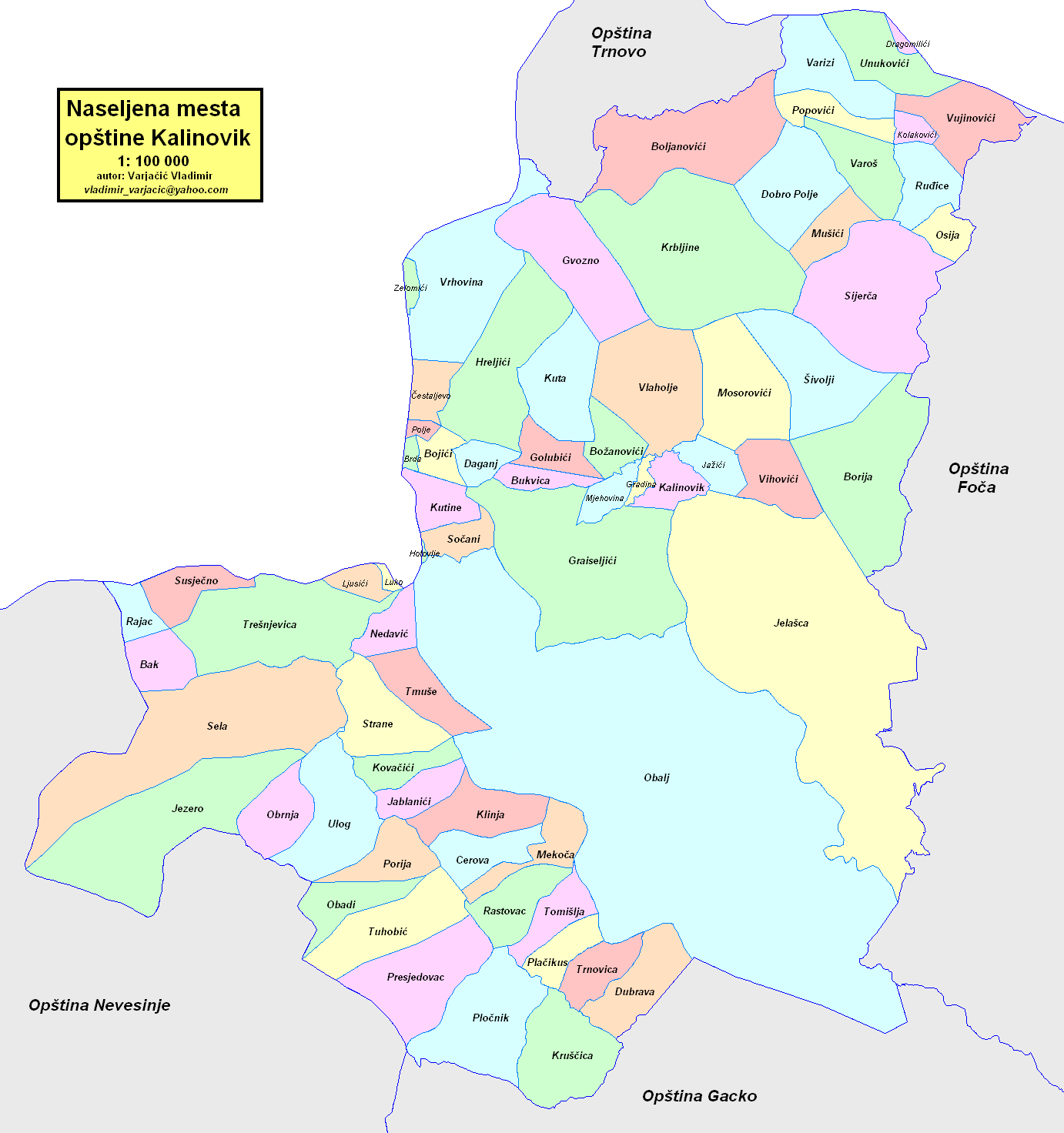
- Coordinates: 43°30′15″N 18°26′48″E
- Country: Bosnia and Herzegovina
- Entity: Republika Srpska

Government
  - Municipal mayor: Radomir Sladoje (SNSD)
  - Municipality: 681.15 km^{2} (262.99 sq mi)

Population (2013 census)
  - Town: 1,093
  - Municipality: 2,029
  - Municipality density: 2.979/km^{2} (7.715/sq mi)
- Time zone: UTC+1 (CET)
  - Summer (DST): UTC+2 (CEST)
- Area code: 57
- Website: kalinovik.info

Kalinovik (Serbian Cyrillic: Калиновик) is a town and municipality in Republika Srpska, Bosnia and Herzegovina. As of 2013, the town has a population of 1,093 inhabitants, while the municipality has 2,029 inhabitants.

The municipality adjoins the municipality of Konjic, with which the boundary also forms part of the Inter-Entity Boundary Line (IEBL) between the two constituent entities of Bosnia and Herzegovina.

== Geography ==
Kalinovik is located about 70 kilometres south of Sarajevo, in the middle of one of the Karstic landscapes characteristic of the region. The calcareous plateaus, eaten into by water, are strewn with valleys or fields, types of sinkhole-like lunar craters.

The municipality adjoins the municipality of Konjic. The towns of Konjic and Kalinovik are connected by an asphalt road. Communications were disrupted when the bridge over the Ljuta river at Dindo was destroyed in autumn 1995, in the last months of the war, but were restored after a replacement bridge was constructed in 2002.

The boundary between the municipalities of Konjic and Kalinovik also forms part of the Inter-Entity Boundary Line (IEBL) between the two constituent entities of Bosnia and Herzegovina.

=== Climate ===
Climate in this area has mild differences between highs and lows, and there is adequate rainfall year-round. The Köppen Climate Classification subtype for this climate is "Cfb" (Marine West Coast Climate/Oceanic climate).

Climate data for Kalinovik
| Month | Jan | Feb | Mar | Apr | May | Jun | Jul | Aug | Sep | Oct | Nov | Dec | Year |
|---|---|---|---|---|---|---|---|---|---|---|---|---|---|
| Mean daily maximum °C (°F) | −4 (24) | −5 (23) | −2 (28) | 0 (32) | 6 (42) | 9 (48) | 12 (53) | 12 (53) | 9 (48) | 5 (41) | −1 (31) | −3 (26) | 3 (37) |
| Mean daily minimum °C (°F) | −13 (8) | −8 (18) | −6 (22) | −3 (27) | 2 (36) | 5 (41) | 8 (46) | 8 (46) | 6 (42) | 1 (34) | −3 (26) | −7 (20) | −1 (31) |
| Average precipitation days | 15 | 15 | 15 | 16 | 14 | 12 | 10 | 11 | 9 | 12 | 13 | 14 | 156 |
Source: Weatherbase

== History ==
=== Bosnian War ===
Between April 1992 and April 1993 during the first year of the Bosnian War the municipality of Kalinovik Bosniak population left Kalinovik, moving into Bosnian forces controlling areas. Grave crimes were committed against Bosniak Muslim civilians in Kalinovik by the Bosnian Serbs Ratko Bundalo and Nedjo Zeljaja.

Bundalo was commander of the Tactical Group in Kalinovik and Zeljaja was commander of the Public Safety Station. Under their authority civilians were detained in the "Miladin Radojevic" school building in 1992. Members of paramilitary units who "mistreated all residents, irrespective of ethnicity" took part in the rape of women and other physical abuse of detainees in the school. Men prisoners were taken out and beaten, and some never returned. Aleksandar Cerovina and Slavko Lalović were mentioned by witnesses as accomplices in the crimes and Cerovina as having been involved in intimidation of witnesses.

On 21 December 2009 the Court of Bosnia and Herzegovina found Bundalo and Zeljaja guilty of persecution, murder, detention and torture of Muslims from April 1992 to March 1993. Bundalo was sentenced to 19 years in prison, Zeljaja to 15 years. A third defendant. Djordjislav Askraba, director of the Barutni Magacin detention camp, was acquitted due to lack of evidence.

In autumn 1995 the Bosnian Army destroyed the bridge over the Ljuta river at Dindo to prevent Bosnian Serb tanks attacking Konjic and the Neretva valley. The road link between the towns of Konjic and Kalinovik was restored in 2002 when a Bailey Bridge across the river was constructed by a Spanish army engineering section of SFOR in a UNHCR-led initiative.

=== Post-war social developments ===
There is unemployment and rural deprivation in Kalinovik. The Upper Drina valley, devastated by the war and bisected by the inter-entity boundary, remains troubled by deep-seated divisions and difficult community relations. Political obstruction by hard-line politicians has isolated the area from international development assistance and the economic mainstream. Core economic problems are exacerbated by geographical remoteness and the mountainous region is peripheral to regional and national markets. Many local communities are among the most deprived in Bosnia.

The war crimes indictee and fugitive Ratko Mladić remains an influential presence locally. Friends and family still express support for him and regard him as a hero though local people are reluctant to talk to outsiders. Serbian officials have said that comrades from Kalinovik are among Mladić's support network.

Once a prosperous Austro-Hungarian military stronghold, Kalinovik is now an impoverished rural municipality with a population of only 2,500. During the Bosnian war the area was ethnically cleansed of its Bosniak (Muslim) population by the Bosnian Serb authorities. Many of its Serb inhabitants have since left in search of better lives elsewhere.

Newcomers from Sarajevo have settled in the town. The traditional domestic role of women in Kalinovik has changed since Verica Elez, a professor of Serbian language and literature and an newcomer, began to encourage local women to take advantage of the post-war development opportunities offered by international organizations concerned with women’s issues and with strengthening the role of women in rural communities. The women's group she is president of collaborates with NGOs to obtain computers, develop marketing opportunities and encourage women to take on management roles. The NGO IFAD has supported development in Kalinovik through rural infrastructure reconstruction, credit for livestock, and training and seminars. Some women are involved in wool processing (weaving and scarf and blanket making) and are planning a weaving workshop, others work in milk collection and processing.

== Settlements ==
Aside from the town of Kalinovik, the municipality includes the following settlements:

- Bak
- Bojići
- Boljanovići
- Borija
- Božanovići
- Brda
- Bukvica
- Cerova
- Čestaljevo
- Daganj
- Dobro Polje
- Dragomilići
- Dubrava
- Gapići
- Golubići
- Gradina
- Graiseljići
- Gvozno
- Hotovlje
- Hreljići
- Jablanići
- Jažići
- Jelašca
- Jezero
- Klinja
- Kolakovići
- Kovačići
- Krbljine
- Kruščica
- Kuta
- Kutine
- Luko
- Ljusići
- Ljuta
- Mekoča
- Mjehovina
- Mosorovići
- Mušići
- Nedavić
- Obadi
- Obalj
- Obrnja
- Osija
- Plačikus
- Pločnik
- Polje
- Popovići
- Porija
- Presjedovac
- Rajac
- Rastovac
- Ruđice
- Sela
- Sijerča
- Sočani
- Strane
- Susječno
- Šivolji
- Tmuše
- Tomišlja
- Trešnjevica
- Trnovica
- Tuhobić
- Ulog
- Unukovići
- Varizi
- Varoš
- Vihovići
- Vlaholje
- Vrhovina
- Vujinovići
- Zelomići

== Demographics ==
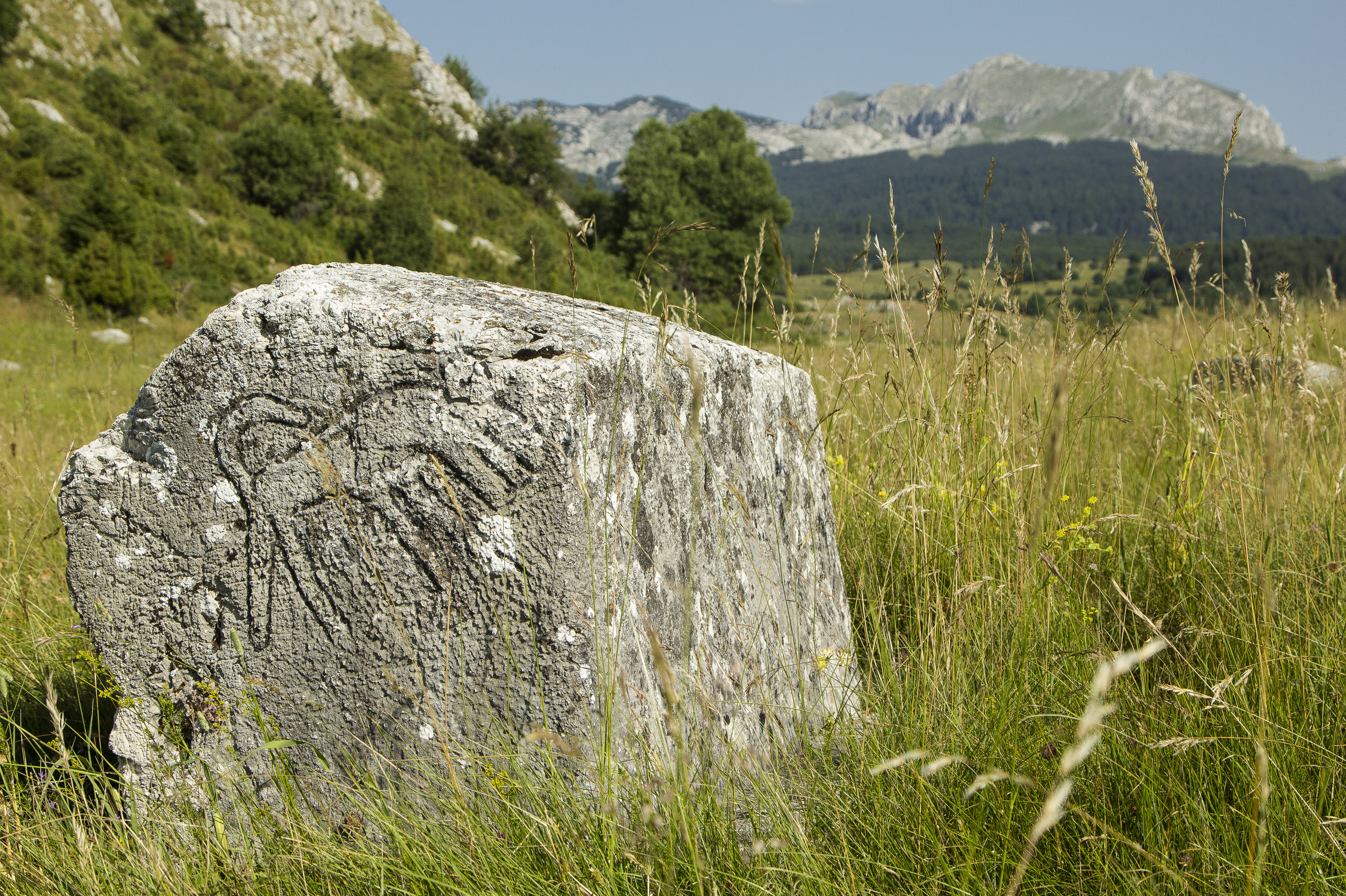
Stećak

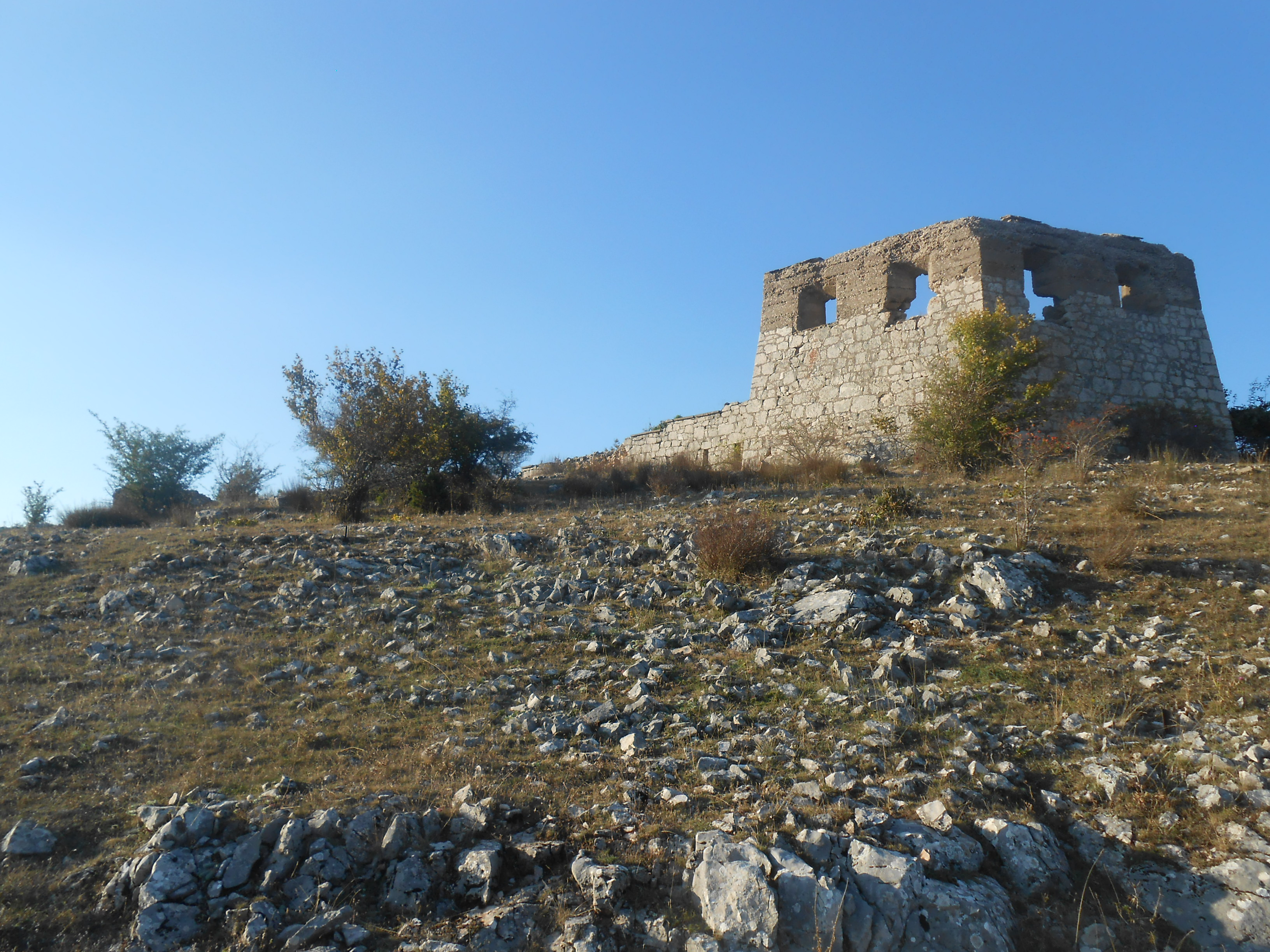
Medieval fortress Gradina

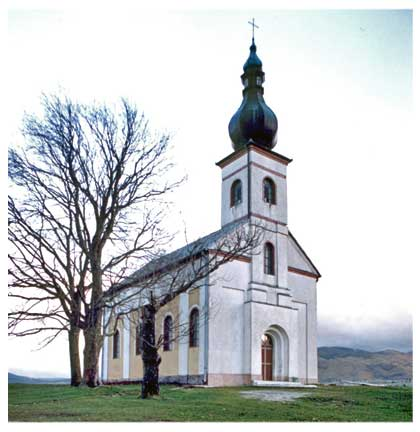
Serbian Orthodox Church of Saint Peter and Paul founded in the 19th century

=== Population ===
Population of settlements – Kalinovik municipality
| | Settlement | 1953. | 1961. | 1971. | 1981. | 1991. | 2013. |
| | Total | 13,774 | 7,319 | 9,458 | 6,597 | 4,249 | 2,029 |
| 1 | Kalinovik | | | 795 | 1,196 | 1,385 | 1,093 |

=== Ethnic composition ===
Ethnic composition – Kalinovik town
| | 2013. | 1991. | 1981. | 1971. |
| Total | 1,093 (100,0%) | 1,385 (100,0%) | 1,196 (100,0%) | 795 (100,0%) |
| Serbs | | 1,061 (76,61%) | 902 (75,42%) | 670 (84,28%) |
| Bosniaks | | 244 (17,62%) | 200 (16,72%) | 89 (11,19%) |
| Others | | 46 (3,321%) | 7 (0,585%) | 8 (1,006%) |
| Yugoslavs | | 30 (2,166%) | 50 (4,181%) | 12 (1,509%) |
| Croats | | 4 (0,289%) | 9 (0,753%) | 6 (0,755%) |
| Montenegrins | | | 28 (2,341%) | 10 (1,258%) |

Ethnic composition – Kalinovik municipality
| | 2013. | 1991. | 1981. | 1971. |
| Total | 2,029 (100,0%) | 4,667 (100,0%) | 6,597 (100,0%) | 9,458 (100,0%) |
| Serbs | 1,947 (95,96%) | 2,826 (60,55%) | 3,691 (55,95%) | 5,536 (58,53%) |
| Bosniaks | 57 (2,809%) | 1,716 (36,77%) | 2,681 (40,64%) | 3,796 (40,14%) |
| Others | 17 (0,838%) | 62 (1,328%) | 13 (0,197%) | 21 (0,222%) |
| Croats | 8 (0,394%) | 17 (0,364%) | 29 (0,440%) | 44 (0,465%) |
| Yugoslavs | | 46 (0,986%) | 148 (2,243%) | 20 (0,211%) |
| Montenegrins | | | 35 (0,531%) | 41 (0,433%) |

== Economy ==
The following table gives a preview of total number of registered people employed in legal entities per their core activity (as of 2018):

| Activity | Total |
|---|---|
| Agriculture, forestry and fishing | 147 |
| Mining and quarrying | - |
| Manufacturing | 20 |
| Electricity, gas, steam and air conditioning supply | 19 |
| Water supply; sewerage, waste management and remediation activities | 15 |
| Construction | - |
| Wholesale and retail trade, repair of motor vehicles and motorcycles | 16 |
| Transportation and storage | 9 |
| Accommodation and food services | 15 |
| Information and communication | - |
| Financial and insurance activities | 1 |
| Real estate activities | - |
| Professional, scientific and technical activities | 4 |
| Administrative and support service activities | 2 |
| Public administration and defense; compulsory social security | 57 |
| Education | 59 |
| Human health and social work activities | 35 |
| Arts, entertainment and recreation | 7 |
| Other service activities | 12 |
| Total | 418 |

== Notable people ==
- Bosnian Serb Army General Ratko Mladić, indicted on war crimes charges by the International Criminal Tribunal for the former Yugoslavia, was born in the village of Božanovići, in the municipality of Kalinovik.
- Momčilo Mandić, Republika Srpska Justice minister, was born in Kalinovik.

== See also ==
- Municipalities of Republika Srpska
