= Trešnjevica =

Trešnjevica may refer to the following places:

== Bosnia and Herzegovina ==
- Trešnjevica (Kalinovik)
- Trešnjevica (Konjic)

== Serbia ==
- Trešnjevica (Arilje)
- Trešnjevica (Paraćin)
- Trešnjevica (Sjenica)
