= Tuhobić =

Tuhobić may refer to:

- Tuhobić, Bosnia and Herzegovina, a hamlet near Kalinovik, Bosnia
- Tuhobić (mountain), a mountain in Gorski Kotar, Croatia
