= Plačikus =

Plačikus Плачикус
- Village
- Location within Bosnia and Herzegovina
- Coordinates: 43°20′59″N 18°24′01″E
- Country: Bosnia and Herzegovina
- Entity: Republika Srpska
- Municipality: Kalinovik
- Time zone: UTC+1 (CET)
  - Summer (DST): UTC+2 (CEST)

Plačikus (Serbian Cyrillic: Плачикус) is a village in the municipality of Kalinovik, Republika Srpska, Bosnia and Herzegovina.
