= Sijerča =

Sijerča Сијерча
- Village
- Location within Bosnia and Herzegovina
- Coordinates: 43°34′N 18°33′E
- Country: Bosnia and Herzegovina
- Entity: Republika Srpska
- Municipality: Kalinovik
- Time zone: UTC+1 (CET)
  - Summer (DST): UTC+2 (CEST)

Sijerča (Serbian Cyrillic: Сијерча) is a village in the municipality of Kalinovik, Republika Srpska, Bosnia and Herzegovina.

== Geography ==
Sijerča is a village located about 52 kilometers south of Sarajevo and 18 kilometers east of Kalinovik, the Kalinovik municipality's capital. It is situated on a karst plateau, overlooking the Bistrica river canyon, Sjeračke Stijene, named after the village.

== Demographics ==
In 1961, the census recorded 175 inhabitants. In the 1960s and 1970s, due to urbanization, the population of the village diminished and Sijerča practically has no year-round inhabitants today.

For at least a century, four families lived in Sijerča: Elez, Purković, Tepavčević and Vučetić.
