= Zelomići =

Zelomići Зеломићи
- Village
- Location within Bosnia and Herzegovina
- Coordinates: 43°32′53″N 18°19′31″E
- Country: Bosnia and Herzegovina
- Entity: Republika Srpska
- Municipality: Kalinovik
- Time zone: UTC+1 (CET)
  - Summer (DST): UTC+2 (CEST)

Zelomići (Serbian Cyrillic: Зеломићи) is a village in the municipality of Kalinovik, Republika Srpska, Bosnia and Herzegovina.
