= Vrhovina, Kalinovik =

Vrhovina Врховина
- Village
- Location within Bosnia and Herzegovina
- Coordinates: 43°32′36″N 18°21′25″E
- Country: Bosnia and Herzegovina
- Entity: Republika Srpska
- Municipality: Kalinovik
- Time zone: UTC+1 (CET)
  - Summer (DST): UTC+2 (CEST)

Vrhovina (Serbian Cyrillic: Врховина) is a village in the municipality of Kalinovik, Republika Srpska, Bosnia and Herzegovina.
