= Jezero, Kalinovik =

Jezero Језеро
- Village
- Location within Bosnia and Herzegovina
- Coordinates: 43°24′17″N 18°15′26″E
- Country: Bosnia and Herzegovina
- Entity: Republika Srpska
- Municipality: Kalinovik
- Time zone: UTC+1 (CET)
  - Summer (DST): UTC+2 (CEST)

Jezero (Serbian Cyrillic: Језеро) is a village in the municipality of Kalinovik, Republika Srpska, Bosnia and Herzegovina.
