= Mekoča =

Mekoča Мекоча
- Village
- Location within Bosnia and Herzegovina
- Coordinates: 43°23′N 18°22′E
- Country: Bosnia and Herzegovina
- Entity: Republika Srpska
- Municipality: Kalinovik
- Time zone: UTC+1 (CET)
  - Summer (DST): UTC+2 (CEST)

Mekoča (Serbian Cyrillic: Мекоча) is a village in the municipality of Kalinovik, Republika Srpska, Bosnia and Herzegovina.
