= Ljusići =

Ljusići Љусићи
- Village
- Location within Bosnia and Herzegovina
- Coordinates: 43°28′N 18°19′E
- Country: Bosnia and Herzegovina
- Entity: Republika Srpska
- Municipality: Kalinovik
- Time zone: UTC+1 (CET)
  - Summer (DST): UTC+2 (CEST)

Ljusići (Serbian Cyrillic: Љусићи) is a village in the municipality of Kalinovik, Republika Srpska, Bosnia and Herzegovina.
