= Sela, Kalinovik =

Sela Села
- Village
- Location within Bosnia and Herzegovina
- Coordinates: 43°32′N 18°38′E
- Country: Bosnia and Herzegovina
- Entity: Republika Srpska
- Municipality: Kalinovik
- Time zone: UTC+1 (CET)
  - Summer (DST): UTC+2 (CEST)

Sela (Serbian Cyrillic: Села) is a village in the municipality of Kalinovik, Republika Srpska, Bosnia and Herzegovina.

Many medieval tombstones with inscriptions in Cyrillic dated to the 15th century were found in Sela.
