= Vihovići, Kalinovik =

Vihovići Виховићи
- Village
- Location within Bosnia and Herzegovina
- Coordinates: 43°30′N 18°29′E
- Country: Bosnia and Herzegovina
- Entity: Republika Srpska
- Municipality: Kalinovik
- Time zone: UTC+1 (CET)
  - Summer (DST): UTC+2 (CEST)

Vihovići (Serbian Cyrillic: Виховићи) is a village in the municipality of Kalinovik, Republika Srpska, Bosnia and Herzegovina.
