= Strane, Kalinovik =

Strane Стране
- Village
- Location within Bosnia and Herzegovina
- Coordinates: 43°26′15″N 18°19′11″E
- Country: Bosnia and Herzegovina
- Entity: Republika Srpska
- Municipality: Kalinovik
- Time zone: UTC+1 (CET)
  - Summer (DST): UTC+2 (CEST)

Strane (Serbian Cyrillic: Стране) is a village in the municipality of Kalinovik, Republika Srpska, Bosnia and Herzegovina.
