= Božanovići =

Božanovići Божановићи
- Village
- Location within Bosnia and Herzegovina
- Coordinates: 43°30′36″N 18°25′19″E
- Country: Bosnia and Herzegovina
- Entity: Republika Srpska
- Municipality: Kalinovik

Population (1991)
  - Total: 66
- Time zone: UTC+1 (CET)
  - Summer (DST): UTC+2 (CEST)

Božanovići (Serbian Cyrillic: Божановићи) is a village in the municipality of Kalinovik, Republika Srpska, Bosnia and Herzegovina. It is located northwest of the town of Kalinovik. In 1991 it had a population of 66 people.

== History ==
During World War II, Božanovići was part of the Independent State of Croatia.

== Geography ==
Božanovići is located northwest of the town of Kalinovik.

== Demographics ==
In 1991 Božanovići had a population of 66 people.

== Notable people ==
- Ratko Mladić, the Bosnian Serb general and commander of the Army of Republika Srpska, sentenced by the International Criminal Tribunal for the former Yugoslavia in The Hague for genocide in Bosnia, was born in Božanovići.
