= Lazarevo =

Lazarevo Лазарево
- Village (Selo)
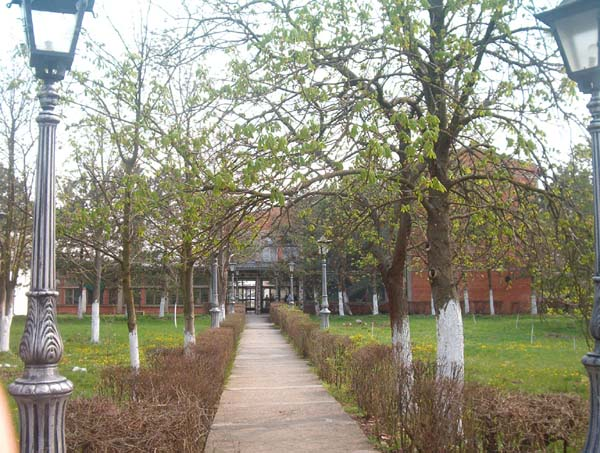
- Lazarevo

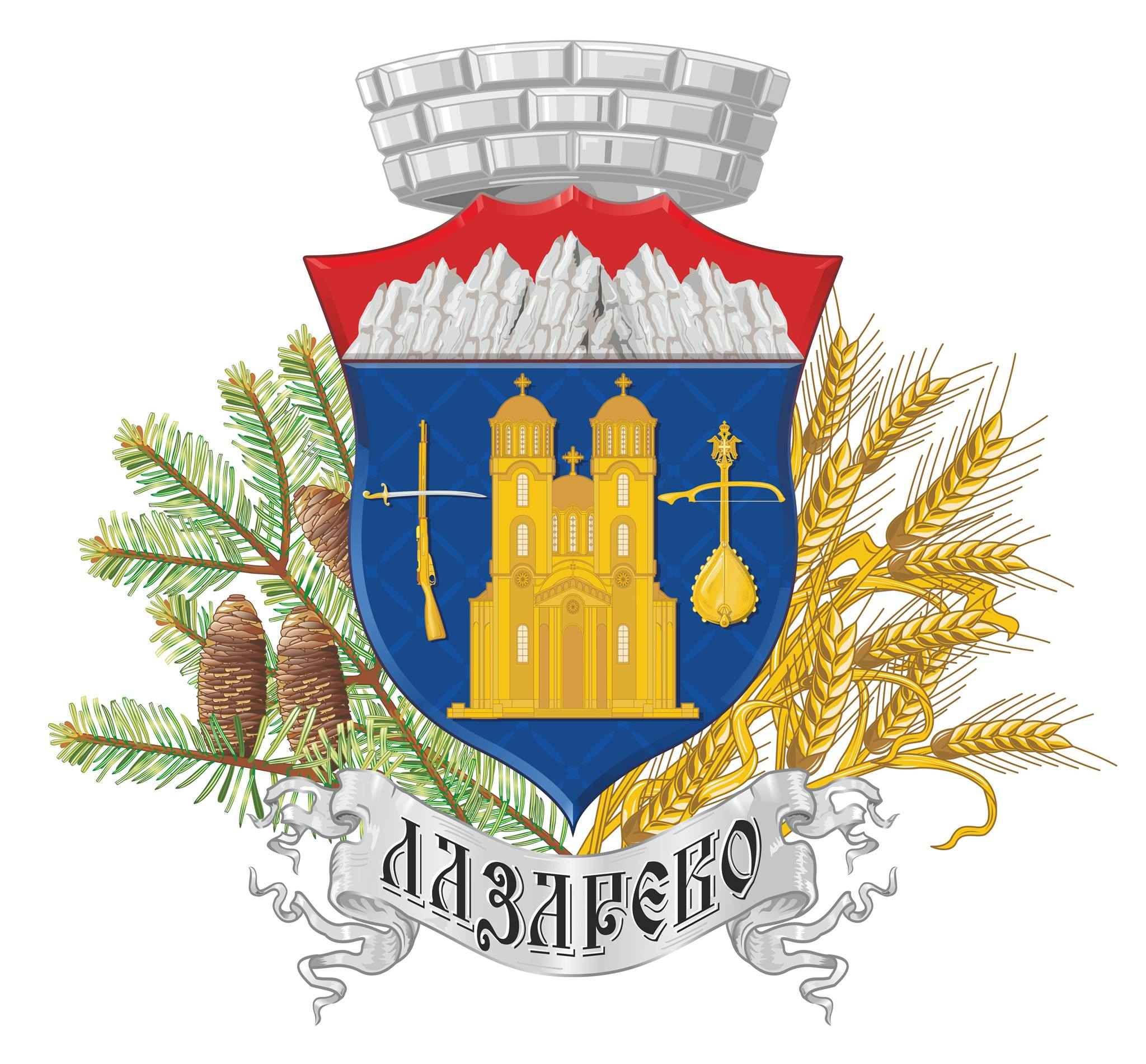
- Coat of arms

- Location within Serbia Lazarevo (Serbia) Lazarevo (Europe)
- Coordinates: 45°23′11″N 20°32′12″E
- Country: Serbia
- Province: Vojvodina
- District: Central Banat
- Municipalities: Zrenjanin
- Elevation: 76 m (249 ft)

Population (2002)
  - Lazarevo: 3,308
- Time zone: UTC+1 (CET)
  - Summer (DST): UTC+2 (CEST)
- Postal code: 23241
- Area code: +381(0)23
- Car plates: ZR

Lazarevo (Serbian Cyrillic: Лазарево; Hungarian: Lázárfő) is a village located in the Zrenjanin municipality, in the Central Banat District of Serbia. It is situated in the Autonomous Province of Vojvodina. The village has a Serb ethnic majority (94.77%) and a total population of 3,308 people (2002 census).

The village is known as the place where Bosnian Serb general Ratko Mladić was arrested on 26 May 2011.

== Name ==
In Serbian, the village is known as Lazarevo (Лазарево), in Croatian as Lazarevo, in Hungarian as Lázárföld, and in German as Lazarfeld. Lazarfeld is also an older name for the village used in Serbian.

== History ==
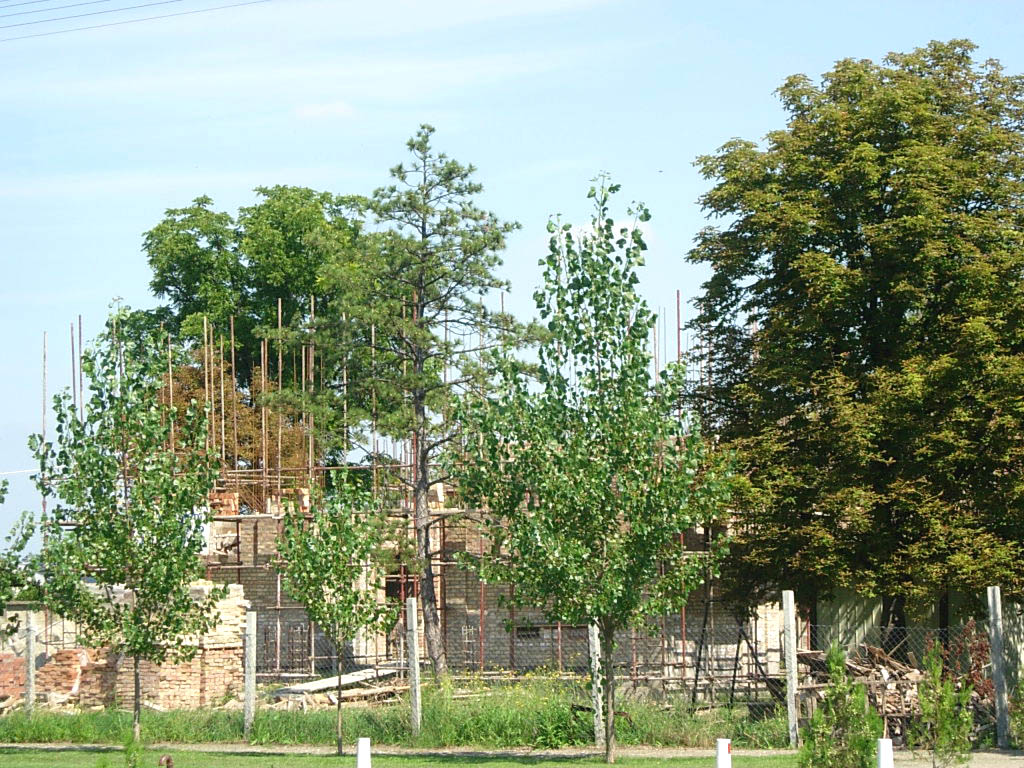
The Orthodox church under construction.

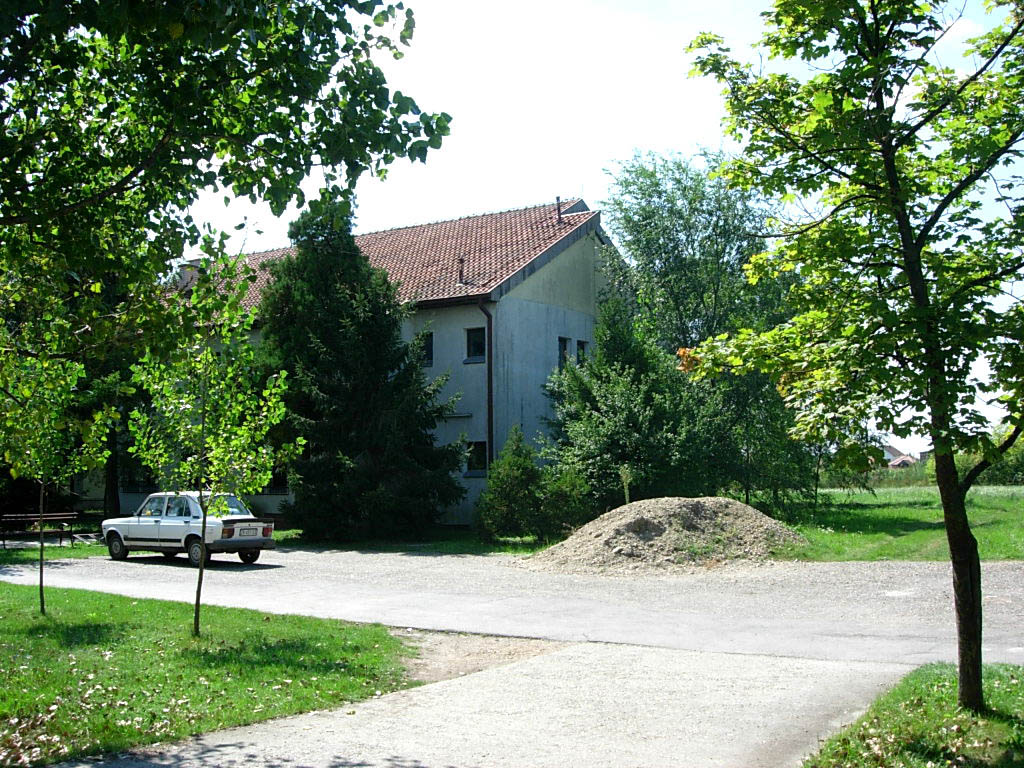
Health centre.

The village was founded in 1809 by German colonists. In 1800, the first German immigrants arrived at the enormous estate of János Lázár de Écska, the son of Lukács Lázár. “Martinica pusta” was determined as a location for their settlement. It was, besides Ečka and Jankov Most, the third settlement founded on Lukács Lázár’s estate. In his honor it was named Lazarfeld.

In 1922, the village changed its name to Lazarevo. Until the end of World War II, it was mostly inhabited by ethnic Germans. After World War II, the German population was placed into concentration camps and the village was colonized by Serb families from Bosnia and Herzegovina.

Lazarevo was the last shelter of the Bosnian Serb general Ratko Mladić who was arrested here by the Serbian special police forces in the early morning hours of 26 May 2011. The arrest took place without incident as Mladić surrendered himself as well as two pistols that he carried.

== Historical population ==
- 1961: 3,313
- 1971: 3,430
- 1981: 3,480
- 1991: 3,450

== Features ==
There are around 3,000 inhabitants in about 900 households. The working people are mostly employed in Zrenjanin, and agriculture is a supplemental activity. The local population mostly assembled by the cultural society “Slaviša Vajner – Cica”, the volunteer fire Society, and the hunters associations. The local Protestant church was reconstructed and turned into the first Orthodox church in 1998. Under the name “Zadrugar”, four sports clubs exist, and its football team gave a few Yugoslav representatives.

== Education ==
There is a primary school, "Slavko Rodić" in the village for children from Lazarevo and the village of Zlatica. Lazarevo does not have a high school, so children from Lazarevo and Zlatica have to go to school in Zrenjanin, or in the nearby town of Sečanj.

== Notable residents ==
- Nenad Bjeković, former Serbian football player
- Jovo Simanić, former Serbian football player
- Ratko Mladić, former general the Army of Republika Srpska (VRS)
- Vladimir Savčić Čobi, former singer and actor
- Maja Simanić, former volleyball player

== Sport ==
- FK Zadrugar Lazarevo
- KK Zadrugar Lazarevo

== See also ==
- List of places in Serbia
- List of cities, towns and villages in Vojvodina
