= Šivolji =

Šivolji Шивољи
- Village
- Location within Bosnia and Herzegovina
- Coordinates: 43°32′04″N 18°30′40″E
- Country: Bosnia and Herzegovina
- Entity: Republika Srpska
- Municipality: Kalinovik
- Time zone: UTC+1 (CET)
  - Summer (DST): UTC+2 (CEST)

Šivolji (Serbian Cyrillic: Шивољи) is a village in the municipality of Kalinovik, Republika Srpska, Bosnia and Herzegovina.
