= Polje, Kalinovik =

Coordinates: 43.5183°N 18.3194°E

Polje Поље
- Village
- Location within Republika Srpska
- Country: Bosnia and Herzegovina
- Entity: Republika Srpska
- Municipality: Kalinovik
- Time zone: UTC+1 (CET)
  - Summer (DST): UTC+2 (CEST)

Polje (Serbian Cyrillic: Поље) is a village in the municipality of Kalinovik, Republika Srpska, Bosnia and Herzegovina.
