= Kolakovići =

Kolakovići Колаковићи
- Village
- Location within Bosnia and Herzegovina
- Coordinates: 43°36′49″N 18°33′10″E
- Country: Bosnia and Herzegovina
- Entity: Republika Srpska
- Municipality: Kalinovik
- Time zone: UTC+1 (CET)
  - Summer (DST): UTC+2 (CEST)

Kolakovići (Serbian Cyrillic: Колаковићи) is a village in the municipality of Kalinovik, Republika Srpska, Bosnia and Herzegovina.

The population is 205.
