= Vladimir Savčić =

Vladimir Savčić (born 6 June 1948 in Niš, Serbia, FPR Yugoslavia - died 20 March 2009 in Belgrade, Serbia) was a Serbian singer. Widely known as Čobi (after Chubby Checker), he was most prominent as the singer of a popular band Pro arte during the late 1960s and 1970s. He's had a long career in music both before and after. One of his best known solo hits was "Gdje ste noćas prijatelji" from 1999. He died on March 20, 2009, of colon cancer after struggles with obesity.

Born in the family of a Yugoslav People's Army officer from Sokolac. His family was colonized in Lazarevo after the Second World War. Young Vladimir moved around Yugoslavia a lot wherever it was that his father was stationed. The family eventually settled in Sarajevo.

Awards and achievements
Preceded by Tanja Banjanin	Pjesma Mediterana winner (with Mima Karadžić); 1998	Succeeded by Leontina
