= Golubići, Kalinovik =

Golubići Голубићи
- Village
- Location within Bosnia and Herzegovina
- Coordinates: 43°30′34″N 18°24′09″E
- Country: Bosnia and Herzegovina
- Entity: Republika Srpska
- Municipality: Kalinovik

Population (1991)
  - Total: 75
- Time zone: UTC+1 (CET)
  - Summer (DST): UTC+2 (CEST)

Golubići (Serbian Cyrillic: Голубићи) is a village in the municipality of Kalinovik, Republika Srpska, Bosnia and Herzegovina.
