= Gradina, Kalinovik =

Gradina Градина
- Village
- Location within Bosnia and Herzegovina
- Coordinates: 43°31′30″N 18°27′20″E
- Country: Bosnia and Herzegovina
- Entity: Republika Srpska
- Municipality: Kalinovik
- Time zone: UTC+1 (CET)
  - Summer (DST): UTC+2 (CEST)

Gradina (Serbian Cyrillic: Градина) is a village in the municipality of Kalinovik, Republika Srpska, Bosnia and Herzegovina.
