= Susječno =

Susječno Сусјечно
- Village
- Location within Bosnia and Herzegovina
- Coordinates: 43°28′12″N 18°14′00″E
- Country: Bosnia and Herzegovina
- Entity: Republika Srpska
- Municipality: Kalinovik
- Time zone: UTC+1 (CET)
  - Summer (DST): UTC+2 (CEST)

Susječno (Serbian Cyrillic: Сусјечно) is a village in the municipality of Kalinovik, Republika Srpska, Bosnia and Herzegovina.
