= Tmuše =

Tmuše Тмуше
- Village
- Location within Bosnia and Herzegovina
- Coordinates: 43°26′N 18°20′E
- Country: Bosnia and Herzegovina
- Entity: Republika Srpska
- Municipality: Kalinovik
- Time zone: UTC+1 (CET)
  - Summer (DST): UTC+2 (CEST)

Tmuše (Serbian Cyrillic: Тмуше) is a village in the municipality of Kalinovik, Republika Srpska, Bosnia and Herzegovina.
