= Brda, Konjic =

Brda Брда
- Village
- Location within Bosnia and Herzegovina
- Coordinates: 43°30′20″N 18°19′27″E
- Country: Bosnia and Herzegovina
- Entity: Federation of Bosnia and Herzegovina
- Municipality: Konjic
- Time zone: UTC+1 (CET)
  - Summer (DST): UTC+2 (CEST)

Brda (Serbian Cyrillic: Брда) is a village in the municipality of Kalinovik, Bosnia and Herzegovina.
