= Varizi =

Varizi Варизи
- Village
- Location within Bosnia and Herzegovina
- Coordinates: 43°37′N 18°32′E
- Country: Bosnia and Herzegovina
- Entity: Republika Srpska
- Municipality: Kalinovik
- Time zone: UTC+1 (CET)
  - Summer (DST): UTC+2 (CEST)

Varizi (Serbian Cyrillic: Варизи) is a village in the municipality of Kalinovik, Republika Srpska, Bosnia and Herzegovina.
