= Nedavić =

Nedavić Недавић
- Village
- Location within Bosnia and Herzegovina
- Coordinates: 43°27′03″N 18°19′29″E
- Country: Bosnia and Herzegovina
- Entity: Republika Srpska
- Municipality: Kalinovik
- Time zone: UTC+1 (CET)
  - Summer (DST): UTC+2 (CEST)

Nedavić (Serbian Cyrillic: Недавић) is a village in the municipality of Kalinovik, Republika Srpska, Bosnia and Herzegovina.
