= Trnovica, Kalinovik =

Trnovica Трновица
- Village
- Location within Bosnia and Herzegovina
- Coordinates: 43°20′44″N 18°24′48″E
- Country: Bosnia and Herzegovina
- Entity: Republika Srpska
- Municipality: Kalinovik
- Time zone: UTC+1 (CET)
  - Summer (DST): UTC+2 (CEST)

Trnovica (Serbian Cyrillic: Трновица) is a village in the municipality of Kalinovik, Republika Srpska, Bosnia and Herzegovina.
