= Ratko Mladić =

Bosnian Serb general and war criminal (1942–2026)

- Ратко Младић
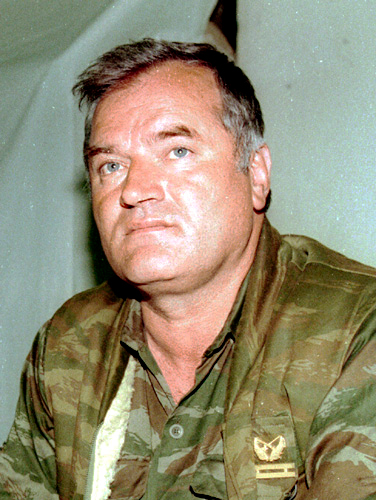
- Mladić in 1993
- Born: 12 March 1942; Božanovići, Independent State of Croatia (modern-day Bosnia and Herzegovina)
- Died: 27 August 2026 (aged 84); United Nations Detention Unit, The Hague, Netherlands
- Political party: Serb Democratic Party
- Other political affiliations: League of Communists of Yugoslavia (1965–1990)
- Children: 2
- Convictions: Genocide; War crimes (4 counts); Crimes against humanity (5 counts)
- Penalty: Life imprisonment

Details
- Country: Bosnia and Herzegovina
- Military career
- Allegiance: Socialist Federal Republic of Yugoslavia; Republic of Serbian Krajina; Republika Srpska
- Branch: Yugoslav People's Army (until 1992); Army of Republika Srpska (1992–1996)
- Service years: 1965–1996
- Rank: Colonel-general
- Units: Armored divisions, artillery, special forces
- Commands: 9th Corps (JNA); 2nd Military District Headquarters (JNA); Chief of the VRS General Staff
- Conflicts: Yugoslav Wars; Croatian War of Independence; Bosnian War
- Awards: Order of Brotherhood and Unity (II); Order of Military Merits (III); Order of Military Merits (II); Order of the People's Army (II)

Ratko Mladić (Serbian Cyrillic: Ратко Младић, pronounced [râtko mlǎːdit͡ɕ]; 12 March 1942 – 27 August 2026) was a Bosnian Serb military officer who led the Army of Republika Srpska (VRS) during the Yugoslav Wars with the rank of colonel general. Referred to as the "Butcher of Bosnia", (Note: Sources:) he was found guilty in 2017 of committing war crimes, crimes against humanity, and genocide by the International Criminal Tribunal for the former Yugoslavia (ICTY) during the Bosnian War of 1992–1995. He served a life sentence for these crimes in The Hague until his death in 2026.

A long-time member of the League of Communists of Yugoslavia, Mladić began his career in the Yugoslav People's Army (JNA) in 1965. He came to prominence during the Yugoslav Wars, initially as a high-ranking officer of the JNA and subsequently as the chief of staff of the VRS in the Bosnian War. In July 1996, the Trial Chamber of the ICTY, proceeding in the absence of Mladić under the ICTY's Rule 61, confirmed all counts of the original indictments, finding there were reasonable grounds to believe he had committed the alleged crimes, and issued an international arrest warrant. The Serbian and United States governments offered €5 million for information leading to Mladić's capture and arrest, but he remained at large for nearly sixteen years, initially sheltered by Serbian and Bosnian Serb security forces and later by family.

In 2011, Mladić was arrested in Lazarevo, Serbia, and extradited to The Hague. His capture was considered to be one of the pre-conditions for Serbia being awarded candidate status for European Union membership. His trial formally commenced in 2012 and lasted until 2017, when he was sentenced to life in prison by the ICTY after being found guilty of ten charges: one of genocide, five of crimes against humanity and four of violations of the laws or customs of war. He was cleared of one further count of genocide. As the top military officer with command responsibility, Mladić was deemed by the ICTY to be responsible for both the siege of Sarajevo and the Srebrenica massacre. Mladić was denied numerous requests for compassionate release due to terminal illness while incarcerated.

== Early life and military career ==
Mladić was born in Božanovići near Kalinovik, at the time part of the Independent State of Croatia, on 12 March 1942.

His father, Neđa (1909–1945), was a member of the Yugoslav Partisans. His mother, Stana (née Lalović; 1919–2003), raised her three children; daughter Milica (born 1940), sons Ratko and Milivoje (1944–2001), by herself after the death of her husband in 1945 during World War II. Bosnia and Herzegovina was at the time part of the Independent State of Croatia, a fascist puppet state led by the Croatian Ustaše between 1941 and 1945, installed by Nazi Germany and Fascist Italy after having invaded and partitioned the Kingdom of Yugoslavia in 1941. Mladić's father Neđa was killed in action (on Mladić's third birthday) while leading a Partisan attack on the home village of Ustaše leader Ante Pavelić in 1945.

Upon finishing elementary school, Mladić worked in Sarajevo as a whitesmith for the PRETIS company. He entered the Military Industry School in Zemun in 1961. He then went on to the KOV Military Academy and the Officers Academy thereafter. Upon graduating on 27 September 1965, Mladić began his career in the Yugoslav People's Army. In the same year he joined the League of Communists of Yugoslavia, remaining a member until the party disintegrated in 1990. Mladić was initially posted to Macedonia and rose through the ranks in the following decades, commanding a platoon, an armoured battallion, and a brigade in succession.

On 31 January 1989, Mladić was promoted to be head of the Education Department of the Third Military District of Skopje. On 14 January 1991, he was promoted again, to Deputy Commander in Priština.

== Role in the Yugoslav Wars ==
In June 1991, Mladić was promoted to Deputy Commander of the Priština Corps in the Socialist Autonomous Province of Kosovo at a time of high tension between Kosovo Serbs and Kosovo's majority Albanian population. That year, Mladić was given command of the 9th Corps, and led this formation against Croatian forces in Knin, the capital of the self-declared Republic of Serbian Krajina.

On 4 October 1991, Mladić was promoted to major general. The JNA forces under his command participated in the Croatian War, notably during Operation Coast-91 in an attempt to cut off Dalmatia from the rest of Croatia, which resulted in a stalemate (the Croats held the entire coastline near Zadar and Šibenik, and Serb Krajina expanded its territory in the hinterland). Among other early operations, Mladić aided Milan Martić's militia in the 1991 siege of Kijevo and the battle of Zadar.

On 24 April 1992, Mladić was promoted to the rank of lieutenant colonel general. On 2 May 1992, one month after Bosnia and Hercegovina's declaration of independence, Mladić and his generals blockaded the city of Sarajevo, shutting off all traffic in and out of the city, as well as water and electricity. This began the four-year siege of Sarajevo, the longest siege of a city in the history of modern warfare. The city was bombarded with shells and sniper shooting. On 9 May 1992, he assumed the post of Chief of Staff/Deputy Commander of the Second Military District Headquarters of the JNA in Sarajevo. The next day, Mladić assumed the command of the Second Military District Headquarters of the JNA. On 12 May 1992, in response to Bosnia's secession from Yugoslavia, the Bosnian Serb Parliament voted to create the Army of Republika Srpska (VRS). At the same time, Mladić was appointed Commander of the Main Staff of the VRS, a position he held until December 1996. During the 16th session of the Bosnian-Serb Assembly on 12 May 1992, Radovan Karadžić announced his "six strategic objectives", including "Demarcation of the state as separate from the other two national communities", "A corridor between Semberija and Krajina" and "Establishment of a corridor in the Drina river valley, and the eradication of the Drina river as a border between the Serbian states." Mladić then said:

There we cannot cleanse nor can we have a sieve to sift so that only Serbs would stay, or that the Serbs would fall through and the rest leave. ... I do not know how Mr Krajišnik and Mr Karadžić would explain this to the world. People, that would be genocide. We have to call upon any man who has bowed his forehead to the ground to embrace these areas and the territory of the state we plan to make.

In May 1992, after the withdrawal of JNA forces from Bosnia, the JNA Second Military District became the nucleus of the Main Staff of the VRS. On 24 June 1994, he was promoted to the rank of colonel general over approximately 80,000 troops stationed in the area.

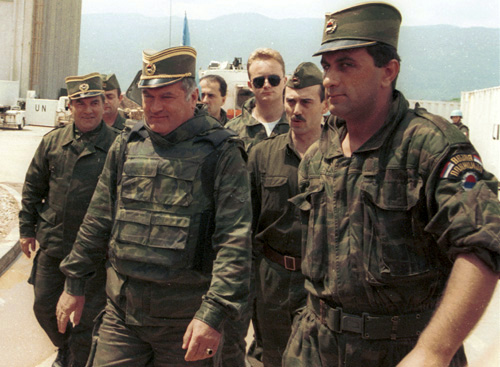
Mladić alongside Army of Republika Srpska officers arriving for UN-mediated talks at Sarajevo Airport, June 1993

In July 1995, troops commanded by Mladić overran and occupied the "UN Safe Areas" of Srebrenica and Žepa. At Srebrenica over 40,000 Bosniaks who had sought safety there were expelled. An estimated 8,300 were murdered, on Mladić's order. After Srebrenica fell, Mladić later stated on camera:

Here we are ... in Serb Srebrenica. On the eve of yet another Serb holiday, we give this town to the Serb people as a gift. Finally, after the rebellion against the dahis, the time has come to take revenge on the Turks in this region.

This statement was used by Mladić as a justification to seek "revenge" for the Ottoman rule of Bosnia and Herzegovina and against the "Turks" in the area.

On 4 August 1995, with a huge Croatian military force poised to attack the Serb-held region in central Croatia, Radovan Karadžić announced he was removing Mladić from his post and assuming personal command of the VRS himself. Karadžić blamed Mladić for the loss of two key Serb towns in western Bosnia that had recently fallen to the Croatian army, and he used the loss of the towns as an excuse to announce his surprising changes in the command structure. Mladić was demoted to an "adviser". He refused to go quietly, claiming the support of both the Bosnian Serb military as well as the people. Karadžić countered by denouncing Mladić as a "madman" and attempting to remove his political rank, but Mladić's obvious popular support forced Karadžić to rescind his order on 11 August. His actions during the war led to many dubbing him "The Butcher of Bosnia".

Several of Mladić's conversations were recorded during the war:

In an intercepted conversation on 23 May 1992, Mladić told Fikret Abdić that he was 'here for peace', but threatened reprisal attacks if his demands were not met and stated that he would 'order the shelling of entire Bihać ... and it will burn too'. Mladić warned Abdić that '[t]he whole of Bosnia will burn if I start to "speak"'. Mladić then threatened that the Bosnian leadership, which included Abdić, caused 'all of this' and stated that if his demands to Abdić were not met, he would 'not leave Sarajevo alone as long as anyone's breathing in it'... Mladić said 'So, we went slowly to capture these valleys and clean up that Turkish rubble'. Mladić added that he was afraid 'the guys from down there' would allow the refugees – whom he described as 'Turks' and Croats – to return, stating this was why they 'should see what we need to do and how to do it'. In another recorded conversation between Mladić and Karadžić on the same day, Mladić stated that he had earlier said to Professor Koljević, 'fuck the Turks in Žepa, in Srebrenica, in Goražde.

— ICTY, in its verdict against Mladić.

On 8 November 1996, Biljana Plavšić, the president of the Bosnian Serb Republic, dismissed Mladić from his post. He continued to receive a pension until November 2005.

== Indictment by the ICTY ==
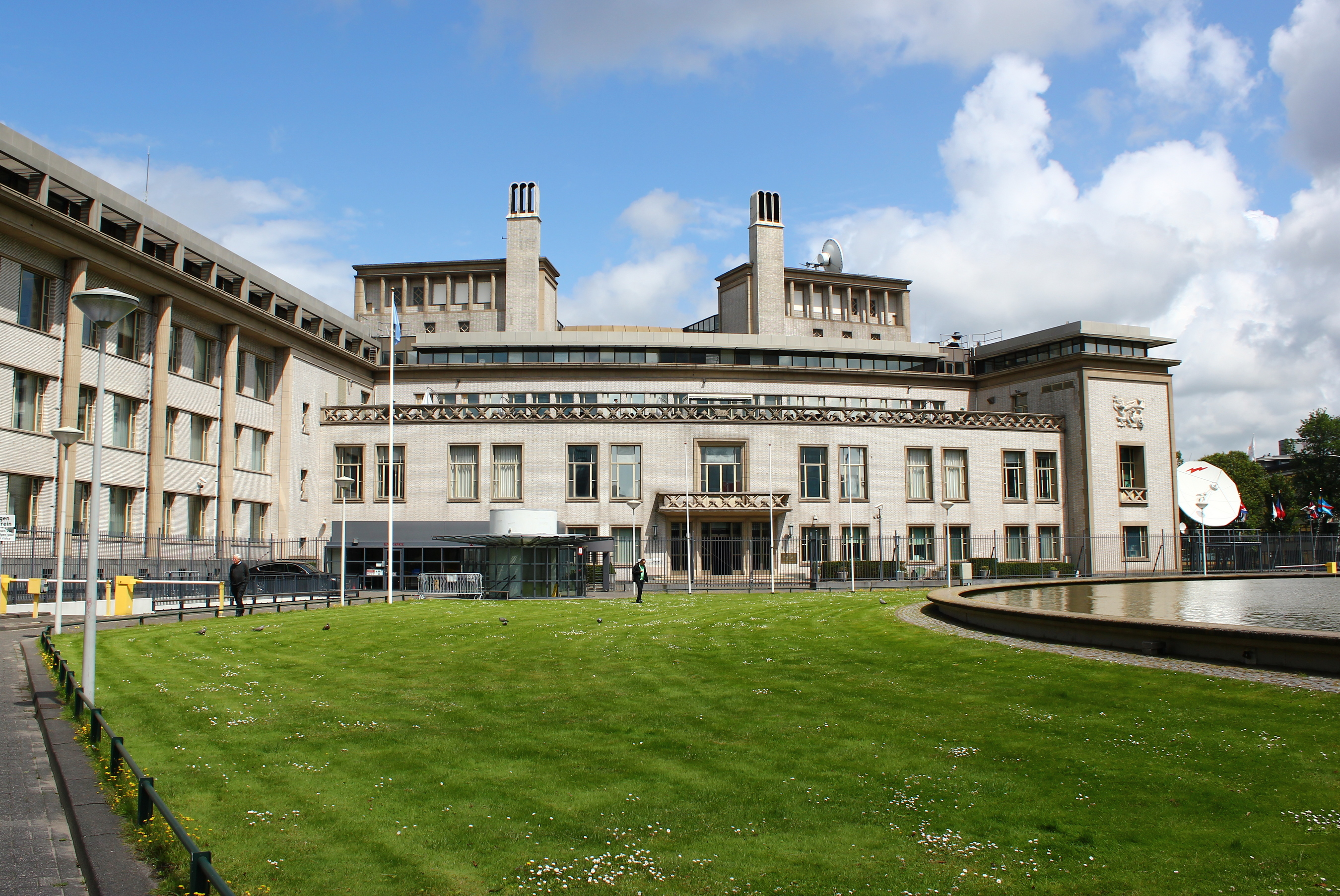
The International Criminal Tribunal for the former Yugoslavia building in the Hague

On 24 July 1995, Mladić was indicted by the International Criminal Tribunal for the Former Yugoslavia (ICTY) for genocide, crimes against humanity, and numerous war crimes (including crimes relating to the alleged sniping campaign against civilians in Sarajevo). On 16 November 1995, the charges were expanded to include charges of war crimes for the attack on the UN-declared safe area of Srebrenica in July 1995.

A fugitive from the ICTY, he was suspected to be hiding either in Serbia or in Republika Srpska. Mladić was reportedly seen attending a football match between the People's Republic of China and Yugoslavia in Belgrade in March 2000. He entered through a VIP entrance and sat in a private box surrounded by eight armed bodyguards. There were claims that he had been seen in a suburb of Moscow, and that he "regularly" visited Thessaloniki and Athens, which raised suspicions that numerous fake reports were sent to cover his trail. Some reports said that he took refuge in his wartime bunker in Han Pijesak, not far from Sarajevo, or in Montenegro.

In early February 2006, portions of a Serbian military intelligence report were leaked to Serbian newspaper Politika which stated that Mladić had been hidden in Army of Republika Srpska and Yugoslav army facilities up until 1 June 2002, when the National Assembly of Serbia passed a law mandating cooperation with the ICTY in The Hague.

Initially, Mladić lived freely in Belgrade. After the arrest of Slobodan Milošević in 2001, Mladić went into hiding, but he was still protected by Serb security services and the army. Serbia's failure to bring Mladić to justice seriously harmed its relationship with the European Union.

In 2004, Paddy Ashdown, then-United Nations high representative in Bosnia and Herzegovina, removed 58 officials from their posts due to suspicions that they helped war crimes suspects including Mladić and Karadžić to evade capture. Some officials were subjected to travel bans and had their bank accounts frozen. The ban was later lifted after the capture of Mladić.

In November 2004, British defense officials conceded that military action was unlikely to be successful in bringing Mladić and other suspects to trial. One winter's day British UN troops carrying sidearms were confronted by the general skiing down the piste at Sarajevo's former Olympic skiing resort but made no move for their guns; skiing behind Mladić were four bodyguards. Despite his Hague warrant, the British soldiers decided to carry on skiing. NATO later sent commandos to arrest various war crimes suspects, but Mladić simply went underground. No amount of NATO action or UN demands, or even a $5 million bounty announced by Washington, could bring him in.

It was revealed in December 2004 that the Army of Republika Srpska had been harboring and protecting Mladić until the summer of 2004, despite repeated and public pleas to collaborate with the ICTY and apprehend war criminals. On 6 December, NATO said that Mladić visited his wartime bunker during the summer in order to celebrate Army of Republika Srpska Day.

In June 2005, The Times newspaper alleged that Mladić had demanded a $5 million (£2.75 million) "compensation" to be given to his family and bodyguards if he gave himself up to the ICTY in the Hague. In January 2006, a Belgrade court indicted 10 people for aiding Mladić in hiding from 2002 to January 2006. An investigation showed Mladić spent his time in New Belgrade, a suburb of the capital.

It was erroneously reported on 21 February 2006 that Mladić had been arrested in Belgrade and was being transferred via Tuzla to the ICTY war tribunal. The arrest was denied by the Serbian government. The government did not deny rumors of a planned negotiated surrender between Mladić and Serbian special forces. Romanian government and Serbian sources claimed on 22 February 2006 that Mladić was arrested in Romania, near Drobeta-Turnu Severin, close to the Serbian border by a joint Romanian-British special operation carried out by troops of those respective nations. However, ICTY prosecutor Carla Del Ponte denied the rumors that Mladić had been arrested, saying that they had "absolutely no basis whatsoever". Del Ponte urged the Serbian government to locate him without further delay, saying Mladić was within the reach of the Serbian authorities and had been in Serbia since 1998. She said a failure to capture him would harm Serbia's bid to join the European Union (EU). 1 May 2006 deadline established by Del Ponte for Serbia to hand over Mladić passed, resulting in talks between Serbia and the EU being suspended. The EU considered Mladić's arrest, along with full cooperation with the ICTY, pre-conditions that had to be met before Serbia could join the organization.

In July 2008, Serbian officials voiced concern that Mladić would order or had ordered his bodyguards to kill him to prevent him from being captured to face trial.

Based on a March 2009 poll of the NGO Strategic Marketing for the television station B92, which involved 1,050 respondents, 14% of Serbia's citizens would reveal information that would lead to his arrest in exchange for €1 million, 21% did not have a determined attitude, and 65% would not divulge information for €1 million (the poll was conducted when the United States embassy issued a reward of €1.3 million for any information on Mladić). However, it was noted that the formulation of the question might have been a problem, as the polling samples which opted "No" included also those who would immediately report Mladić without payment, believing that payment in this case is immoral. Although preceding reports indicated that 47% supported the extradition, it was apparent that most of the population was against it. According to a poll conducted by the National Committee for Cooperation with the ICTY, 78% of those polled would not report Mladić to the authorities, with 40% believing that he was a hero. Only 34% said they would approve of Mladić's arrest.

On 11 June 2009, a Bosnian television station broadcast videos of Mladić, filmed over the previous decade. The last video that was featured in the show 60 Minuta showed Mladić with two women, allegedly filmed in the winter of 2008. However, no evidence for this was given by television presenters. Serbia stated that it was "impossible" for the videos to have been filmed in 2008. Rasim Ljajić, Serbia's minister in charge of co-operation with the UN tribunal, confirmed that the footage was old and had already been handed over to the ICTY in March 2009. Ljajić claimed "the last known footage was taken eight years ago. The last time Mladić was in military premises was at the Krcmari army barracks near [the western Serbian town of] Valjevo on 1 June 2002." The previously unseen images show Mladić in various restaurants and apartments and at what appears to be military barracks in Serbia, almost always accompanied by his wife Bosa and son Darko.

On 16 June 2010, Mladić's family filed a request to declare him dead, claiming he had been in poor health and absent for seven years. If the declaration had been approved Mladić's wife would have been able to collect a state pension and sell his property. At this time, Mladić was hiding in a house owned by his family.

In October 2010, Serbia increased the reward for Mladić's capture from €5 million to €10 million.

== Arrest, trial and conviction ==
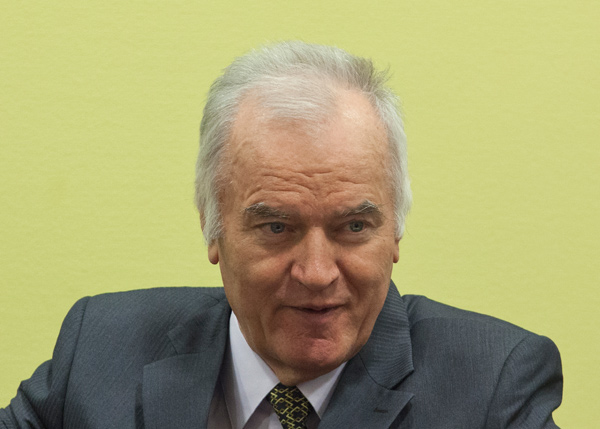
Mladić in court, May 2012

Mladić was arrested on 26 May 2011 in Lazarevo, northern Serbia, where he had been staying at a relative's house. His arrest was carried out by two dozen officers wearing black uniforms and masks. They had been sent to check the house of Mladić's relatives but did not have a specific reason to believe he was there. At the time of his arrest, Mladić had been about to go for an early morning walk. He identified himself to police and surrendered two handguns he had been carrying. He was then taken to Belgrade.

Serbian president Boris Tadić confirmed Mladić's arrest at a press conference and announced that the process of extraditing him to the ICTY was underway. Mladić had been using the pseudonym "Milorad Komadić" while in hiding, but was not wearing a disguise when arrested. His appearance reportedly showed he had "aged considerably", and one of his arms was paralyzed due to a series of strokes.

Following his arrest, Mladić appeared before the Belgrade Higher Court for a hearing on whether he was fit to be extradited to The Hague. Judge Milan Dilparić suspended interrogation due to his poor health. Mladić's lawyer Miloš Šaljić said that his poor health prevented him from properly communicating. He was allegedly unable to confirm his personal data, but attempted to talk to the prosecutors on several occasions, especially to Deputy War Crimes Prosecutor Bruno Vekarić.

However, the court ruled that he was fit to be extradited on 27 May. According to the Serbian Health Ministry, a team of prison doctors described his health as stable following checkups. Mladić was also visited in prison by Health Minister Zoran Stanković, a former friend. Mladić was extradited to The Hague on 31 May 2011, and his trial formally opened in The Hague on 16 May 2012. Mladić also survived a heart attack in his detention unit on 23 December 2013.

Mladić was arrested on the same day the EU's representative, Catherine Ashton, was visiting Belgrade. His arrest improved Serbia's relations with the EU, which had been concerned that Serbia had been sheltering Mladić. In July 2015, media reports alleged Mladić had been "trying to find one Norwegian officer to have him come to The Hague as a witness" in the trial.

In 2017, the International Criminal Tribunal for the former Yugoslavia (ICTY) convicted Mladić on 10 charges: one of genocide, five of crimes against humanity, and four of violations of the laws or customs of war. He was cleared of one count of genocide. As a top military officer with command responsibility, Mladić was deemed, by the ICTY, to be responsible for both the siege of Sarajevo and the Srebrenica massacre. The ICTY sentenced Mladić to life imprisonment. After his conviction, former commissioner of the OHCHR, Zeid Ra'ad al-Hussein described Mladic as the "epitome of evil".

In 2018, during the appeals process, three out of the five judges on the appeals court were removed by the Mechanism for International Criminal Tribunals (MITC), because they "appear[ed] biased", considering that they had previously rendered certain conclusions linked to Mladić in other cases in The Hague.

In January 2019, the pre-appeals chamber partially granted a prosecution request and struck three of five motions which Mladić filed to submit new evidence. On 7 June 2019, Mladić requested to have an extension in his appeals motions, which was granted. On 13 June 2019, it was announced at a status conference that Mladić was diagnosed with "harmless arrhythmia" and scheduling for the potential appeals hearings still had not started either. On 10 July 2019, Mladić was hospitalized following a health scare, but was then discharged and transferred back to The Hague detention unit on 12 July after the illness was determined to be non-life-threatening and not a sign of increased heart problems.

The first appeal hearing was held on 25 and 26 August 2020. On 3 September 2020, the five judge panel representing the MITC's Appeals Chamber voted 4–1 to reject Mladić's request for future hospitalization outside his Hague detention center. On 8 June 2021, Mladić's final appeal was rejected, and his life imprisonment sentence confirmed. He spent the rest of his life serving out his prison sentence in The Hague.

In 2025, Mladić was reported to be terminally ill with only months to live. A request for compassionate release was denied. In April 2026, Mladić suffered a health emergency and was briefly admitted to hospital. Following the incident, his lawyers made another request for compassionate release, claiming Mladić was facing "advanced, irreversible decline". His bid for Mladić's release was rejected in May by a UN court in The Hague, as he was receiving "comprehensive and compassionate treatment" in prison for his "dire" condition. Before his death, in August 2026, a doctor from the UN stated that Mladić's death "may occur at any time," possibly within weeks.

== Personal life ==
Mladić and his wife Bosiljka married in 1966 and had two children; a son named Darko and a daughter, Ana.

Ana died in 1994, aged 23, in an apparent suicide. There were conflicting reports in Serbian publications regarding her death and the discovery of her body. Some said her body was found in her blood-splattered bedroom, others in a nearby park or in the woods near the Topčider cemetery. It was concluded that she had used her father's handgun, which he had been awarded at military school in his youth. There are also conflicting opinions regarding the potential reasons for her suicide, with one of the more common theories being that she had been under immense pressure from the general public as her father was frequently chided and scrutinized in the Serbian newspapers for his actions against civilians in Bosnia. Another theory points to the death of her boyfriend Dragan, who had been killed in the Bosnian War. Historian Jože Pirjevec supports this theory, writing that she killed herself to punish her father for sending her boyfriend to fight on the front line, and for failing to inform her about his death. Until his death, Mladić maintained that she was murdered, and did not die by suicide.

== Death ==
Mladić died at the United Nations Detention Unit in The Hague, on 27 August 2026, after suffering several strokes. He was 84.

Thousands attended Mladić's funeral in Belgrade, with the service being led by the Serbian Patriach Porfirije. A Serbian government minister's earlier announcement that he would receive a state funeral was reversed following objections from several European leaders. The European Union condemned the "glorification" of Mladić, stating that praise of war criminals, genocide denial and historical revisionism contradicted European values and had no place in the EU or candidate countries. In response to the funeral, the United Kingdom summoned Serbia's chargé d'affaires and Bosnia and Herzegovina expelled two Serbian diplomats for "crossing a red line".

=== Reactions ===
==== Bosnia and Herzegovina ====
The head of the Srebrenica Genocide Memorial, Emir Suljagić, stated that Mladić's death "does not bring back the dead. It doesn't clear mass graves. It does not change judgment. It does not turn the criminal into a historical figure." Ćamil Duraković, Vice President of Republika Srpska, former mayor of Srebrenica and Srebrenica survivor, noted that Mladić "outlived" his victims by decades, stating that: "More than anything, we feel the bitterness that he lived to such an advanced age while thousands of others, unfortunately, did not." Bosniaks and survivors of his campaigns criticized the denials of his crimes.

Milorad Dodik, former President of Republika Srpska from 2022 until his removal in 2025, called Mladić's death a "murder" and praised him as a "commander and he stood to defend Serbs." In cities and towns in Republika Srpska, Serbs mourned and glorified Mladić in public gatherings. War veterans and government officials also attended such gatherings. The gathering in Zvornik was condemned by Duraković.

==== Croatia ====
The speaker of the Croatian Parliament, Gordan Jandroković, condemned the expression of condolences by the president of the Montenegrin Parliament, Andrija Mandić, to Mladić's son and said that Montenegro cannot count on Croatia's support for its EU accession as long as leaders of Montenegrin institutions continue to make such statements. The Ministry of Foreign and European Affairs also condemned the expression of condolences calling it "unacceptable". Minister of Defense, Ivan Anušić, said he regretted that Mladić had not been convicted of war crimes in Croatia, and added that he would be remembered as a man convicted of genocide. The Ministry of Croatian Veterans called Mladić "a symbol of the collapse and defeat of an ideology and regime that left behind horrific devastation and thousands of murdered innocent civilians", and expressed regret that he was never held accountable for the Škabrnja massacre.

The Bridge party condemned the decision to bury Mladić in Serbia with the highest state honors, and called for "the strongest possible diplomatic response" from the Government of Croatia.

==== Serbia ====
Pro-government media outlets glorified his role in the wars. War criminal and president of the far-right Serbian Radical Party Vojislav Šešelj praised Mladić's actions, stating that he "fought" against "villains". Former Interior Minister Aleksandar Vulin, stated that Serbia should organise a state funeral and a day of mourning for Mladić. Serbia's Justice Minister Nenad Vujić announced that Mladić would be interred with "all the military and state honours", and reportedly accompanied his body when it was flown into Belgrade to be buried. Dragan J. Vučićević, editor of the tabloid, the Informer, called the Hague Tribunal a "terrorist organization" and claimed that the tribunal "killed" Mladić. Serbian leftists and members of the opposition pointed out his crimes. Aleksandar Radovanović, general-secretary of the opposition party Movement of Free Citizens, issued a tweet stating that Mladić's death was "the only correct way to write the lead of today's news". Aleksandar Vučić, President of Serbia, accused the UNDU of "uncivilized behavior" and for refusing to grant an early release for Mladić.

On 28 August, the UEFA announced that the organisation has opened disciplinary proceedings against the Serbian football club Red Star Belgrade after it posted images on social media, showing fans held up banners in Serbian, stating, "General, eternal glory and thanks" and chanted Mladić's name during a match against FC Viktoria Plzeň. The Srebrenica Memorial Centre also submitted a complaint to UEFA, stating that the club's messages "glorified a man legally convicted of genocide cannot reduce such behavior to the behavior of fans" and called for the club's exclusion from UEFA competitions.

==== Other countries and organizations ====
The President of the Parliament of Montenegro and leader of the New Serb Democracy party, Andrija Mandić, expressed condolences to Darko Mladić after the death of his father.

Russia's Ministry of Foreign Affairs posted a statement on Facebook, stating that Mladić was denied basic rights, including the right to health and adequate medical care, and accused the international court of double standards and "anti-Serb bias".

Secretary-General of the United Nations António Guterres announced his solidarity with the victims and condemned any forms of genocide denial as well as actions that "glorify those convicted of war crimes, crimes against humanity and genocide by international courts."

The government of North Macedonia called on Dalibor Kitanović, director of the Agency for the Realization of the Rights of Communities, to retract his statement or resign after he praised Mladić on Instagram. The Democratic Party of Serbs in Macedonia led by Ivan Stoilković praised Mladić on its Facebook page. The Social Democratic Union of Macedonia called for legal action. The glorification was condemned by the Liberal Democratic Party.

European Union's Commissioner for Enlargement Marta Kos called the glorification of Mladić's death "incompatible with the values on which the EU [accession] path is built" and announced that she would not proceed with her planned visit to Serbia in September.

== Notes ==
Military offices
New title Dissolution of Yugoslavia	Commander of the Army of Republika Srpska; 1992–1996	Succeeded by Pero Čolić
