= Vujinovići =

Vujinovići Вујиновићи
- Village
- Location within Bosnia and Herzegovina
- Coordinates: 43°37′02″N 18°33′07″E
- Country: Bosnia and Herzegovina
- Entity: Republika Srpska
- Municipality: Kalinovik
- Time zone: UTC+1 (CET)
  - Summer (DST): UTC+2 (CEST)

Vujinovići (Serbian Cyrillic: Вујиновићи) is a village in the municipality of Kalinovik, Republika Srpska, Bosnia and Herzegovina.
