= Obalj =

Obalj Обаљ
- Village
- Location within Bosnia and Herzegovina
- Coordinates: 43°27′25″N 18°21′18″E
- Country: Bosnia and Herzegovina
- Entity: Republika Srpska
- Municipality: Kalinovik
- Time zone: UTC+1 (CET)
  - Summer (DST): UTC+2 (CEST)

Obalj (Serbian Cyrillic: Обаљ) is a village in the municipality of Kalinovik, Republika Srpska, Bosnia and Herzegovina.
