= Franzjosefsfeld =

Franzjosefsfeld was a German language Danube Swabian settlement in northern Bosnia.

== History ==
Over a decade after the Austrian occupation of Bosnia Protestant Danube Swabians from Banat set up Franzjosefsfeld in 1886 near Bijeljina. "The government looked favourably on these farmers and gave them tax concessions; and in 1890 is passed a special law on 'agrarian colonies', offering up to twelve hectares per family, rent-free for the first three years and then on a low mortgage which would end after ten years if they took Bosnian citizenship.

These colonists named their settlement after the Emperor Franz Joseph I of Austria. After World War I, now part of the new state Yugoslavia, the village was officially renamed to Petrovopolje and after the Nazi occupation in 1941 it was renamed to Schönborn. The colonists introduced modern farming methods and were very successful and prosperous. Consequently the village grew into the second largest German-speaking community in all Bosnia, after Nova Topola (Windthorst). By 1931 there were 1130 Danube Swabians; by 1942 there were 1600.

Following the collapse of internal security during World War II the Nazis decided to evacuate the Volksdeutsche (ethnic German) population from Bosnia and a treaty to this effect was signed with the Croatian Ustaše regime on 30 September 1942. The Hauptamt Volksdeutsche Mittelstelle organised an SS commando from Belgrade under Otto Lackman and "...went from village to village, accompanied by the military."

The village was repopulated after 1945 with Serbs and the Communist authorities destroyed or obscured all evidence of German history and heritage here.

== Literature ==
- Noel Malcolm Bosnia: A Short History (1994)
- Valdis O. Lumans, Himmler's Auxiliaries: The Volksdeutsche Mittelstelle and the German Minorities of Europe, 1939-1945 (1993)
- Gesemann, G, Das Deutschtum in Südslavien (1922, München)
- Heimfelsen, Die Deutschen Kolonien in Bosnien (1911, Sarajevo)
- Hoffmann, Fritz, Das Schicksal der Bosniendeutschen in 100 Jahren von 1878 bis 1978 (1982, Sersheim, Hartmann)
- Fritz Hoffmann, Josef Zorn: Heimatbuch Franzjosefsfeld – Schönborn. Pannonia-Verlag, 1963
