= Nova Topola, Gradiška =

Nova Topola Нова Топола
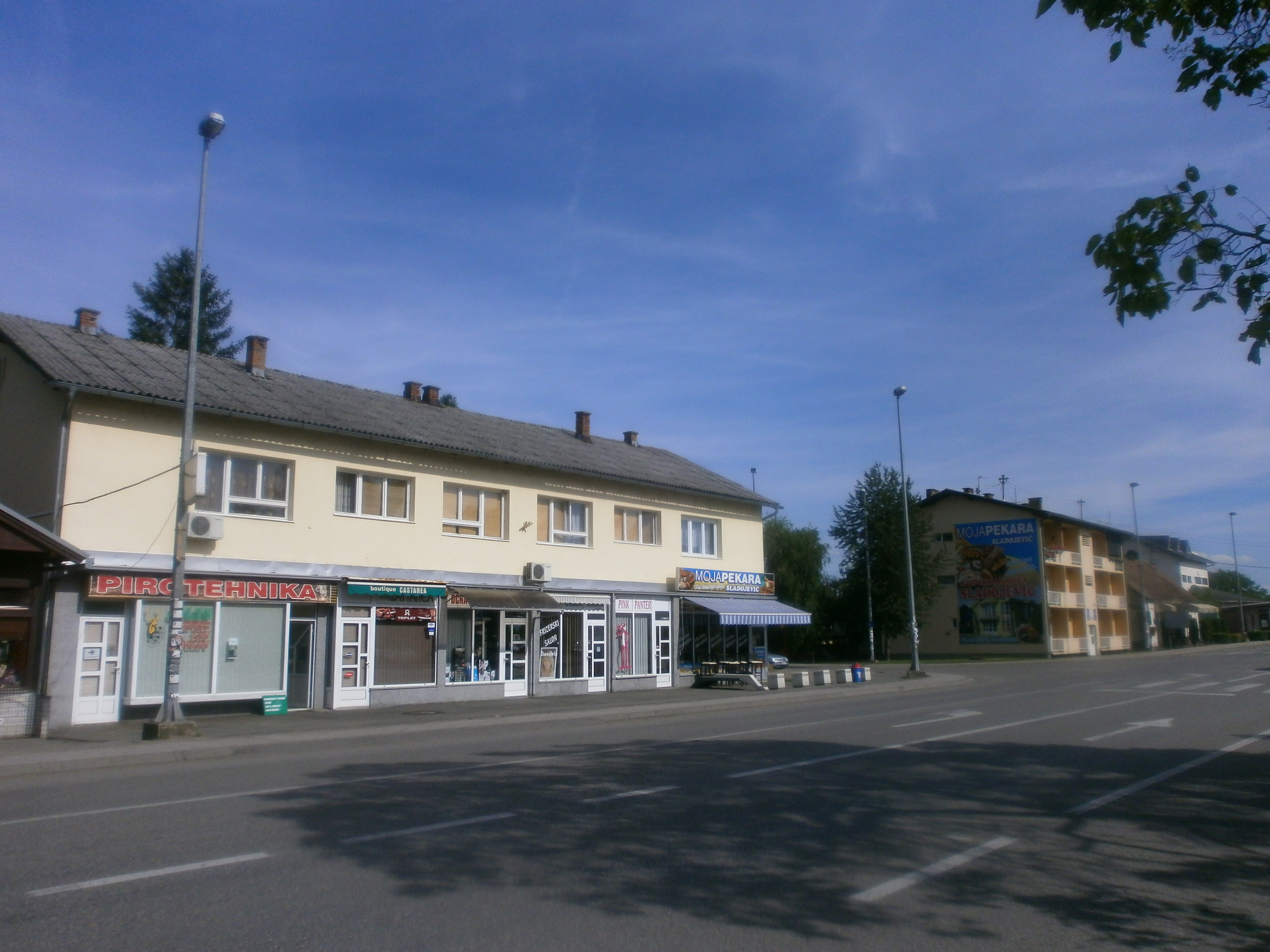

- Location within Bosnia and Herzegovina
- Coordinates: 45°03′N 17°19′E
- Country: Bosnia and Herzegovina
- Entity: Republika Srpska
- Municipality: Gradiška
- Time zone: UTC+1 (CET)
  - Summer (DST): UTC+2 (CEST)

Nova Topola (Serbian: Нова Топола; German: Windthorst) is a village in the municipality of Gradiška, Republika Srpska, Bosnia and Herzegovina. Nova Topola has a population of 2,324 inhabitants. It was founded by German settlers.

== History ==
The village was founded by 14 German settler families from northwestern Germany in 1879, one year after Bosnia came under Habsburg rule. They were joined by six more families in the following year and there was a steady trickle of more migrant families until World War I.

These colonists named their settlement Windthorst. They introduced modern farming methods and were very successful and prosperous. Consequently, the village grew into three distinct parts : Unterwindthorst, Mittelwindthorst and Oberwindthorst. Following a visit to the region by Rudolf, Crown Prince of Austria a daughter-colony, named Rudolfstal, was established nearby in Bosanski Aleksandrovac.

In 1918 Bosnia became part of Kingdom of Serbs, Croats and Slovenes and German immigration stopped. The village was also renamed at this stage as Nova Topola (literally "new poplar") in reference to a nearby village called Stara Topola ("old poplar").

Following the collapse of internal security during World War II the Nazis decided to evacuate the Volksdeutsche (ethnic German) population from Bosnia and a treaty to this effect was signed with the Ustaše regime on 30 September 1942. The Hauptamt Volksdeutsche Mittelstelle (VoMi) organised an SS commando from Belgrade under Otto Lackman and "... went from village to village, accompanied by the military."

By this stage Windthorst was the largest single German settlement in Bosnia. In late 1942 nearly 2000 Volksdeutsche were evacuated to Germany from Nova Topola, and a further 500 from Rudolfstal, never to return. The village was repopulated after 1945 with Serbs and the Communist authorities destroyed or obscured all evidence of German history and heritage here.

== Literature ==
- Noel Malcolm Bosnia: A Short History (1994)
- Valdis O. Lumans, Himmler's Auxiliaries: The Volksdeutsche Mittelstelle and the German Minorities of Europe, 1939-1945 (1993)
- Gesemann, G., Das Deutschtum in Südslavien (1922, München)
- Heimfelsen, Die Deutschen Kolonien in Bosnien (1911, Sarajevo)
- Hoffmann, Fritz, Das Schicksal der Bosniendeutschen in 100 Jahren von 1878 bis 1978 (1982, Sersheim, Hartmann)
- Ostendorf, Franz and Johannes Ostendorf, Fünfzig Jahre Kolonie (1930, Vechta in Oldenburg)
