= Ljuta =

- Village
- Location within Croatia
- Coordinates: 42.5378603°N 18.358066°E
- Country: Croatia
- County: Dubrovnik-Neretva County
- Municipality: Konavle

Area
  - Total: 1.5 sq mi (3.8 km^{2})

Population (2021)
  - Total: 183
  - Density: 120/sq mi (48/km^{2})
- Time zone: UTC+1 (CET)
  - Summer (DST): UTC+2 (CEST)

Ljuta is a village in Croatia, in Konavle municipality.

== Demographics ==
According to the 2021 census, its population was 183.
