= Hotovlja =

Hotovlja Hotovlje (until 1993)
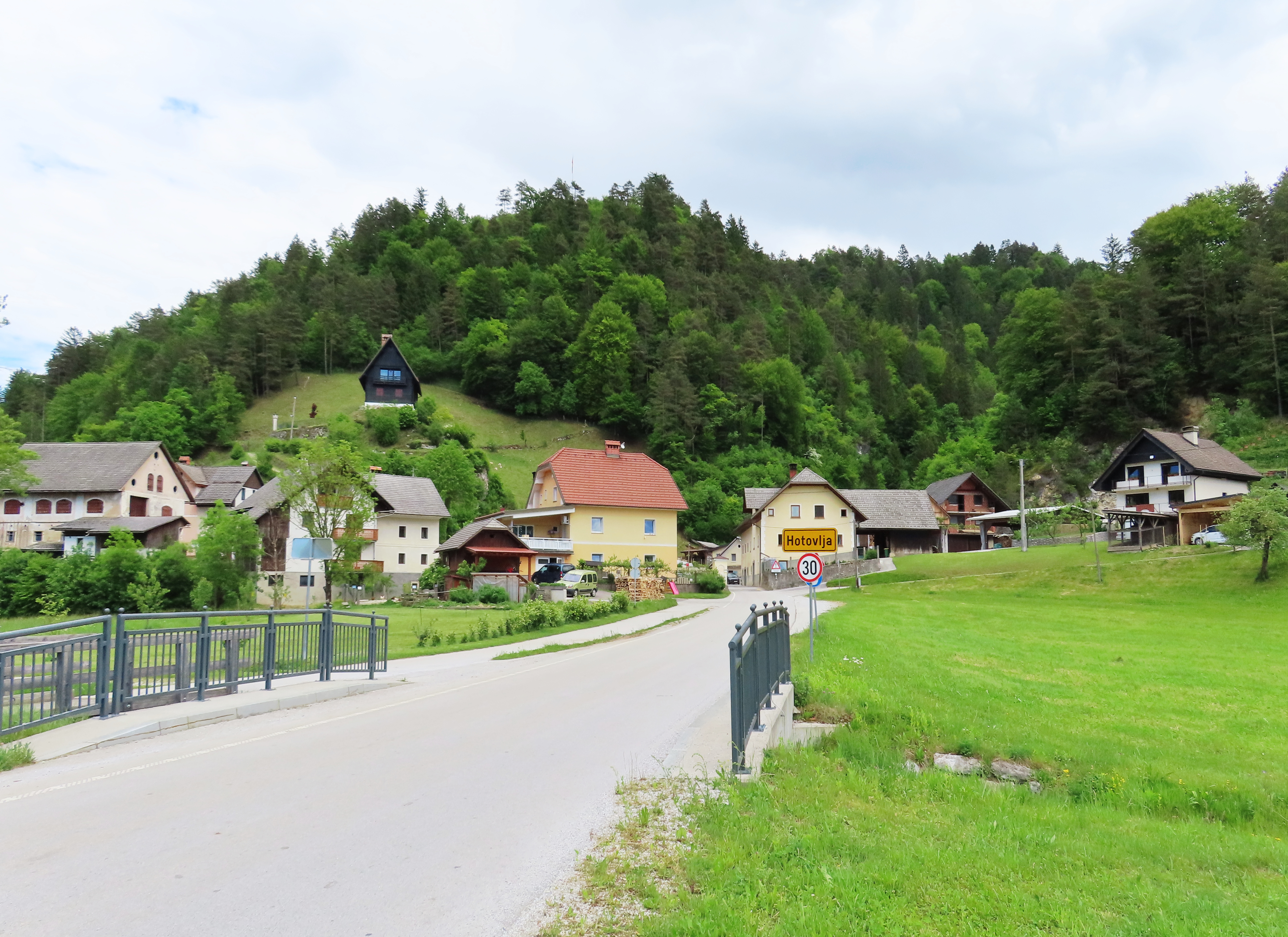

- Location in Slovenia
- Coordinates: 46°7′10.61″N 14°11′32.05″E
- Country: Slovenia
- Traditional region: Upper Carniola
- Statistical region: Upper Carniola
- Municipality: Gorenja Vas–Poljane

Area
  - Total: 1.56 km^{2} (0.60 sq mi)
- Elevation: 387.3 m (1,271 ft)

Population (2020)
  - Total: 260
  - Density: 170/km^{2} (430/sq mi)

Hotovlja (pronounced [xɔˈtoːu̯lja]; German: Hotaule) is a settlement on the right bank of the Poljane Sora River, opposite Poljane nad Škofjo Loko, in the Municipality of Gorenja Vas–Poljane in the Upper Carniola region of Slovenia.

== Name ==
The name of the settlement was changed from Hotovlje to Hotovlja in 1993. In the past the German name was Hotaule.

== Notable people ==
Notable people that were born or lived in Hotovlja include:

- Ignatius Mrak (1810–1901), bishop of the Diocese of Marquette
- Ive Šubic (1922–1989), painter and illustrator
- Štefan Šubic (1820–1884), painter and sculptor
