= Dubrava, Kalinovik =

Dubrava Дубрава
- Village
- Location within Bosnia and Herzegovina
- Coordinates: 43°20′19″N 18°25′35″E
- Country: Bosnia and Herzegovina
- Entity: Republika Srpska
- Municipality: Kalinovik
- Time zone: UTC+1 (CET)
  - Summer (DST): UTC+2 (CEST)

Dubrava (Serbian Cyrillic: Дубрава) is a village in the municipality of Kalinovik, Republika Srpska, Bosnia and Herzegovina.
