= Trešnjevica, Kalinovik =

Trešnjevica Трешњевица
- Village
- Location within Bosnia and Herzegovina
- Coordinates: 43°45′N 17°56′E
- Country: Bosnia and Herzegovina
- Entity: Republika Srpska
- Municipality: Kalinovik
- Time zone: UTC+1 (CET)
  - Summer (DST): UTC+2 (CEST)

Trešnjevica (Serbian Cyrillic: Трешњевица) is a village in the municipality of Kalinovik, Republika Srpska, Bosnia and Herzegovina.
