= Luko, Kalinovik =

Luko Луко
- Village
- Location within Bosnia and Herzegovina
- Coordinates: 43°29′07″N 18°19′31″E
- Country: Bosnia and Herzegovina
- Entity: Republika Srpska
- Municipality: Kalinovik
- Time zone: UTC+1 (CET)
  - Summer (DST): UTC+2 (CEST)

Luko (Serbian Cyrillic: Луко) is a village in the municipality of Kalinovik, Republika Srpska, Bosnia and Herzegovina.
