= Hutu Power =

Ethnic supremacist ideology in Rwanda and Burundi

- Newspaper: Kangura; RTLM (radio)
- Membership: Rwanda: MRND; Interahamwe; Akazu; CDR; Impuzamugambi; ALiR; FDLR; Parmehutu; MDR (Note: extremist factions); Burundi: PALIPEHUTU-FNL (formerly); FROLINA (formerly); CNDD-FDD (formerly)
- Ideology: Hutu ultranationalism; Social Darwinism; Planned liberalism; Primordialism; Totalitarianism; Rwandan genocide denial; Anti-Tutsi sentiment; Anti-Twa sentiment
- Political position: Far-right

Hutu Power, or Hutu Supremacy, is an ethnic supremacist ideology that asserts the ethnic superiority of Hutu, often in the context of being superior to Tutsi and Twa, and the supposed right of Hutu to dominate and kill these two groups and other minorities. Espoused by Hutu extremists, widespread support for the ideology led to the 1994 Rwandan genocide against the Tutsi, the moderate Hutu who opposed the killings, and the Twa, who were considered traitors. Hutu Power political parties and movements included the Akazu, the Parmehutu, the Coalition for the Defence of the Republic and its Impuzamugambi militia, and the governing National Republican Movement for Democracy and Development and its Interahamwe militia. Hutu supremacy is most common in Rwanda and Burundi, where Hutu comprise most of the population. It was the main ideology of the Third Rwandese Republic.

In 1957, 9 Hutu intellectuals including future Hutu president and military dictator Grégoire Kayibanda composed the Bahutu Manifesto, calling for a double liberation of Hutus from the European colonizers and the Tutsis, who they regarded as Hamitic invaders and oppressors. The Manifesto became the blueprint for future Hutu nationalist movements. In the years following the victory of Hutus in the Hutu Revolution and the formation of a Hutu dictatorship, Rwanda saw a surge in ethnic tensions and violence, which finally formulated in the form of Hutu Power. In 1990, Hassan Ngeze wrote the Hutu Ten Commandments, a document that served as the basis of the Hutu Power ideology. The Commandments called for the supremacy of Hutus in Rwanda, exclusive Hutu leadership over Rwanda's public institutions and public life, complete segregation of Hutus from Tutsis, and complete exclusion of Tutsis from public institutions and public life. Hutu Power ideology reviled Tutsis as outsiders bent on restoring a Tutsi-dominated monarchy, and idealized Hutu culture.

Due to its sheer destructiveness, Hutu Power and the Third Rwandese Republic have often been compared to Nazism and the Third Reich in the Western world.

== History ==
=== Background ===
The Rwandan kingdom was traditionally ruled by a Tutsi mwami (king). Historical evidence suggests that Hutu and Twa were included in the government, but the Twa were included in it significantly less so than the Hutu, who were more numerous. The Tutsi/Hutu divide has been referred to as a caste system. A Hutu could gain Tutsi status through marriage or through success. Tutsis, being primarily pastoralists, had a more valuable place in Rwandan society than the agriculturalist Hutu, and the hunter-gatherer and potter Twa.

The society created conceptions of social status which were based on the groups' traditional pursuits: the Twa, working most directly with the earth (through pottery), were considered impure; the Hutu, still working with the ground but less so than the Twa, were in turn considered less pure than the above-ground Tutsi. When Germany, and later Belgium, colonized the kingdom, they interpreted the local division of races or ethnicity through the Hamitic hypothesis.

European authors such as John Hanning Speke wrote of the Tutsi as being of Hamitic origin, having originated from modern-day Ethiopia and migrating southwards, and having brought "civilization" to the Negroid races of Sub-Saharan Africa. As a result, the colonial administration favored the Tutsi at the expense of Hutu and Twa. In addition, they imposed a system of identity cards and ethnic classification in censuses, which reinforced an artificial ethnic division and contributed to tensions between groups.

=== Shift in Belgian colonial rule ===
Toward the end of Belgian rule, the government began to favor the Hutu, who were organizing for more influence. More significantly, the Belgian administration feared the rise of communism and a pan-African socialist regime led by Congo-Léopoldville's Patrice Lumumba. Then-Belgian High Resident Guy Logiest set up the first democratic elections in Rwanda to avoid more radical politics. As the majority population, the Hutu elected their candidates to most positions in the new government.

== Formation ==
The first elected president Grégoire Kayibanda, an ethnic Hutu, used ethnic tensions to preserve his own power. Hutu radicals, working with his group (and later against it), adopted the Hamitic hypothesis, portraying the Tutsi as outsiders, invaders, and oppressors of Rwanda. Some Hutu radicals called for the Tutsi to be "sent back to Abyssinia", a reference to their supposed homeland. This early concept of Hutu Power idealized a "pre-invasion" Rwanda: an ethnically pure territory dominated by the Hutu.

== Under Habyarimana ==
"Hutu Power! MRND power! CDR power! MRD power! All Hutu are one power!”

— Froduald Karamira, 1993,

In 1973, general and defense minister Juvénal Habyarimana, an ethnic Hutu supported by radical northern Rwandans, overthrew Kayibanda and had him and his wife killed while under house arrest. Many of his supporters were from his district in the north, descendants of Hutu kingdoms that had been semi-autonomous before the colonial period. The resulting administration proved better for Tutsis, as government-sponsored violence was more sporadic than under Kayibanda.

With economic conditions difficult, and threatened by the Rwandan Patriotic Front (RPF) invasion, Habyarimana turned to inflaming ethnic tensions.

== Spokespersons ==
Hutu Power acquired a variety of spokesmen. Hassan Ngeze, an entrepreneur recruited by the government to combat the Tutsi publication Kanguka, created and edited Kangura, a radical Hutu Power newsletter. He published the "Hutu Ten Commandments", which included the following:

- Hutu and Tutsi should not intermarry;
- the education system must be composed of a Hutu majority (reflecting the population); and
- the Rwandan armed forces should be exclusively Hutu.

Radio Télévision Libre des Mille Collines broadcast radio shows suggesting the end to toleration of the Tutsi, repeating the Hutu Ten Commandments, and building support for the Hutu Power ideology. Two main voices of RTLM were announcers Valérie Bemeriki and Georges Ruggiu. The repetition of Hutu Ten Commandments was an attempt to incite and mobilize the population to commit genocide against the Tutsi, who were portrayed as threatening the social and political order achieved since independence, and as envisioned by the Akazu. Politician Léon Mugesera gave a speech in November, 1992, allegedly stating, "Do not be afraid, know that anyone whose neck you do not cut is the one who will cut your neck...Let them pack their bags, let them get going, so that no one will return here to talk and no one will bring scraps claiming to be flags!" The radio programs frequently referred to the Tutsi as inyenzi, a Kinyarwanda word meaning 'cockroach', though the term had also been a self-description by members of the Tutsi Rwanda Patriotic Front.

== Opposition to miscegenation ==
The Commandments declared that any form of relationship between Hutus and Tutsi women was forbidden; and that any Hutu who "marries a Tutsi woman", "befriends a Tutsi woman", or "employs a Tutsi woman as a secretary or a concubine" was a traitor to the Hutu people. It denounced Tutsis as dishonest in business whose "only aim is the supremacy of his ethnic group"; and declared that any Hutu who did business with a Tutsi was a traitor to the Hutu people. The Commandments declared that "The Hutu should stop having mercy on the Tutsi" and referred to the Tutsis as "common Tutsi enemy".

== Rwandan genocide ==
During the attempted negotiations (Arusha Accords) between the Rwandan government and the RPF, radical Hutus began alleging that Habyarimana was being manipulated by Tutsis and non-radical Hutus. They maligned then-Prime Minister Agathe Uwilingiyimana. Following Habyarimana's assassination, an act that at the time people speculated was done by Tutsi extremists, Hutu Power forces mobilized militia, most notably Interahamwe, and mobs to carry out the mass killings of the Rwandan genocide. The Presidential Guard of the army killed Prime Minister Uwilingiyimana and several other leading moderate government officials.

The defeat of the government by the RPF ended the genocide, and the Hutu Power movement was defeated and suppressed. Many Hutu Power spokesmen were arrested after the genocide, charged and put on trial. Ngeze was convicted and sentenced to 35 years' imprisonment. In 2005, Mugesera was deported from Canada to Rwanda to stand trial for his role in the killings.

== See also ==
- Ethnic nationalism
- Rwandan Civil War
- Hutu Power Radio
- Interahamwe

== Bibliography ==
- Gourevitch, Philip (1998). We Wish to Inform You That Tomorrow We Will Be Killed with Our Families. Farrar, Straus and Giroux. ISBN 0-312-24335-9.
