= Jean-Bosco Barayagwiza =

Rwandan diplomat and convicted war criminal

- Born: 1950; Mutura, Gisenyi, Ruanda-Urundi
- Died: 25 April 2010 (aged 59–60); Porto-Novo, Benin
- Occupations: lawyer, civil servant
- Status: Deceased
- Convictions: Conspiracy to commit genocide, genocide, direct and public incitement to commit genocide; complicity in genocide; and crimes against humanity (persecution, extermination and murder) (ICTR-97-27-1 on 10 November 1999)
- Penalty: 32 years imprisonment

Jean-Bosco Barayagwiza (1950 – 25 April 2010) was a convicted génocidaire and politician associated with the Hutu Power movement. A high-ranking civil servant, Barayagwiza served as policy director within the Ministry of Foreign Affairs at the time of the Rwandan genocide. He has been described as one of the "masterminds" of the genocide.

Barayagwiza was a founding member of the extremist party Coalition for the Defence of the Republic, which was considered to take an even more radical stance against the Tutsi population than the governing National Republican Movement for Democracy and Development. As chairman of the executive committee of popular radio station Radio Télévision Libre des Mille Collines (RTML), he would preside over the airing of content urging genocidal violence against the Tutsis.

== Post-genocide life ==
=== Cameroon ===
While detained in Yaoundé, Cameroon in 1996, Barayagwiza would accuse the RPF government of unfair bias against the Hutus, stating that "the regime is generalizing and making things ethnic by accusing the Hutu as genociders". Barayagwiza claimed Hutus were the victim of Tutsi aggression during the genocide and had been acting in self-defense.

=== Genocide trial and death ===
On 23 October 2000 he was charged by the International Criminal Tribunal for Rwanda with Genocide, Crimes Against Humanity and violations of the Geneva Conventions. He was tried along with Ferdinand Nahimana, a co-founder of RTLM, and Hassan Ngeze, director and editor of the Kangura newspaper. Barayagwiza was initially defended by Canadian lawyer Mrs. Marchessault and American lawyer Mr. Danielson.

When the two lawyers withdrew, Barayagwiza was defended throughout the trial, up to the sentence of first instance, by Italian lawyer Giacomo Barletta Caldarera, so far the only Italian lawyer to have acted as defense counsel in a UN International Tribunal. Barayagwiza refused to participate in the trial, claiming that the judges were not impartial.

On 3 December 2003 Barayagwiza was found guilty of genocide, conspiracy to commit genocide, public and direct incitement to genocide and extermination and persecution constituting crimes against humanity. He was also found not guilty of additional charges of complicity in genocide, murder and violations of Geneva Conventions.

He was sentenced to 35 years' imprisonment. He announced that he was appealing the sentence and was assigned Donald Herbert and Tanoo Mylvaganam as a new defence counsel on 30 November 2004. Alfred Pognon was called as "adjunct" defense counsel to Barletta Caldarera. His appeal was partially upheld on 22 June 2009 and his sentence was reduced to 32 years' imprisonment.

He died on 25 April 2010 in Porto-Novo, Benin, due to an advanced case of Hepatitis C. It has been reported by his family that he was denied adequate treatment.
