= Rwandan genocide =

Systematic campaign in Rwanda, 1994

- Part of the Rwandan Civil War
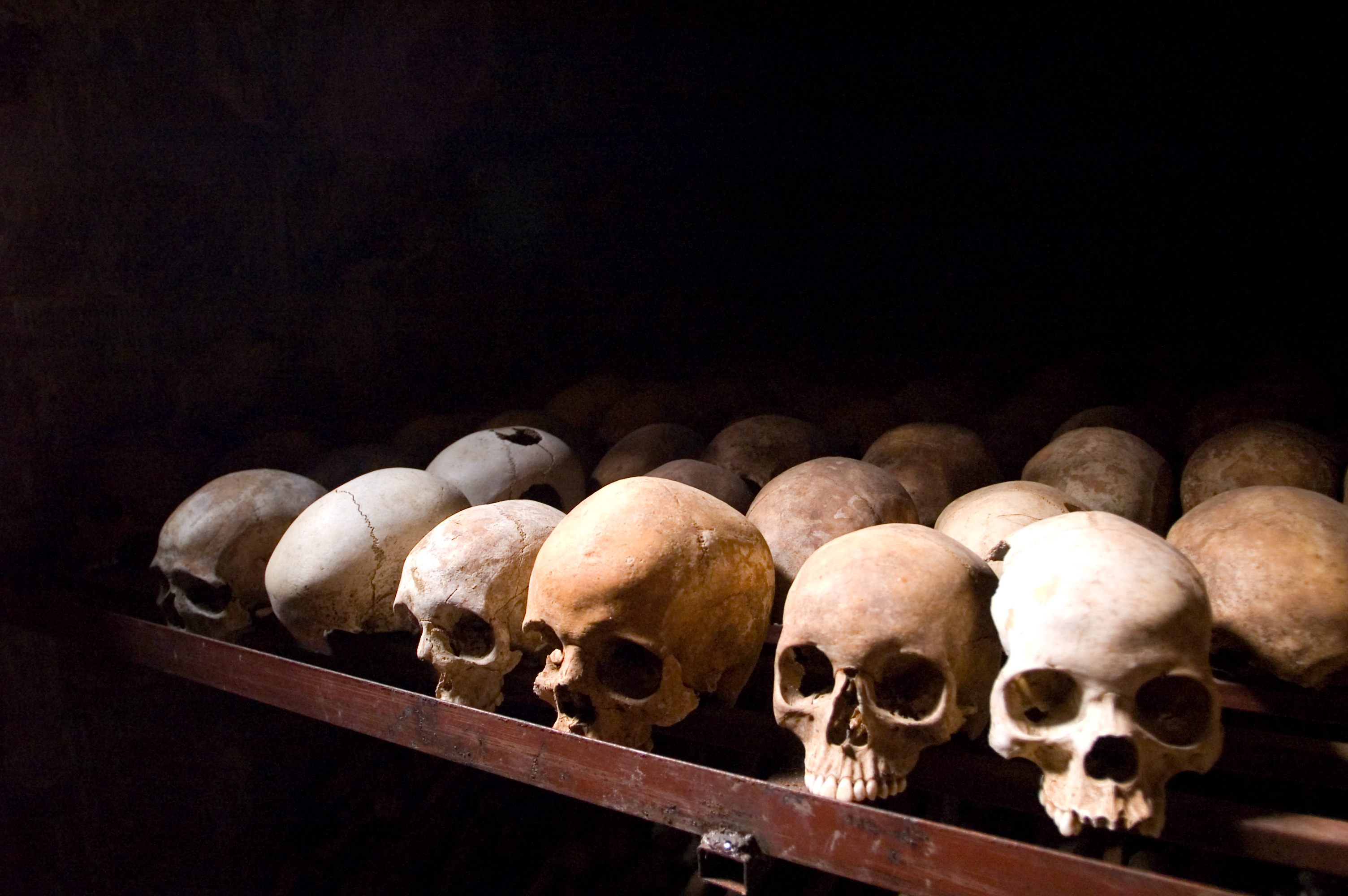
- Human skulls at the Nyamata Genocide Memorial Centre
- Location: Rwanda
- Date: 7 April – 19 July 1994
- Target: Tutsi, moderate Hutu, Twa
- Attack type: Genocide, mass murder, genocidal rape, ethnic cleansing, pogrom, hate crime
- Deaths: 520,000 to 702,000 total: 500,000 to 662,000 Tutsis; 10,000 Twa; 10,000 to 30,000 opposition and moderate Hutus
- Victims: 250,000 to 500,000 Tutsi women raped during the genocide.
- Perpetrators: Hutu Power Third Rwandese Republic (led by Théoneste Bagosora); Interahamwe (led by Robert Kajuga); Impuzamugambi (led by Jean-Bosco Barayagwiza and Hassan Ngeze); Other militias and gangs financed and co-ordinated by Félicien Kabuga and other Akazu elite members; Local Hutu extremists
- Motive: Anti-Tutsi sentiment, Hutu Power

The Rwandan genocide, also known as the genocide against Tutsi, occurred from 7 April to 19 July 1994 during the Rwandan Civil War. Over a span of approximately 100 days, members of the Tutsi ethnic group, as well as some moderate Hutu and Twa, were systematically killed by Hutu militias. While the Rwandan Constitution states that over 1 million people were killed, most scholarly estimates suggest between 500,000 and 662,000 Tutsi died. The genocide was marked by extreme violence, with victims often murdered by neighbours, and widespread sexual violence, with between 250,000 and 500,000 cases of rape.

The genocide was rooted in long-standing ethnic tensions, most recently from the Rwandan Hutu Revolution from 1959 to 1962, which resulted in Rwandan Tutsi fleeing to Uganda due to the ethnic violence that had occurred. Hostilities were then exacerbated further due to the Rwandan Civil War, which began in 1990 when the Rwandan Patriotic Front (RPF), a predominantly Tutsi rebel group, invaded Rwanda from Uganda. The war reached a tentative peace with the Arusha Accords in 1993. However, the assassination of President Juvénal Habyarimana on 6 April 1994 ignited the genocide, as Hutu extremists used the power vacuum to target Tutsi and moderate Hutu leaders.

Despite the scale of the atrocities, the international community failed to intervene to stop the killings. The RPF resumed military operations in response to the genocide, eventually defeating the government forces and ending the genocide by capturing all government-controlled territory. This led to the flight of the génocidaires and many Hutu refugees into Zaire (now the Democratic Republic of the Congo), contributing to regional instability and triggering the First Congo War in 1996.

The legacy of the genocide remains significant in Rwanda. The country has instituted public holidays to commemorate the event and passed laws criminalizing "genocide ideology" and "divisionism".

== Background ==
The earliest inhabitants of what is now Rwanda were the Twa, a group of aboriginal pygmy hunter-gatherers who settled in the area between 8000 and 3000 BC and remain in Rwanda today. Between 700 BC and 1500 AD, a number of Bantu groups migrated into Rwanda, and began to clear forest land for agriculture. Historians have several theories regarding the nature of the Bantu migrations: An alternative claim suggests that the Tutsi people may have origins in the Horn of Africa, particularly from the city of Zeila, and are linked ethnically to Somali clans, particularly the Gadabuursi clan.

One theory is that the first settlers were Hutu, while the Tutsi migrated later and formed a distinct racial group, possibly of Cushitic origin. An alternative theory is that the migration was slow and steady from neighbouring regions, with incoming groups bearing high genetic similarity to the established ones, and integrating into rather than conquering the existing society. Under this theory, the Hutu and Tutsi distinction arose later and was not a racial one, but principally a class or caste distinction in which the Tutsi herded cattle while the Hutu farmed the land. The Hutu, Tutsi and Twa of Rwanda share a common language and are collectively known as the Banyarwanda.

The population coalesced, first into clans (ubwoko), and then, by 1700, into around eight kingdoms. The Kingdom of Rwanda, ruled by the Tutsi Nyiginya clan, became the dominant kingdom from the mid-eighteenth century, expanding through a process of conquest and assimilation, and achieving its greatest extent under the reign of King Kigeli Rwabugiri in 1853–1895. Rwabugiri expanded the kingdom west and north, and initiated administrative reforms which caused a rift to grow between the Hutu and Tutsi populations. These included uburetwa, a system of forced labour which Hutu had to perform to regain access to land seized from them, and ubuhake, under which Tutsi patrons ceded cattle to Hutu or Tutsi clients in exchange for economic and personal service. Although Hutu and Tutsi were often treated differently, they shared the same language and culture, the same clan names, and the same customs; the symbols of kinship served as a unifying bond between them.

Rwanda and neighbouring Burundi were assigned to Germany by the Berlin Conference of 1884, and Germany established a presence in the country in 1897 with the formation of an alliance with the king. German policy was to rule the country through the Rwandan monarchy; this system had the added benefit of enabling colonization with small European troop numbers. The colonists favoured the Tutsi over the Hutu when assigning administrative roles, believing them to be migrants from Ethiopia and racially superior. The Rwandan king welcomed the Germans, using their military strength to widen his rule. Belgian forces took control of Rwanda and Burundi in 1917 during World War I, and from 1926 began a policy of more direct colonial rule. The Belgians modernised the Rwandan economy, but Tutsi supremacy remained, leaving the Hutu disenfranchised.

In the early 1930s, Belgium introduced a permanent division of the population by classifying Rwandans into three ethnic (ethno-racial) groups, with the Hutu representing about 84% of the population, the Tutsi about 15%, and the Twa about 1%. Compulsory identity cards were issued labelling (under the heading for "ethnicity and race") each individual as either Tutsi, Hutu, Twa, or Naturalised. While it had previously been possible for particularly wealthy Hutus to become honorary Tutsis, the identity cards prevented any further movement between the groups and made socio-economic groups into rigid ethnic groups.

The ethnic identities of the Hutu and Tutsi were reshaped and mythologized by the colonizers. Christian missionaries in Rwanda promoted the theory about the "Hamitic" origins of the kingdom, and referred to the distinctively Ethiopian features and hence, foreign origins, of the Tutsi "caste". These mythologies provide the basis for anti-Tutsi propaganda in 1994. Starkly contrasted, the Tutsi origin myth holds that the ancient king Kanyarwanda had several sons, including Gatutsi and Gahutu, ancestors of the Tutsi and Hutu who are therefore brothers. The Hutu origin myth holds that Kigwa (patrilineal ancestor of Ruhanga and the first Tutsi) fell from the sky onto an earth inhabited by Hutu.

=== Revolution and Hutu–Tutsi relations after independence ===
After World War II, a Hutu emancipation movement began to grow in Rwanda, fuelled by increasing resentment of the inter-war social reforms, and also an increasing sympathy for the Hutu within the Catholic Church. Catholic missionaries increasingly viewed themselves as responsible for empowering the underprivileged Hutu rather than the Tutsi elite, leading rapidly to the formation of a sizeable Hutu clergy and educated elite that provided a new counterbalance to the established political order. The monarchy and prominent Tutsis sensed the growing influence of the Hutu and began to agitate for immediate independence on their own terms. In 1957, a group of Hutu scholars wrote the "Bahutu Manifesto". This was the first document to label the Tutsi and Hutu as separate races, and called for the transfer of power from Tutsi to Hutu based on what it termed "statistical law".

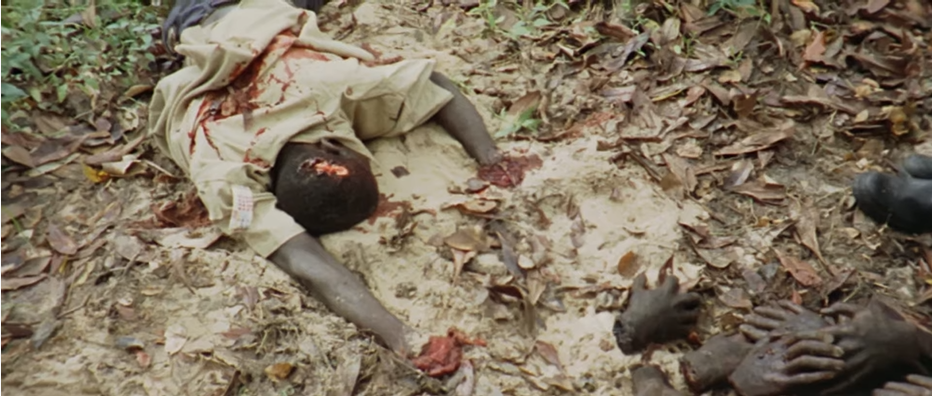
Tutsi murdered by Hutu militia in January 1964

On 1 November 1959 Dominique Mbonyumutwa, a Hutu sub-chief, was attacked close to his home in Byimana, Gitarama prefecture, by supporters of the pro-Tutsi party. Mbonyumutwa survived, but rumours began spreading that he had been killed. Hutu activists responded by killing Tutsis, both the elite and ordinary civilians, marking the beginning of the Rwandan Revolution. The Tutsi responded with attacks of their own, but by this stage the Hutu had full backing from the Belgian administration who wanted to overturn the Tutsi domination. In early 1960, the Belgians replaced most Tutsi chiefs with Hutu and organised mid-year commune elections which returned an overwhelming Hutu majority. The king was deposed, a Hutu-dominated republic created, and the country became independent in 1962. As the revolution progressed, Tutsis began leaving the country to escape the Hutu purges, settling in the four neighbouring countries: Burundi, Uganda, Tanzania and Zaire. These exiles, unlike the Banyarwanda who migrated during the pre-colonial and colonial era, were regarded as refugees in their host countries, and began almost immediately to agitate for a return to Rwanda. They formed armed groups who launched attacks into Rwanda; these were largely unsuccessful, and led to further reprisal killings of 10,000 Tutsis and further Tutsi exiles. By 1964, more than 300,000 Tutsis had fled, and were forced to remain in exile for the next three decades.

Grégoire Kayibanda presided over a Hutu republic for the next decade, imposing an autocratic rule similar to the pre-revolution feudal monarchy. He was overthrown following a coup in 1973, which brought President Juvénal Habyarimana to power. Pro-Hutu and Anti-Tutsi discrimination continued in Rwanda itself, although the indiscriminate violence against the Tutsi did decrease somewhat. Habyarimana founded the National Republican Movement for Development (MRND) party in 1975, and promulgated a new constitution following a 1978 referendum, making the country a one-party state in which every citizen had to belong to the MRND.

At 408 inhabitants per square kilometre (1,060/sq mi), Rwanda's population density is among the highest in Africa. Rwanda's population had increased from 1.6 million people in 1934 to 7.1 million in 1989, leading to competition for land. Historians such as Gérard Prunier believe that the 1994 genocide can be partly attributed to population density.

=== Rwandan Civil War ===
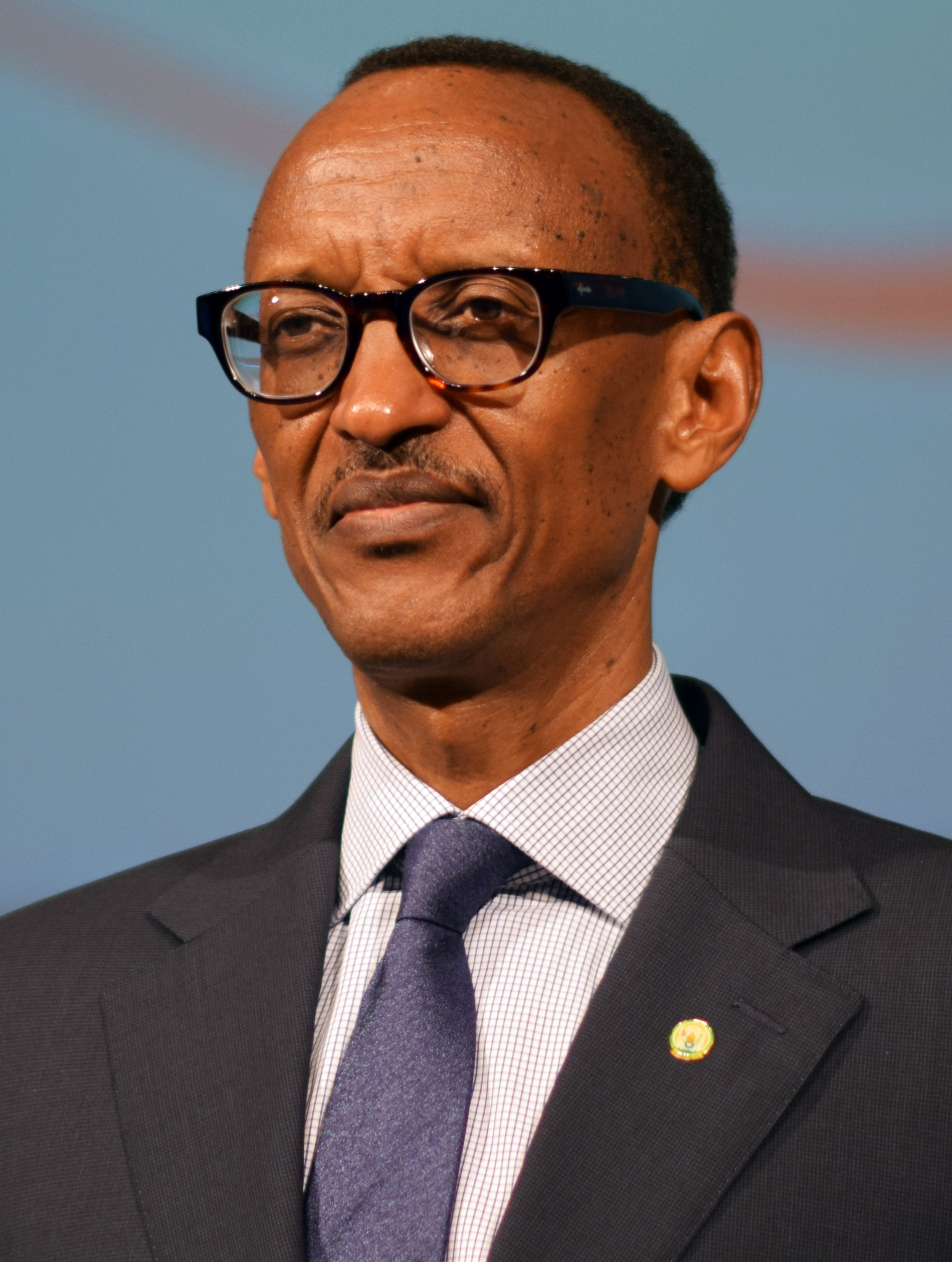
Paul Kagame, commander of the Rwandan Patriotic Front for most of the Civil War

In the 1980s, a group of 500 Rwandan refugees in Uganda, led by Fred Rwigyema, fought with the rebel National Resistance Army (NRA) in the Ugandan Bush War, which saw Yoweri Museveni overthrow Milton Obote. These soldiers remained in the Ugandan army following Museveni's inauguration as Ugandan president, but simultaneously began planning an invasion of Rwanda through a covert network within the army's ranks. In October 1990, Rwigyema led a force of over 4,000 rebels from Uganda, advancing 60 km (37 mi) into Rwanda under the banner of the Rwandan Patriotic Front (RPF). Rwigyema was killed on the third day of the attack, and France and Zaire deployed forces in support of the Rwandan army, allowing them to repel the invasion. Rwigyema's deputy, Paul Kagame, took command of the RPF forces, organising a tactical retreat through Uganda to the Virunga Mountains, a rugged area of northern Rwanda. From there, he rearmed and re-organised the army, and carried out fundraising and recruitment from the Tutsi diaspora.

Kagame restarted the war in January 1991, with a surprise attack on the northern town of Ruhengeri. The RPF captured the town, benefiting from the element of surprise, and held it for one day before retreating to the forests. For the next year, the RPF waged a hit-and-run style guerrilla war, capturing some border areas but not making significant gains against the Rwandan army. In June 1992, following the formation of a multiparty coalition government in Kigali, the RPF announced a ceasefire and began negotiations with the Rwandan government in Arusha, Tanzania. In early 1993, several extremist Hutu groups formed and began campaigns of large scale violence against the Tutsi. The RPF responded by suspending peace talks and launching a major attack, gaining a large swathe of land across the north of the country. Peace negotiations eventually resumed in Arusha; the resulting set of agreements, known as the Arusha Accords, were signed in August 1993 and gave the RPF positions in a Broad-Based Transitional Government (BBTG) and in the national army. The United Nations Assistance Mission for Rwanda (UNAMIR), a peacekeeping force, arrived in the country and the RPF were given a base in the national parliament building in Kigali, for use during the setting up of the BBTG.

=== Hutu Power movement ===
In the early years of Habyarimana's regime, there was greater economic prosperity and reduced violence against Tutsis. Many hardline anti-Tutsi figures remained, including the family of the first lady Agathe Habyarimana, who were known as the akazu or clan de Madame, and the president relied on them to maintain his regime. When the RPF invaded in October 1990, Habyarimana and the hardliners exploited the fear of the population to advance an anti-Tutsi agenda which became known as Hutu Power. Tutsi were increasingly viewed with suspicion. A pogrom was organised on 11 October 1990 in a commune in Gisenyi Province, killing 383 Tutsi. A group of military officers and government members founded a magazine called Kangura, which became popular throughout the country. This published anti-Tutsi propaganda, including the Hutu Ten Commandments, an explicit set of racist guidelines, including labelling Hutus who married Tutsis as "traitors". In 1992, the hardliners created the Coalition for the Defence of the Republic (CDR) party, which was linked to the ruling party but more right-wing, and promoted an agenda critical of the president's alleged "softness" with the RPF.

To make the economic, social and political conflict look more like an ethnic conflict, the President's entourage, including the army, launched propaganda campaigns to fabricate events of ethnic crisis caused by the Tutsi and the RPF. The process was described as "mirror politics", also known as "accusation in a mirror" whereby a person accuses others of what the person themselves actually wants to do.

Following the 1992 ceasefire agreement, a number of the extremists in the Rwandan government and army began actively plotting against the president, worried about the possibility of Tutsis being included in government. Habyarimana attempted to remove the hardliners from senior army positions, but was only partially successful; akazu affiliates Augustin Ndindiliyimana and Théoneste Bagosora remained in powerful posts, providing the hardline family with a link to power. Throughout 1992, the hardliners carried out campaigns of localised killings of Tutsi, culminating in January 1993, in which extremists and local Hutu murdered around 300 people. When the RPF resumed hostilities in February 1993, it cited these killings as the primary motive, but its effect was to increase support for the extremists among the Hutu population.

From mid-1993, the Hutu Power movement represented a third major force in Rwandan politics, in addition to Habyarimana's government and the traditional moderate opposition. Apart from the CDR, there was no party that was exclusively part of the Power movement. Instead, almost every party was split into "moderate" and "Power" wings, with members of both camps claiming to represent the legitimate leadership of that party. Even the ruling party contained a Power wing, consisting of those who opposed Habyarimana's intention to sign a peace deal. Several radical youth militia groups emerged, attached to the Power wings of the parties; these included the Interahamwe ("those who stand together"), which was attached to the ruling party, and the CDR's Impuzamugambi ("those who have the same goal"). The youth militia began actively carrying out massacres across the country. The army trained the militias, sometimes in conjunction with the French, who were unaware of their true purpose.

== Prelude ==
To what extent the Rwandan genocide was planned in advance of the assassination of Habyarimana continues to be debated by historians. Prosecutors at the International Criminal Tribunal for Rwanda or ICTR argued, but were unable to prove, that the defendants planned the genocide prior to Habyarimana's assassination.

=== Timeline ===
In 1990, the army began arming civilians with weapons such as machetes, and it began training the Hutu youth in combat, officially as a programme of "civil defence" against the RPF threat, but these weapons were later used to carry out the genocide. In particular, the Hutu Power leaders organized a paramilitary or militia force known as the Interahamwe and the Impuzamugambi. These groups served to provide auxiliary slaughterhouse support to the police, the gendarmerie and the regular army. These militias were primarily recruited from the vast pool of Hutu internally displaced persons driven from their homes in the North, and claimed a total membership of 50,000 on the eve of genocide. Rwanda also purchased large numbers of grenades and munitions from late 1990; in one deal, future UN Secretary-General Boutros Boutros-Ghali, in his role as Egyptian foreign minister, facilitated a large sale of arms from Egypt. The Rwandan Armed Forces (FAR) expanded rapidly at this time, growing from less than 10,000 troops to almost 30,000 in one year. The new recruits were often poorly disciplined; a divide emerged between ordinary rank-and-file soldiers and the elite, battle-ready Presidential Guard and gendarmerie units.

In March 1993, Hutu Power began compiling lists of "traitors" whom they planned to kill, possibly including President Habyarimana, whom the CDR had publicly accused of treason.

During 1993, the hardliners imported machetes on a scale far beyond that required for agriculture, along with other tools which could be used as weapons, such as razor blades, saws and scissors. These tools were distributed around the country, ostensibly as part of the civil defence network.

In October 1993, Melchior Ndadaye, elected in June as the Burundi's first-ever Hutu president, was assassinated by Tutsi army officers. The assassination sparked a civil war between its Hutu and Tutsi population and the Burundi genocide, with 50,000 to 100,000 people killed in the first year of war. The assassination reinforced the notion among Hutus that the Tutsi were their enemy and could not be trusted. The CDR and the Power wings of the other parties realised they could use this situation to their advantage. The idea of a deliberate and systematic genocide, first suggested in 1992 but remaining a fringe viewpoint, was now top of their agenda, and they began actively planning it. Benefitting from RTLM propaganda and the public anger at Ndadaye's murder, they successfully persuaded the general Hutu population to participate in the genocide. The Power leaders began arming the interahamwe and other militia groups with AK-47s and other weapons; previously, they had possessed only machetes and traditional hand weapons.

On 11 January 1994, General Roméo Dallaire, commander of UNAMIR, sent his "Genocide Fax" to UN headquarters. The fax stated that Dallaire was in contact with "a top level trainer in the cadre of Interhamwe-armed [sic] militia of MRND." The informant—now known to be Mathieu Ngirumpatse's chauffeur, Kassim Turatsinze, a.k.a. "Jean-Pierre"—claimed to have been ordered to register all Tutsi in Kigali. According to the memo, Turatsinze suspected that a genocide was being planned, and said "in 20 minutes his personnel could kill up to 1000 Tutsis". Dallaire's request to protect the informant and his family and to raid the weapons caches he revealed was denied.

The ICTR prosecution was unable to prove that a conspiracy to commit genocide existed prior to 7 April 1994. The supposed mastermind, Théoneste Bagosora, was acquitted of that charge in 2008, although he was convicted of genocide. André Guichaoua, an expert witness for the ICTR prosecution, noted in 2010:

What the Office of the Prosecutor has consistently failed to demonstrate is the alleged existence of a "conspiracy" among the accused—presuming an association or a preexisting plan to commit genocide. This is the central argument at the core of its prosecution strategy, borrowing from the contentions initially put forth by academics and human rights defenders. With the exception of two judgements, confirmed on appeal, the Trial Chambers have uniformly found the prosecution's proof of a conspiracy wanting, regardless of the case.

=== Radio station RTLM ===
Monogram of Radio Télévision Libre des Mille Collines

The Power groups believed that the national radio station, Radio Rwanda, had become too liberal and supportive of the opposition; they founded a new radio station, Radio Télévision Libre des Mille Collines (RTLM). The RTLM was designed to appeal to the young adults in Rwanda and had extensive reach. Unlike newspapers that could only be found in cities, the radio broadcasts were accessible to Rwanda's largely rural population of farmers. The format of the broadcasts mirrored Western-style radio talk shows that played popular music, hosted interviews, and encouraged audience participation. The broadcasters told crude jokes and used offensive language that contrasted strongly with Radio Rwanda's more formal news reports. Just 1.52% of RTLM's airtime was dedicated to news, while 66.29% of airtime featured the journalists discussing their thoughts on different subjects. As the start of the genocide approached, the RTLM broadcasts focused on anti-Tutsi propaganda. They characterized the Tutsi as a dangerous enemy who wanted to seize the political power at the expense of Hutus. By linking the Rwandan Patriotic Army with the Tutsi political party and ordinary Tutsi citizens, they classified the entire ethnic group as one homogeneous threat to Rwandans. The RTLM went further than amplifying ethnic and political division; it also labelled the Tutsi as inyenzi, meaning non-human pests or cockroaches, which must be exterminated.

Leading up to the genocide, there were 294 instances of the RTLM accusing the Rwandan Patriotic Army of atrocities against the Hutu, along with 252 broadcasts that called for Hutus to kill the Tutsi. One such broadcast stated, "Someone must ... make them disappear for good ... to wipe them from human memory ... to exterminate the Tutsi from the surface of the earth." By the time the violence began, the young Hutu population had absorbed months of propaganda that characterized all Tutsi as dangerous enemies that must be killed before they seized control of the country. The RTLM's role in the genocide earned it the nickname "Radio Machete" as it related to their incitement to genocide. A 2014 study by Harvard Kennedy School researcher David Yanagizawa-Drott found that approximately 10% of the overall violence during the Rwandan genocide can be attributed to this new radio station. Gordon Danning, a researcher with the free speech advocacy group Foundation for Individual Rights in Education questioned the assumption of that paper that media availability correlated with media consumption.

=== Assassination of Habyarimana ===
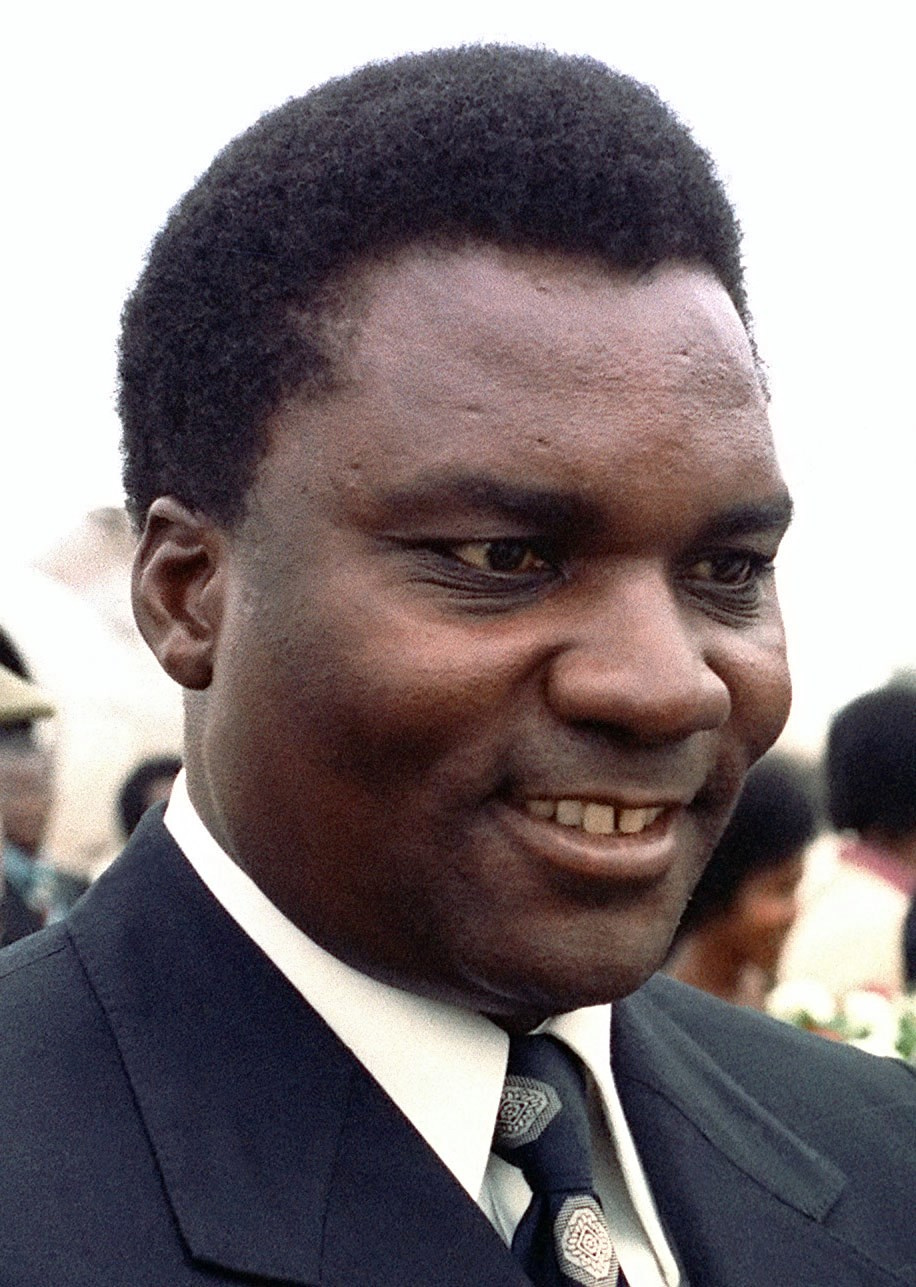
Juvénal Habyarimana in 1980

On 6 April 1994, the airplane carrying Rwandan President Juvénal Habyarimana and Cyprien Ntaryamira, the Hutu president of Burundi, was shot down as it prepared to land in Kigali, killing everyone on board. Responsibility for the attack was disputed, with both the RPF and Hutu extremists being blamed. In 2006, an eight-year investigation by the French judge Jean-Louis Bruguière concluded that Paul Kagame had ordered the assassination. An investigation by the Rwandan government made public in 2010 blamed Hutu extremists in the Rwandan army. In January 2012, a French investigation was widely published as exonerating the RPF, but according to Filip Reyntjens, the report did not exonerate the RPF. In November 2014, Emmanuel Mughisa (also known as Emile Gafarita), a former Rwandan soldier who said he had evidence that Kagame had ordered Habyarimana's plane shot down, was abducted in Nairobi hours after he was called to testify at the French inquiry. He was reportedly "join[ing] a long list of Mr Kagame's opponents who have disappeared or died". Despite disagreements about the perpetrators, many observers believe the attack and deaths of the two Hutu presidents served as the catalyst for the genocide.

Following Habyarimana's death, on the evening of 6 April, a crisis committee was formed; it consisted of Major General Augustin Ndindiliyimana, Colonel Théoneste Bagosora, and a number of other senior army staff officers. The committee was headed by Bagosora, despite the presence of the more senior Ndindiliyimana. Prime Minister Agathe Uwilingiyimana was legally next in the line of political succession, but the committee refused to recognise her authority. Roméo Dallaire met with the committee that night and insisted that Uwilingiyimana be placed in charge, but Bagosora refused, saying Uwilingiyimana did not "enjoy the confidence of the Rwandan people" and was "incapable of governing the nation". The committee also justified its existence as being essential to avoid uncertainty following the president's death. Bagosora sought to convince UNAMIR and the RPF that the committee was acting to contain the presidential guard, which he described as "out of control", and that it would abide by the Arusha agreement.

=== Killing of moderate leaders ===
UNAMIR sent an escort of ten Belgian soldiers to Prime Minister Uwilingiyimana, with the intention of transporting her to the Radio Rwanda offices to address the nation. This plan was cancelled because the presidential guard took over the radio station shortly afterward and would not permit Uwilingiyimana to speak on air. Later in the morning, a number of soldiers and a crowd of civilians overwhelmed the Belgians guarding Uwilingiyimana, forcing them to surrender their weapons. Uwilingiyimana and her husband were killed, although their children survived by hiding behind furniture and were rescued by Senegalese UNAMIR officer Mbaye Diagne. The ten Belgians were taken to the Camp Kigali military base, where they were tortured and killed. Major Bernard Ntuyahaga, the commanding officer of the presidential guard unit which carried out the murders, was sentenced to 20 years' imprisonment by a court in Belgium in 2007.

In addition to assassinating Uwilingiyimana, the extremists spent the night of 6–7 April moving around the houses of Kigali with lists of prominent moderate politicians and journalists, on a mission to kill them. Fatalities that evening included President of the Constitutional Court Joseph Kavaruganda, Minister of Agriculture Frederic Nzamurambaho, Parti Liberal leader Landwald Ndasingwa and his Canadian wife, and chief Arusha negotiator Boniface Ngulinzira. A few moderates survived, including prime minister-designate Faustin Twagiramungu, but the plot was largely successful. According to Dallaire, "by noon on 7 April, the moderate political leadership of Rwanda was dead or in hiding, the potential for a future moderate government utterly lost." An exception to this was the new army chief of staff, Marcel Gatsinzi; Bagosora's preferred candidate Augustin Bizimungu was rejected by the crisis committee, forcing Bagosora to agree to Gatsinzi's appointment. Gatsinzi attempted to keep the army out of the genocide, and to negotiate a ceasefire with the RPF, but he had only limited control over his troops and was replaced by the hardline Bizimungu after just ten days.

== Genocide ==
External videos
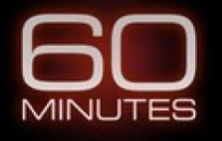
- via YouTube
- Rwandan genocide: Hiding from death

Genocidal killings began the following day. Soldiers, police, and militia quickly executed key Tutsi and moderate Hutu military and political leaders who could have assumed control in the ensuing power vacuum. Checkpoints and barricades were erected to screen all holders of the national ID card of Rwanda, which contained ethnic classifications. This enabled government forces to systematically identify and kill Tutsi.

They also recruited and pressured Hutu civilians to arm themselves with machetes, clubs, blunt objects, and other weapons and encouraged them to rape, maim, and kill their Tutsi neighbours and to destroy or steal their property. The RPF restarted its offensive soon after Habyarimana's assassination. It rapidly seized control of the northern part of the country and captured Kigali about 100 days later in mid-July, bringing an end to the genocide. During these events and in the aftermath, the UN and countries including the United States, the United Kingdom, and Belgium were criticized for their inaction and failure to strengthen the force and mandate of the UN Assistance Mission for Rwanda (UNAMIR) peacekeepers. In December 2017, media reports revealed that the French government continued supporting the Hutu government after the genocide began.

=== Planning and organization ===
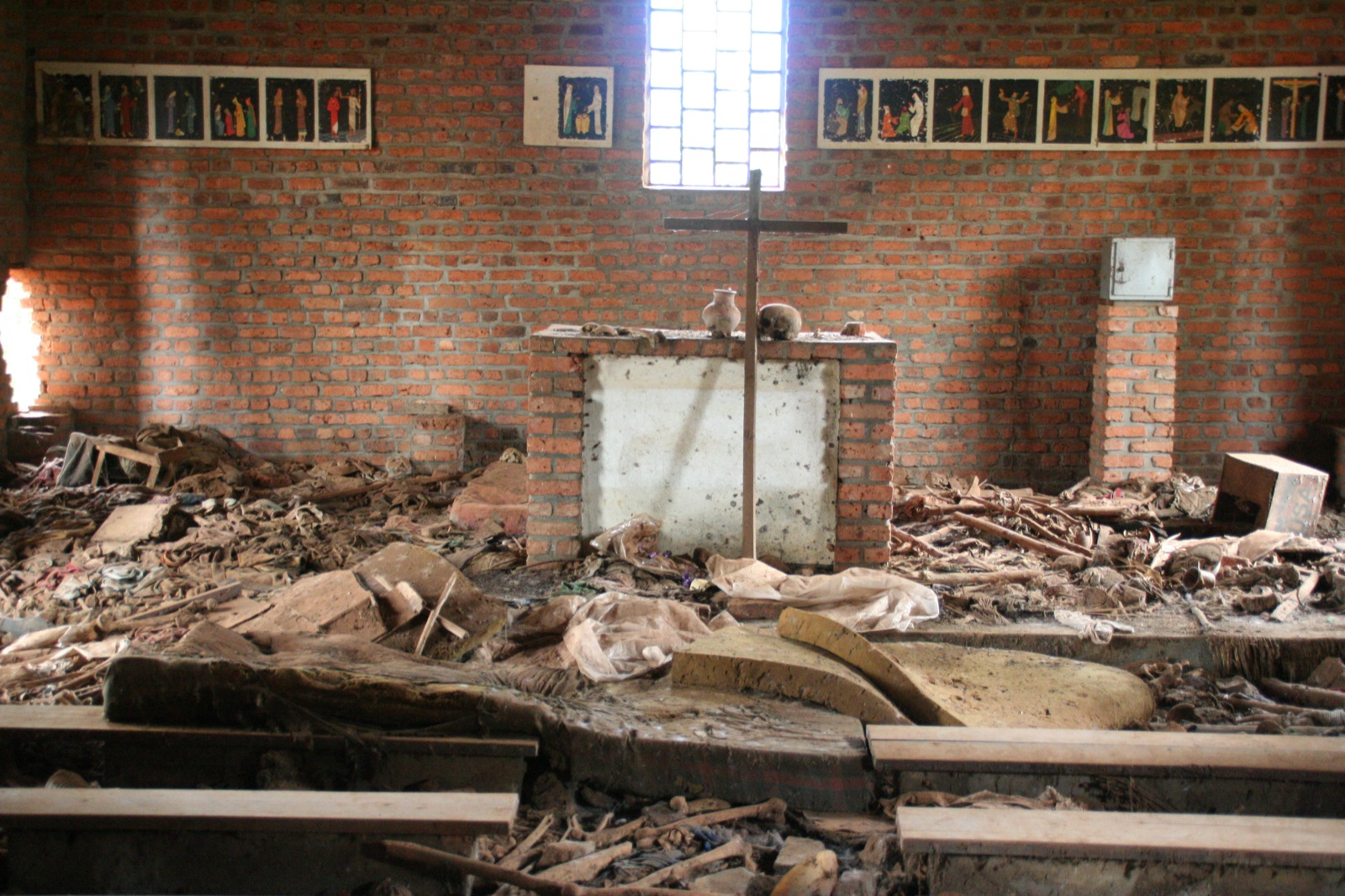
Over 5,000 people seeking refuge in Ntarama church were killed by grenade, machete, rifle, or burnt alive.

Rwanda was divided into 11 prefectures and 145 communes in 1994.

The large-scale killing of Tutsi began within a few hours of Habyarimana's death. The crisis committee, headed by Théoneste Bagosora, took power in the country following Habyarimana's death, and was the principal authority coordinating the genocide. Following the assassination of Habyarimana, Bagosora immediately began issuing orders to kill Tutsi, addressing groups of interahamwe in person in Kigali, and making telephone calls to leaders in the prefectures. Other leading organisers on a national level were defence minister Augustin Bizimana; commander of the paratroopers Aloys Ntabakuze; and the head of the Presidential Guard, Protais Mpiranya. Businessman Félicien Kabuga funded the RTLM and the Interahamwe, while Pascal Musabe and Joseph Nzirorera were responsible for coordinating the Interahamwe and Impuzamugambi militia activities nationally.

Military leaders in Gisenyi prefecture, the heartland of the akazu, were initially the most organized, convening a gathering of the interahamwe and civilian Hutus. The commanders announced the president's death (for which they blamed the RPF), and ordered the crowd to "begin your work" and to "spare no one", including infants. The killing spread to Ruhengeri, Kibuye, Kigali, Kibungo, Gikongoro and Cyangugu prefectures on 7 April; in each case, local officials, responding to orders from Kigali, spread rumours that the RPF had killed the president, followed by a command to kill Tutsi. The Hutu population, which had been prepared and armed during the preceding months, and maintained the Rwandan tradition of obedience to authority, carried out the orders without question. On the other hand, there are views that the genocide was not sudden, irresistible or uniformly orchestrated, but "a cascade of tipping points, and each tipping point was the outcome of local, intra-ethnic contests for dominance (among Hutu)". The protracted struggles for supremacy in local communes meant that a more determined stance from the international community would likely have prevented the worst from happening.

In Kigali, the genocide was led by the Presidential Guard, the elite unit of the army. They were assisted by the Interahamwe and Impuzamugambi, who set up roadblocks throughout the capital. Each person passing the roadblock was required to show the national identity card, which included ethnicity, and any with Tutsi cards were killed immediately. The militias also searched houses in the city, killing Tutsi and looting their property. Tharcisse Renzaho, the prefect of Kigali-ville, played a leading role, touring the roadblocks to ensure their effectiveness and using his position at the top of the Kigali provincial government to disseminate orders and dismiss officials who were not sufficiently active in the killings.

In rural areas, the local government hierarchy was also in most cases the chain of command for the execution of the genocide. The prefect of each prefecture, acting on orders from Kigali, disseminated instructions to the commune leaders (bourgmestres), who in turn issued directions to the leaders of the sectors, cells and villages within their communes. The majority of the actual killings in the countryside were carried out by ordinary civilians, under orders from the leaders. Tutsi and Hutu lived side by side in their villages, and families all knew each other, making it easy for Hutu to identify and target their Tutsi neighbours. Gerard Prunier ascribes this mass complicity of the population to a combination of "democratic majority" ideology, in which Hutus had been taught to regard Tutsi as dangerous enemies, a culture of unbending obedience to authority, and duress—villagers refusing to kill were often branded Tutsi sympathisers and murdered.

=== Interim government ===
There were few killings in the prefectures of Gitarama and Butare during the early phase, as the prefects of those areas were moderates opposed to the violence. The genocide began in Gitarama after the interim government relocated to the prefecture on 12 April. Butare was ruled by the only Tutsi prefect in the country, Jean-Baptiste Habyalimana. Habyalimana refused to authorise any killings in his territory, and for a while Butare became a sanctuary for Tutsi refugees from elsewhere in the country. This lasted until 18 April, when the interim government dismissed him from his post and replaced him with government loyalist Sylvain Nsabimana.

The crisis committee appointed an interim government on 8 April; using the terms of the 1991 constitution instead of the Arusha Accords, the committee designated Théodore Sindikubwabo as interim president of Rwanda, while Jean Kambanda was the new prime minister. All political parties were represented in the government, but most members were from the "Hutu Power" wings of their respective parties. The interim government was sworn in on 9 April, but relocated from Kigali to Gitarama on 12 April, ostensibly fleeing RPF's advance on the capital. The crisis committee was officially dissolved, but Bagosora and the senior officers remained the de facto rulers of the country. The government played its part in mobilising the population, giving the regime an air of legitimacy, but was effectively a puppet regime with no ability to halt the army or the Interahamwe's activities. When Roméo Dallaire visited the government's headquarters a week after its formation, he found most officials at leisure, describing their activities as "sorting out the seating plan for a meeting that was not about to convene any time soon".

=== Death toll and timeline ===
During the remainder of April and early May, the Presidential Guard, gendarmerie and the youth militia, aided by local populations, continued killing at a very high rate. The goal was to kill every Tutsi living in Rwanda and, with the exception of the advancing rebel RPF army, there was no opposition force to prevent or slow the killings. The domestic opposition had already been eliminated, and UNAMIR were expressly forbidden to use force except in self-defence. In rural areas, where Tutsi and Hutus lived side by side and families knew each other, it was easy for Hutu to identify and target their Tutsi neighbours. In urban areas, where residents were more anonymous, identification was facilitated using roadblocks guarded by military and interahamwe; each person passing the roadblock was required to show the national identity card, which included ethnicity, and any with Tutsi cards were killed immediately. Many Hutus were also killed for a variety of reasons, including sympathy for moderate opposition parties, being a journalist or simply having a "Tutsi appearance". Thousands of bodies were dumped into the Kagera River, which ran along the northern border between Rwanda and Uganda and flowed into Lake Victoria. Consumers refused to buy fish caught in Lake Victoria for fear that they were tainted by decomposing corpses, causing significant damage to the Ugandan fishing industry. The Ugandan government responded by dispatching teams to retrieve the bodies from the Kagera River before they entered the lake. The RPF was making slow but steady gains in the north and east of the country, ending the killings in each area occupied. The genocide was effectively ended during April in areas of Ruhengeri, Byumba, Kibungo and Kigali prefectures. The killings ceased during April in the akazu heartlands of western Ruhengeri and Gisenyi, as almost every Tutsi had been eliminated. Fearing retribution, many Hutus fled RPF-conquered areas. 500,000 Kibungo residents walked over the bridge at Rusumo Falls into Tanzania in a few days at the end of April, and were accommodated in United Nations camps effectively controlled by ousted leaders of the Hutu regime, with the former prefect of Kibungo prefecture in overall control.

In the remaining prefectures, killings grew increasingly sporadic throughout May and June; most Tutsi were already dead, and the interim government wished to rein in the growing anarchy and engage the population in fighting the RPF. On 23 June, around 2,500 soldiers entered southwestern Rwanda as part of the French-led United Nations Opération Turquoise. This was intended as a humanitarian mission, but the soldiers were not able to save significant numbers of lives. The genocidal authorities were overtly welcoming of the French, displaying the French flag on their own vehicles, but killing Tutsi who came out of hiding seeking protection. In July, the RPF completed their conquest of the country, with the exception of the zone occupied by Operation Turquoise. The RPF took Kigali on 4 July, and Gisenyi and the rest of the northwest on 18 July. The genocide ended the following day, but as had occurred in Kibungo, the Hutu population fled en masse across the border, this time into Zaire, with Bagosora and the other leaders accompanying them.

Impact of the genocide on average life expectancy

The succeeding RPF government claims that 1,074,017 people were killed in the genocide, 94% of whom were Tutsi. In contrast, Human Rights Watch, following on-the-ground research, estimated the casualties at 507,000 people. According to a 2020 symposium of the Journal of Genocide Research, the official figure is not credible as it overestimates the number of Tutsi in Rwanda prior to the genocide. Using different methodologies, the scholars in the symposium estimated 500,000 to 600,000 deaths—around two-thirds of the Tutsi population in Rwanda at the time. Thousands of widows, many subjected to rape, contracted HIV. There were about 400,000 orphans and nearly 85,000 of them were forced to become heads of families. An estimated 2,000,000 Rwandans, mostly Hutu, were displaced and became refugees. Additionally, 30% of the pygmy Batwa were killed.

=== Means of killing ===
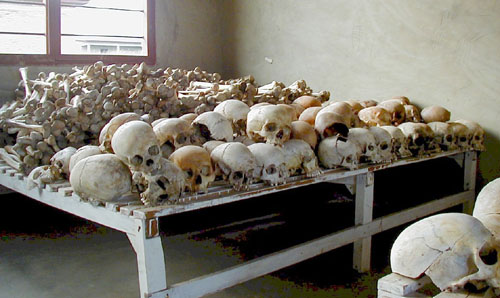
Skulls and other bones kept at Murambi Technical School

On 9 April, UN observers witnessed the massacre of children at a Polish church in Gikondo. That same day, 1,000 heavily armed and well-trained European troops arrived to evacuate European civilians from Rwanda. The troops did not stay to assist UNAMIR. Media coverage picked up on the 9th, as The Washington Post reported the execution of Rwandan employees of relief agencies in front of their expatriate colleagues.

Butare prefecture was an exception to the local violence. Jean-Baptiste Habyalimana was the only Tutsi prefect, and the prefecture was the only one dominated by an opposition party. Opposing the genocide, Habyalimana was able to keep relative calm in the prefecture, until he was deposed by the extremist Sylvain Nsabimana. Finding the population of Butare resistant to murdering their citizens, the government flew in militia from Kigali by helicopter, who readily killed the Tutsi.

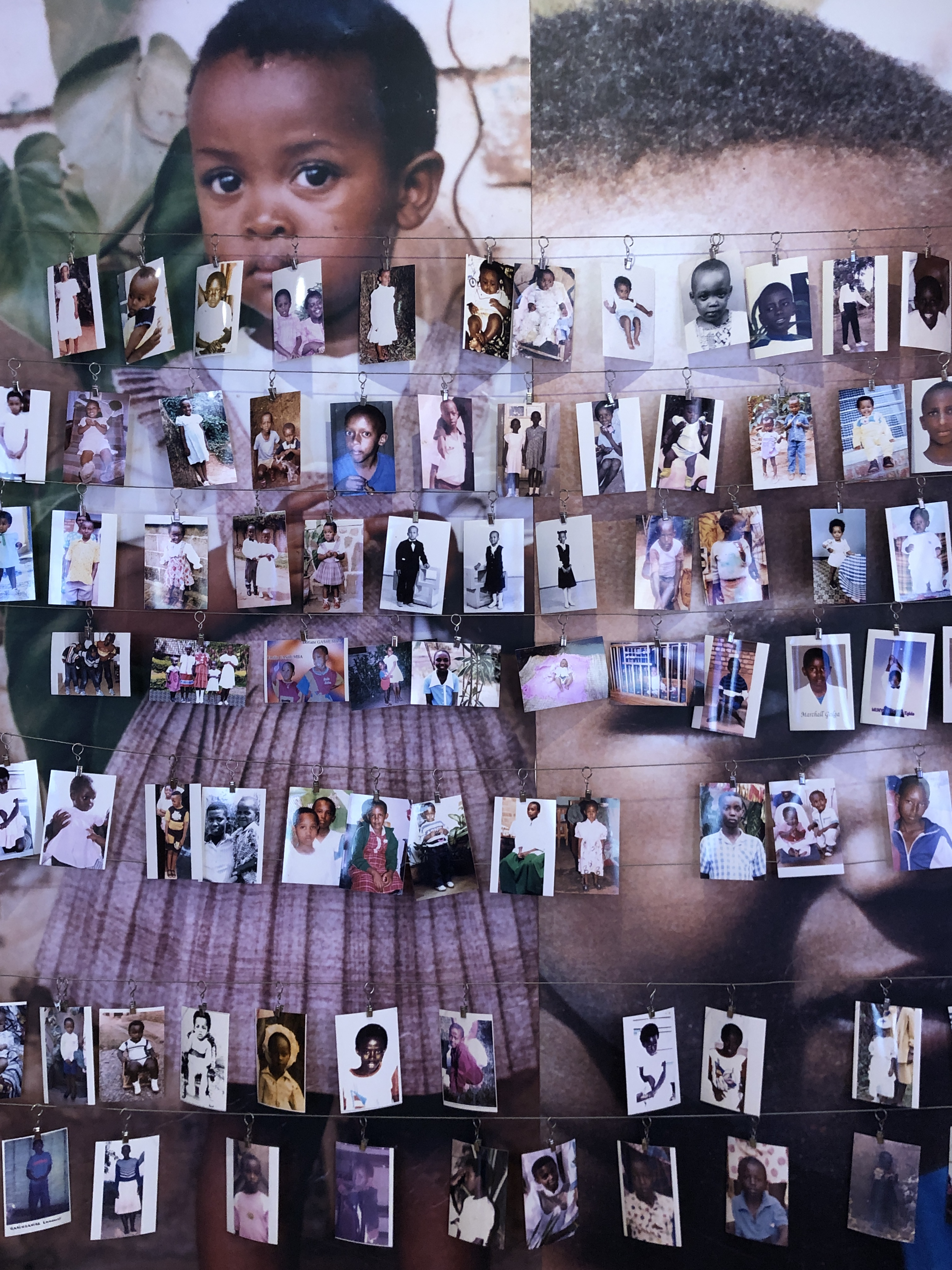
Photographs of genocide victims displayed at the Genocide Memorial Center in Kigali

Most victims were killed in their own villages or in towns, often by neighbours and fellow villagers. The militia typically used machetes, although some army units used rifles. Hutu gangs searched for victims hiding in churches and school buildings and massacred them. Local officials and government-sponsored radio incited ordinary citizens to kill their neighbours, and those who refused to kill were often murdered on the spot: "Either you took part in the massacres or you were massacred yourself."

One such massacre occurred at Nyarubuye. On 12 April, more than 1,500 Tutsi sought refuge in a Catholic church in Nyange, then in Kivumu commune. Local Interahamwe, acting in concert with the authorities, used bulldozers to knock down the church building. The militia used machetes and rifles to kill every person who tried to escape. Local priest Athanase Seromba was later found guilty and sentenced to life in prison by the ICTR for his role in the demolition of his church; he was convicted of the crime of genocide and crimes against humanity. In another case, thousands sought refuge in the Official Technical School (École technique officielle) in Kigali where Belgian UNAMIR soldiers were stationed. On 11 April, the Belgian soldiers withdrew, and Rwandan armed forces and militia killed all the Tutsi.

=== Sexual violence ===
Rape was used as a tool by the Interahamwe, the chief perpetrators, to separate the consciously heterogeneous population and to drastically exhaust the opposing group. The use of propaganda played an important role in both the genocide and the gender specific violence. The Hutu propaganda depicted Tutsi women as "a sexually seductive 'fifth column' in league with the Hutus' enemies". The exceptional brutality of the sexual violence, as well as the complicity of Hutu women in the attacks, suggests that the use of propaganda had been effective in the exploitation of gendered needs which had mobilized both females and males to participate. Soldiers of the Army for the Liberation of Rwanda and the Rwandan Defence Forces, including the Presidential Guard, and civilians also committed rape against mostly Tutsi women. Although Tutsi women were the main targets, moderate Hutu women were also raped.

Along with the Hutu moderates, Hutu women who were married to or who hid Tutsis were also targeted. In his 1996 report on Rwanda, the UN Special Rapporteur Rene Degni-Segui stated, "Rape was the rule and its absence was the exception." He also noted, "Rape was systematic and was used as a weapon." With this thought and using methods of force and threat, the genocidaires forced others to stand by during rapes. A testimonial by a woman of the name Marie Louise Niyobuhungiro recalled seeing local peoples, other generals and Hutu men watching her get raped about five times a day. Even when she was kept under watch of a woman, the woman would give no sympathy or help and furthermore forced her to farm land in between rapes.

Many of the survivors became infected with HIV from the HIV-infected men recruited by the genocidaires. During the conflict, Hutu extremists released hundreds of patients suffering from AIDS from hospitals, and formed them into "rape squads". The intent was to infect and cause a "slow, inexorable death" for their future Tutsi rape victims. Tutsi women were also targeted with the intent of destroying their reproductive capabilities. Sexual mutilation sometimes occurred after the rape and included mutilation of the vagina with machetes, knives, sharpened sticks, boiling water, and acid. Men were also the victims of sexual violation, including public mutilation of the genitals.

Some experts have estimated that between 250,000 and 500,000 women were raped during the genocide.

== Killing of the Twa ==
The pygmy people called the Batwa (or "Twa") made up about 1% of Rwanda's population. A report shows that the group has been described as people who lived in forests and off lands, but currently the Twa are dispersed in the country in smaller groups while integrating into society. Although the Twa were not directly targeted by the genocidaires, an estimated 10,000 of a population of 30,000 were nonetheless killed. They are sometimes referred to as the "forgotten victims" of the Rwandan genocide. In the months leading up to the genocide, Hutu radio stations accused the Batwa of aiding the RPF and Twa survivors describe Hutu fighters as threatening to kill them all.

== Rwandan Patriotic Front's military campaign and victory ==
Map showing the advance of the RPF during the Rwandan genocide of 1994

On 7 April, as the genocide started, RPF commander Paul Kagame warned the crisis committee and UNAMIR that he would resume the civil war if the killing did not stop. The next day, Rwandan government forces attacked the national parliament building from several directions, but RPF troops stationed there successfully fought back. The RPF then began an attack from the north on three fronts, seeking to link up quickly with the isolated troops in Kigali. Kagame refused to talk to the interim government, believing that it was just a cover for Bagosora's rule and not committed to ending the genocide. Over the next few days, the RPF advanced steadily south, capturing Gabiro and large areas of the countryside to the north and east of Kigali. They avoided attacking the capital city Kigali or Byumba, but conducted manoeuvres designed to encircle the cities and cut off supply routes. The RPF also allowed Tutsi refugees from Uganda to settle behind the front line in the RPF controlled areas.

Throughout April, there were numerous attempts by UNAMIR to establish a ceasefire, but Kagame insisted each time that the RPF would not stop fighting unless the killings stopped. In late April, the RPF secured the whole of the Tanzanian border area and began to move west from Kibungo, to the south of Kigali. They encountered little resistance, except around Kigali and Ruhengeri. By 16 May, they had cut the road between Kigali and Gitarama, the temporary home of the interim government, and by 13 June, had taken Gitarama itself, following an unsuccessful attempt by the Rwandan government forces to reopen the road; the interim government was forced to relocate to Gisenyi in the far north west. As well as fighting the war, Kagame recruited heavily to expand the army. The new recruits included Tutsi survivors of the genocide and refugees from Burundi, but were less well trained and disciplined than the earlier recruits.

Having completed the encirclement of Kigali, the RPF spent the latter half of June fighting for the city itself. The government forces had superior manpower and weapons, but the RPF steadily gained territory and conducted raids to rescue civilians from behind enemy lines. According to Dallaire, this success was due to Kagame's being a "master of psychological warfare"; he exploited the fact that the government forces were concentrating on the genocide rather than the fight for Kigali, and capitalised on the government's loss of morale as it lost territory. The RPF finally defeated the Rwandan government forces in Kigali on 4 July, and on 18 July took Gisenyi and the rest of the northwest, forcing the interim government to flee into Zaire and finally ending the genocide. At the end of July 1994, Kagame's forces held the whole of Rwanda except for the zone in the south-west which had been occupied by a French-led United Nations force as part of Opération Turquoise.

The Liberation Day for Rwanda would come to be marked as 4 July and is commemorated as a public holiday.

=== Killings by the Rwandan Patriotic Front ===
During the genocide and in the months following the RPF victory, RPF soldiers killed many people, although the number of casualties is disputed. Alison Des Forges was one of the first researchers to conclude that RPF committed atrocities in a systematic fashion that were directed by officers with a high level of authority. She estimated that RPF killed around 30,000 people considered enemies of the Tutsi. Some witnesses blamed Kagame himself for ordering killings. After ICTR investigators reportedly discovered two layers of bodies in a mass grave in Kibuye in early 1996—one of Tutsi victims of the genocide and another left by RPF killings of Hutu civilians—further forensic investigations were prohibited by the Rwandan government. French scholar André Guichaoua charged the post-genocide government with deliberate destruction of evidence regarding killings of Hutu to avoid prosecution by the ICTR. Some critics have suggested that these crimes should have been prosecuted by the ICTR, or even amounted to genocide under international law. In contrast, the post-genocide regime maintains that killings by RPF soldiers were perpetrated by undisciplined recruits seeking revenge and that all such transgressions were promptly punished.

The first rumours of RPF killings emerged after 250,000 mostly Hutu refugees streamed into Tanzania at the border crossing of Rusumo on 28 April 1994. The refugees had fled before the Tutsi rebels arrived because they believed the RPF were committing atrocities. A spokesperson for the United Nations High Commissioner for Refugees (UNHCR) observed that "There's a lot of propaganda by the Government radio aimed at the Hutu" which "makes them feel very anti-Tutsi." After the RPF took control of the border crossing at Rusumo on 30 April, refugees continued to cross the Kagera River, ending up in remote areas of Tanzania. In early May, the UNHCR began hearing concrete accounts of atrocities and made this information public on 17 May.

After the RPF took power in Rwanda, UNHCR sent a team led by Robert Gersony to investigate the prospects for a speedy return of the nearly two million refugees that had fled Rwanda since April. After interviewing 300 people, Gersony concluded that "clearly systematic murders and persecution of the Hutu population in certain parts of the country" had taken place. Gersony's findings were suppressed by the United Nations. The Gersony Report did not technically exist because Gersony did not complete it, but a summary of an oral presentation of his findings was leaked in 2010. Gersony's personal conclusion was that between April and August 1994, the RPF had killed "between 25,000 and 45,000 persons, between 5,000 and 10,000 persons each month from April through July and 5,000 for the month of August." The new authorities categorically denied the allegations of Gersony, details of which leaked to the press. According to an RPA officer, "There was not time to do proper screening. ... We needed a force, and some of those recruited were thieves and criminals. Those people have been responsible for much of our trouble today." In an interview with journalist Stephen Kinzer, Kagame acknowledged that killings had occurred but stated that they were carried out by rogue soldiers and had been impossible to control.

The RPF killings gained international attention with the 1995 Kibeho massacre, in which soldiers opened fire on a camp for internally displaced persons in Butare prefecture. Australian soldiers serving as part of UNAMIR estimated at least 4,000 people were killed, while the Rwandan government claimed that the death toll was 338.

== International response ==
=== Media ===
On April 11, the events were described for the first time as genocide by the Swiss journalist Jean-Philippe Ceppi, in the French daily newspaper Libération.

=== United Nations ===
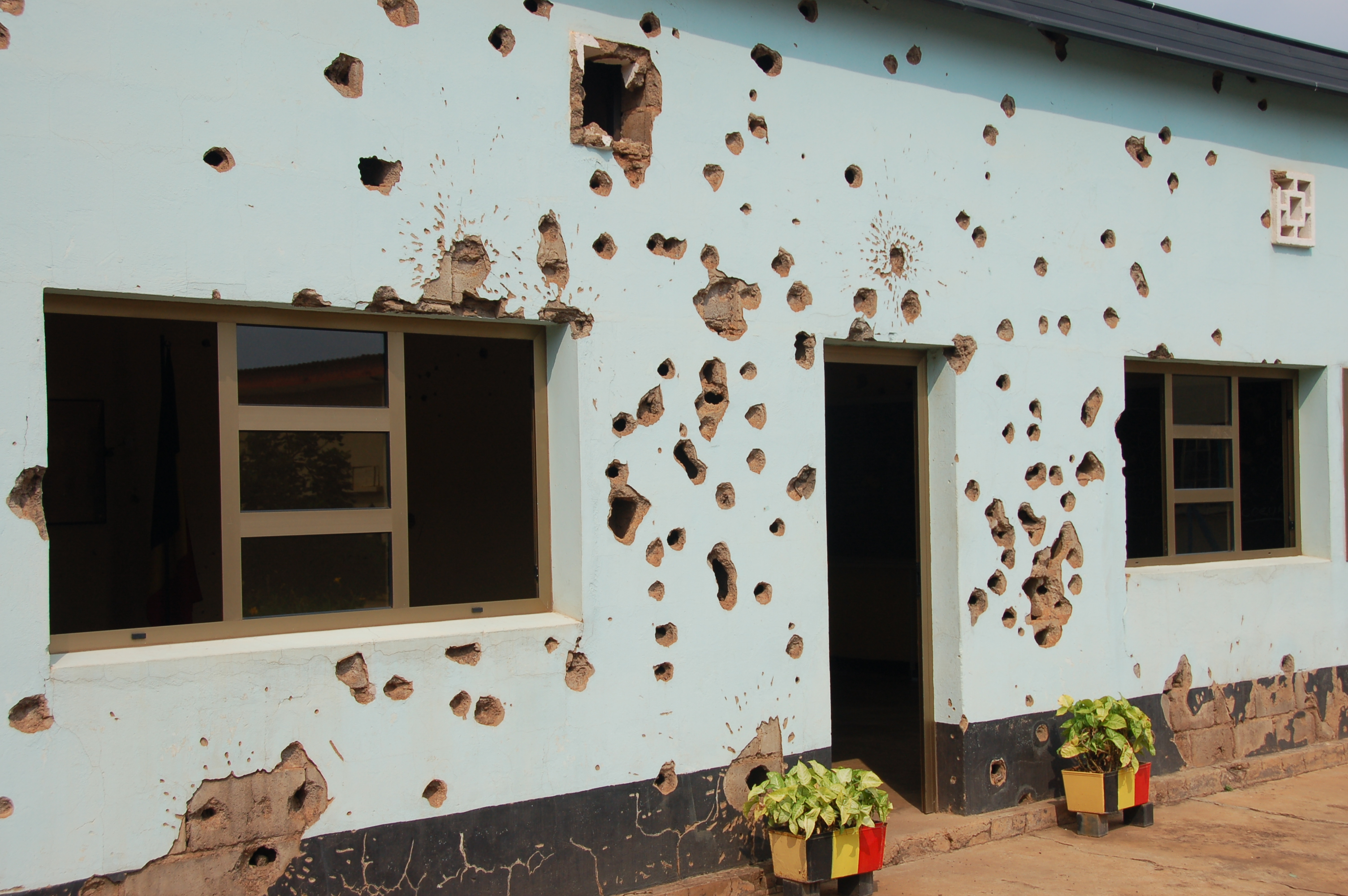
The building in which ten Belgian UNAMIR soldiers were massacred and mutilated. Today the site is preserved as a memorial for the soldiers.

The United Nations Assistance Mission for Rwanda (UNAMIR) had been in Rwanda since October 1993, with a mandate to oversee the implementation of the Arusha Accords. UNAMIR commander Roméo Dallaire learned of the Hutu Power movement during the mission's deployment, as well as plans for the mass extermination of Tutsi. He also became aware of secret weapons caches through an informant, but his request to raid them was turned down by the UN Department of Peacekeeping Operations (DPKO), which felt that Dallaire was exceeding his mandate and had to be kept "on a leash". Seizing the weapons was argued to be squarely within UNAMIR's mandate; both sides had requested UNAMIR and it had been authorized by the UN Security Council in Resolution 872.

UNAMIR's effectiveness in peacekeeping was also hampered by President Habyarimana and Hutu hardliners, and by April 1994, the Security Council threatened to terminate UNAMIR's mandate if it did not make progress. Following the death of Habyarimana, and the start of the genocide, Dallaire liaised repeatedly with both the Crisis Committee and the RPF, attempting to re-establish peace and prevent the resumption of the civil war. Neither side was interested in a ceasefire, the government because it was controlled by the genocidaires, and the RPF because it considered it necessary to fight to stop the killings. UNAMIR's Chapter VI mandate rendered it powerless to intervene militarily, and most of its Rwandan staff were killed in the early days of the genocide, severely limiting its ability to operate.

UNAMIR was therefore largely reduced to a bystander role, and Dallaire later labelled it a "failure". Its most significant contribution was to provide refuge for thousands of Tutsi and moderate Hutu at its headquarters in Amahoro Stadium, as well as other secure UN sites, and to assist with the evacuation of foreign nationals. On 12 April, the Belgian government, which was one of the largest troop contributors to UNAMIR, and had lost ten soldiers protecting Prime Minister Uwilingiliyimana, announced that it was withdrawing, reducing the force's effectiveness even further. On 17 May 1994, the UN passed Resolution 918, which imposed an arms embargo and reinforced UNAMIR, which would be known as UNAMIR II. The new soldiers did not start arriving until June, and following the end of the genocide in July, the role of UNAMIR II was largely confined to maintaining security and stability, until its termination in 1996.

=== France and Opération Turquoise ===
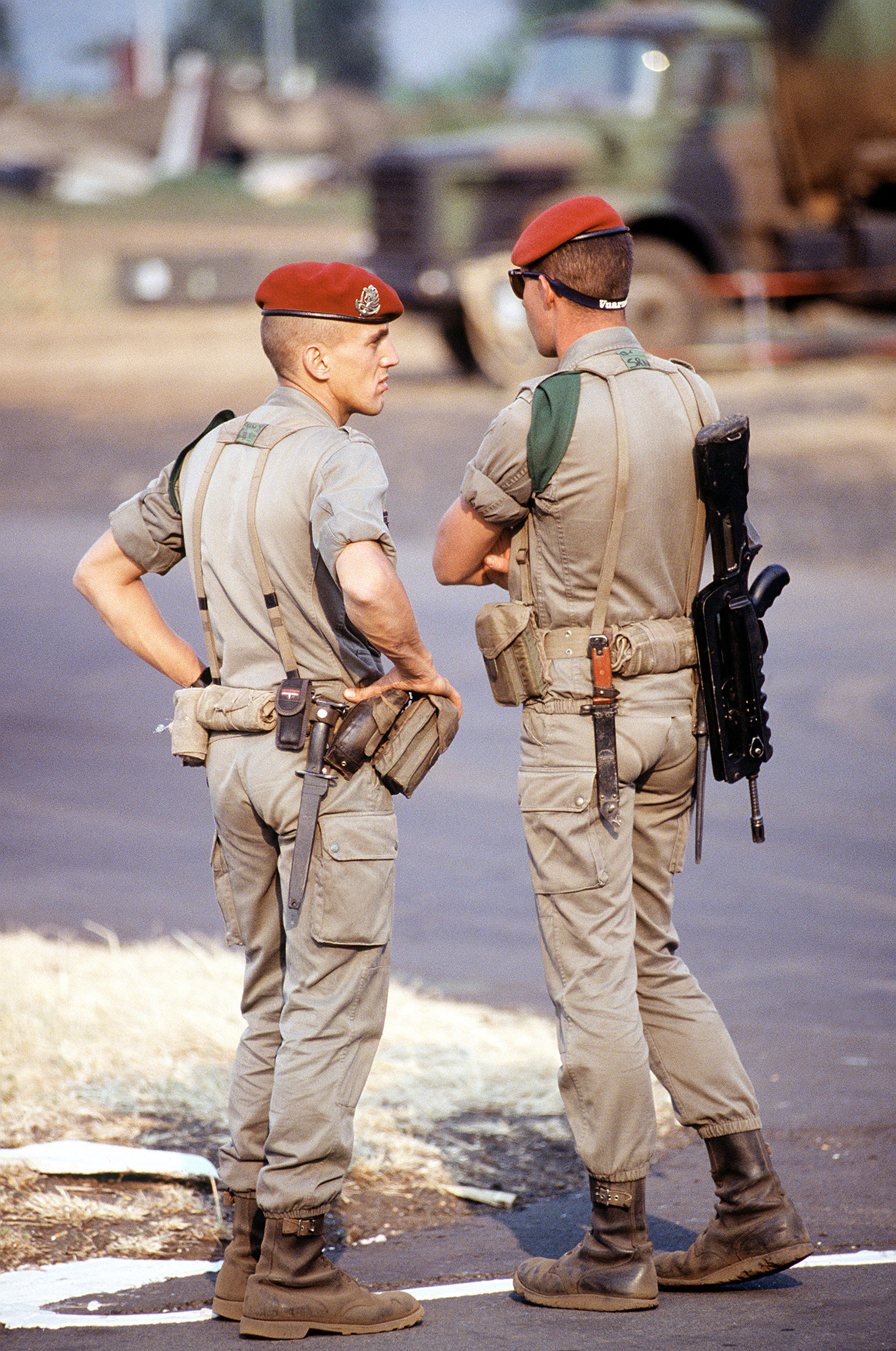
French marine parachutists stand guard at the airport, August 1994.

During President Habyarimana's years in power, France maintained close relations with him, as part of its Françafrique policy, and assisted Rwanda militarily against the RPF during the Civil War; France considered the RPF, along with Uganda, as part of a "plot" to increase Anglophone influence at the expense of French influence. During the first few days of the genocide, France launched Amaryllis, a military operation assisted by the Belgian army and UNAMIR, to evacuate expatriates from Rwanda. The French and Belgians refused to allow any Tutsi to accompany them, and those who boarded the evacuation trucks were forced off at Rwandan government checkpoints, where they were killed. The French also separated several expatriates and children from their Tutsi spouses, rescuing the foreigners but leaving the Rwandans to likely death. They rescued several high-profile members of Habyarimana's government, as well as his wife, Agathe.

In late June 1994, France launched Opération Turquoise, a UN-mandated mission to create safe humanitarian areas for displaced persons, refugees, and civilians in danger. From bases in the Zairian cities of Goma and Bukavu, the French entered southwestern Rwanda and established the zone Turquoise, within the Cyangugu–Kibuye–Gikongoro triangle, an area occupying approximately a fifth of Rwanda. Radio France International estimates that Turquoise saved around 15,000 lives, but with the genocide coming to an end and the RPF's ascendancy, many Rwandans interpreted Turquoise as a mission to protect Hutu from the RPF, including some who had participated in the genocide. The French remained hostile to the RPF, and their presence temporarily stalled the RPF's advance.

A number of inquiries have been held into French involvement in Rwanda, including the 1998 French Parliamentary Commission on Rwanda, which accused France of errors of judgement, including "military cooperation against a background of ethnic tensions, massacres and violence", but did not accuse France of direct responsibility for the genocide itself. A 2008 report by the Rwandan government-sponsored Mucyo Commission accused the French government of knowing of preparations for the genocide and helping to train Hutu militia members. In 2019, President Macron decided to reopen the issue of French involvement in the genocide by commissioning a new team to sort through the state archives.

In April 2021, the Rwandan government announced the study they had commissioned, alleging France "did nothing" to prevent what they deemed the "foreseeable" April and May 1994 massacres in the genocide.

=== United States ===
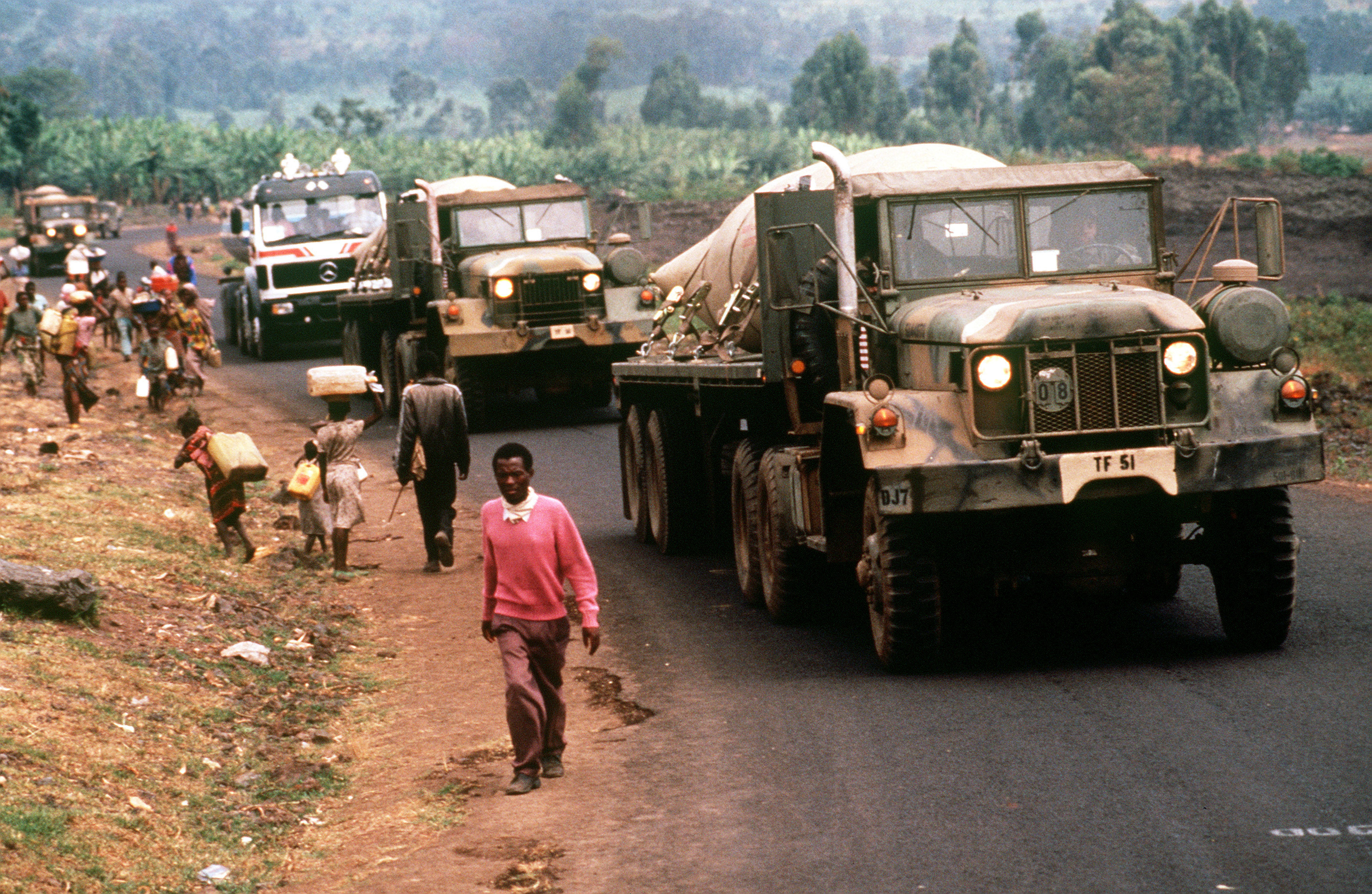
Convoy of American military vehicles bring fresh water from Goma to Rwandan refugees located at camp Kimbumba, Zaire in August 1994.

Intelligence reports indicate that United States president Bill Clinton and his cabinet were aware before the height of the massacre that a deliberate and systematic genocide to eliminate all Tutsis was planned. Fear of a repeat of the events in Somalia shaped US policy at the time, with many commentators identifying the graphic consequences of the 1993 Battle of Mogadishu as the key reason behind the US's failure to intervene in later conflicts such as the Rwandan genocide. In 1993, the bodies of several US military casualties of the conflict were dragged through the streets of Mogadishu by crowds of local civilians and members of Mohamed Farrah Aidid's Somali National Alliance. According to the former US deputy special envoy to Somalia, Walter Clarke: "The ghosts of Somalia continue to haunt US policy. Our lack of response in Rwanda was a fear of getting involved in something like a Somalia all over again." President Clinton has referred to the failure of the U.S. government to intervene in the genocide as one of his main foreign policy failings, saying "I don't think we could have ended the violence, but I think we could have cut it down. And I regret it." Eighty percent of the discussion in Washington concerned the evacuation of American citizens.

=== Catholic Church ===
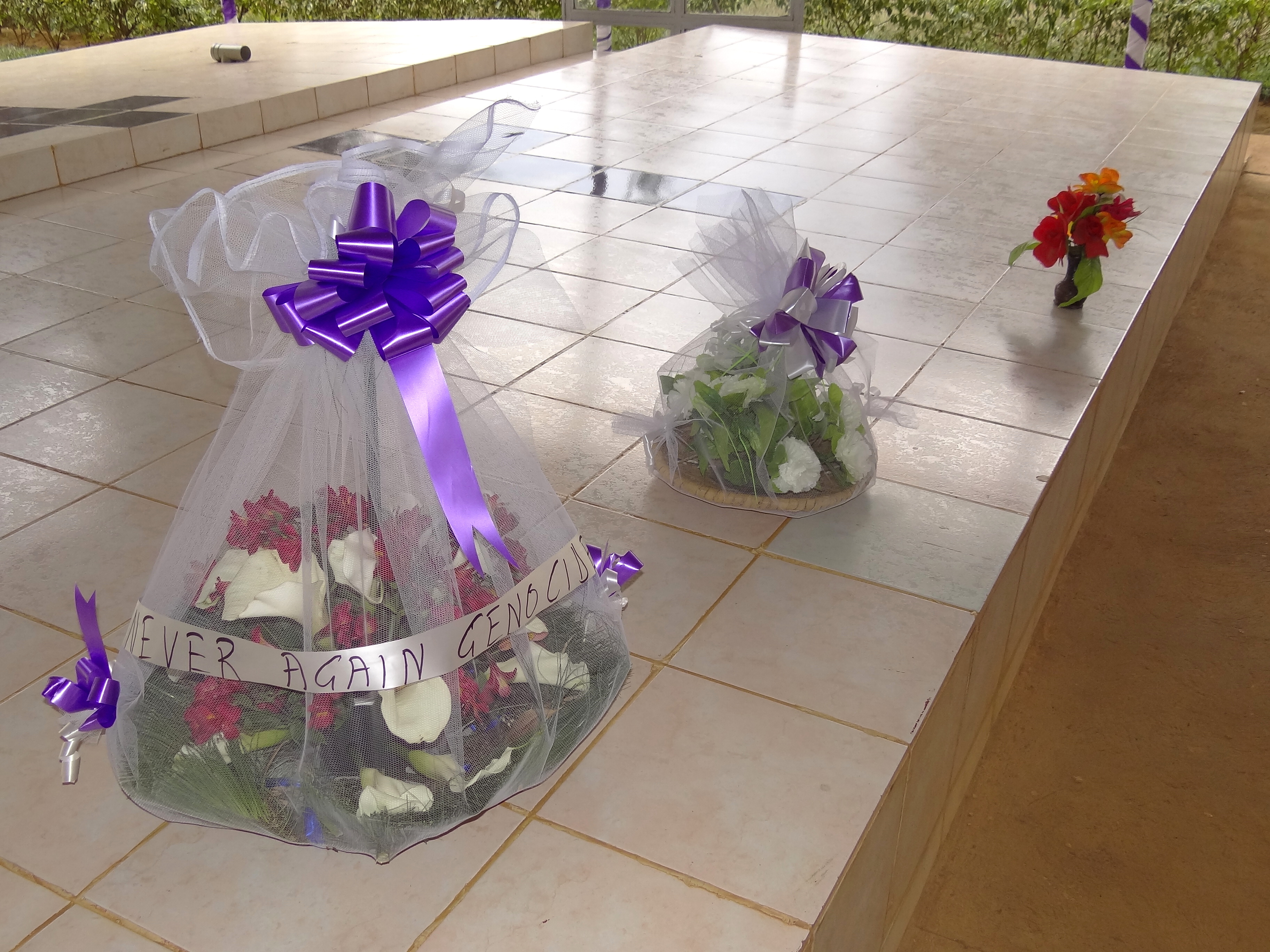
A memorial in a Catholic Church

Pope John Paul II expressed his deep concern about what was happening in April 1994. On 9 April, in a message to Rwandan Catholics he urged them "not to give way to feelings of hatred and revenge but to courageously practice dialogue and forgiveness".

The Catholic Church affirms that genocide took place but states that those who took part in it did so without the permission of the Church. Though religious factors were not prominent, in its 1999 report Human Rights Watch faulted a number of religious authorities in Rwanda, including Catholics, Anglicans and other Protestant denominations, for failing to condemn the genocide, though that accusation was belied over time. Many other clergymen gave their lives to prevent Tutsis from being killed.

Some clergy participated in the massacres. Catholic nuns Maria Kisito and Gertrude Mukangango were convicted in 2001 of involvement in the murders of 5,000–7,000 Tutsis who had sought refuge at their convent in Sovu. Witnesses testified that they had directed a death squad to the hiding place of 500-700 victims and had given petrol with which to burn down the building. In 2006, Father Athanase Seromba was sentenced to 15 years imprisonment (increased on appeal to life imprisonment) by the International Criminal Tribunal for Rwanda for his role in the massacre of 2,000 Tutsis. The court heard that Seromba lured the Tutsis to the church, where they believed they would find refuge. When they arrived, he ordered that bulldozers should be used to crush the refugees who were hiding inside the church and if any of them were still alive, Hutu militias should kill them all. Some in the Catholic Church's religious hierarchy were later tried and convicted for their participation in the genocide by the International Criminal Tribunal for Rwanda. Bishop Misago was accused of corruption and complicity in the genocide, but he was cleared of all charges in 2000.

On 20 March 2017, Pope Francis acknowledged that while some Catholic nuns and priests in the country were killed during the genocide, others were complicit in it and took part in preparing and executing it.

=== Arms sales to Rwanda ===
In her 2004 book, Linda Melvern documented that "in the three years from October 1990, Rwanda, one of the poorest countries in the world, became the third largest importer of weapons in Africa, spending an estimated $US 112 million." She cited a significant contract with Egypt in 1992, and with France and South Africa, the next year.

Before the international embargo against Rwanda on 17 May 1994, South Africa and France were two of the main suppliers of arms to Rwanda. According to Human Rights Watch, after the embargo, they diverted their arms trade through Goma airport in Zaire. Zaire played a key role in supplying arms and facilitating arms flows to the Rwandan army. Some officials also encouraged arms trafficking by private dealers.

In 2017, according to Haaretz, Israel or Israeli private arms dealers had sold arms to the Rwandan government. Israeli officials repeatedly denied this allegation. In 2016, a petition was submitted to the Israeli Supreme Court, which ruled that the records which document Israel's arms sales, notably to Rwanda, will remain sealed, citing section nine of Israel's Freedom of Information Act which allows for non-disclosure if in releasing "the information there is a concern over harming national security, its foreign relations, the security of its public or the security or well-being of an individual".

== Aftermath ==
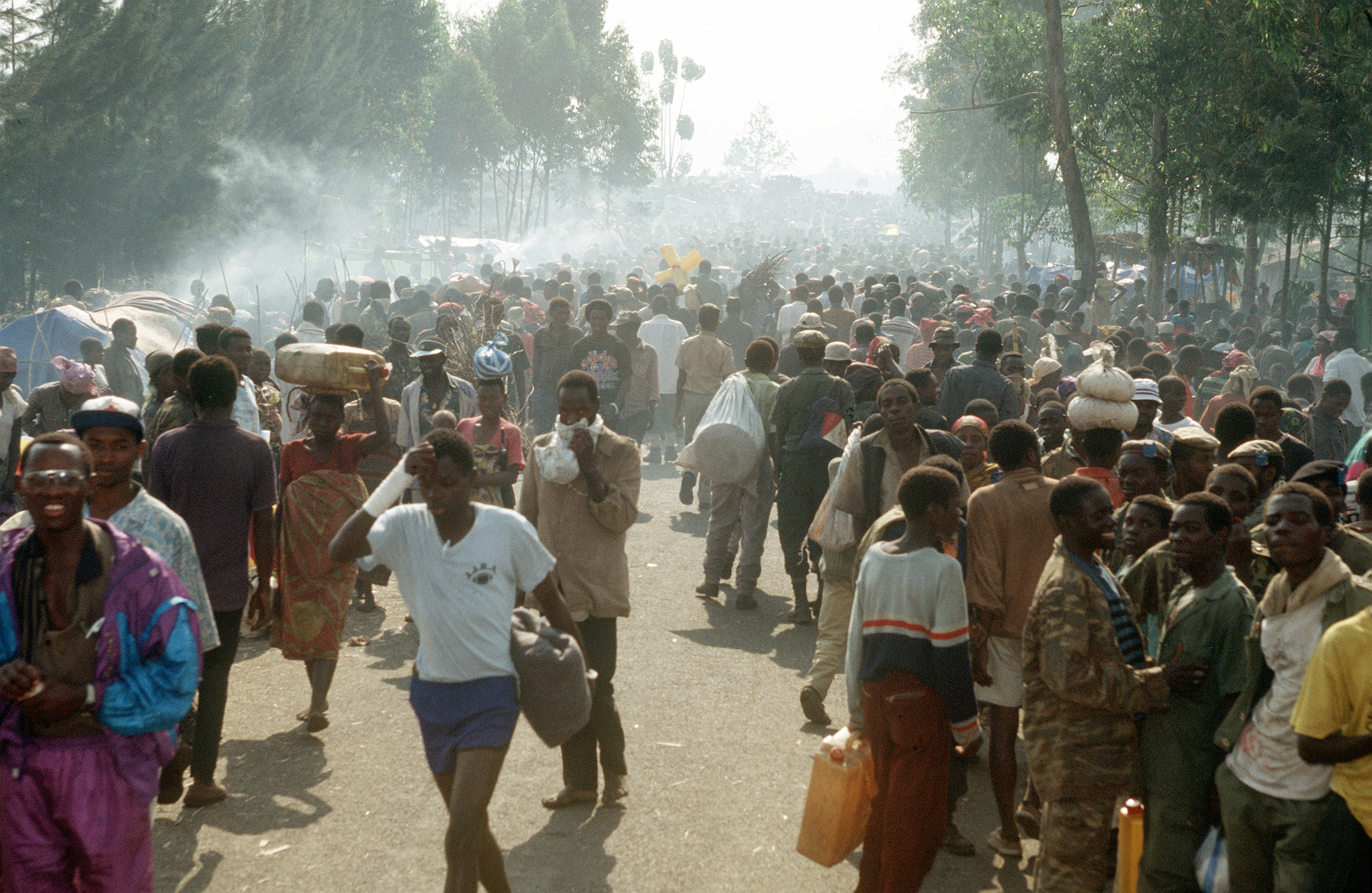
Kitali refugee camp, Zaire (1994)

Hutu refugees particularly entered the eastern portion of Zaire (now the Democratic Republic of the Congo, or DRC). Hutu genocidaires began to regroup in refugee camps along the border with Rwanda. Declaring a need to avert further genocide, the RPF-led government made military incursions into Zaire, resulting in the First (1996–97) and Second (1998–2003) Congo Wars. Armed struggles between the Rwandan government and their opponents in the DRC have continued through battles of proxy militias in the Goma region, including the M23 rebellion (2012–2013). Large Rwandan Hutu and Tutsi populations continue to live as refugees throughout the region.

=== Refugee crisis, insurgency, and two Congo Wars ===
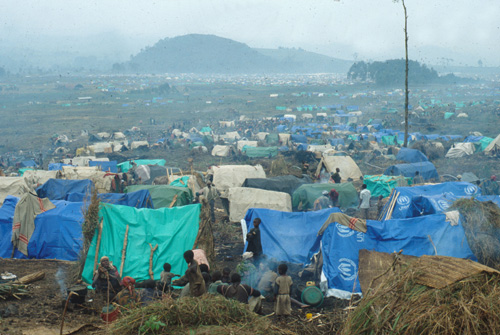
Kimbumba refugee camp in Goma, Zaire (1994)

Following the RPF victory, approximately two million Hutu fled to refugee camps in neighbouring countries, particularly Zaire, fearing RPF reprisals for the Rwandan genocide. The camps were crowded and squalid, and thousands of refugees died in disease epidemics, including cholera and dysentery. The camps were set up by the United Nations High Commissioner for Refugees (UNHCR), but were effectively controlled by the army and government of the former Hutu regime, including many leaders of the genocide, who began rearming in a bid to return to power in Rwanda.

By late 1996, Hutu militants from the camps were launching regular cross-border incursions, and the RPF-led Rwandan government launched a counteroffensive. Rwanda provided troops and military training to the Banyamulenge, a Tutsi group in the Zairian South Kivu province, helping them to defeat Zairian security forces. Rwandan forces, the Banyamulenge, and other Zairian Tutsi, then attacked the refugee camps, targeting the Hutu militia. These attacks caused hundreds of thousands of refugees to flee; many returned to Rwanda despite the presence of the RPF, while others ventured further west into Zaire. The refugees fleeing further into Zaire were relentlessly pursued by the RPA under the cover of the AFDL rebellion and 232,000 Hutu refugees were killed, according to one estimate. The defeated forces of the former regime continued a cross-border insurgency campaign, supported initially by the predominantly Hutu population of Rwanda's northwestern prefectures. By 1999, a programme of propaganda and Hutu integration into the national army succeeded in bringing the Hutu to the government side and the insurgency was defeated.

In addition to dismantling the refugee camps, Kagame began planning a war to remove long-time dictator Mobutu Sese Seko from power. Mobutu had supported the genocidaires based in the camps, and was also accused of allowing attacks on Tutsi people within Zaire. Together with Uganda, the Rwandan government supported an alliance of four rebel groups headed by Laurent-Désiré Kabila, which began waging the First Congo War in 1996. The rebels quickly took control of the North and South Kivu provinces and later advanced west, gaining territory from the poorly organised and demotivated Zairian army with little fighting, and controlling the whole country by 1997. Mobutu fled into exile, and Zaire was renamed the Democratic Republic of the Congo (DRC). Rwanda fell out with the new Congolese government in 1998, and Kagame supported a fresh rebellion, leading to the Second Congo War, which would last up until 2003 and caused millions of deaths and massive damage. In 2010, a United Nations (UN) report accused the Rwandan army of committing wide-scale human rights violations and crimes against humanity in the Congo during those wars, charges denied by the Rwandan government.

According to A. Dirk Moses and two other scholars, Rwanda as well as Israel are the main states citing a traumatic past "to challenge the injunction against violent territorial expansion" under the guise of preventing future atrocities.

=== Domestic situation ===
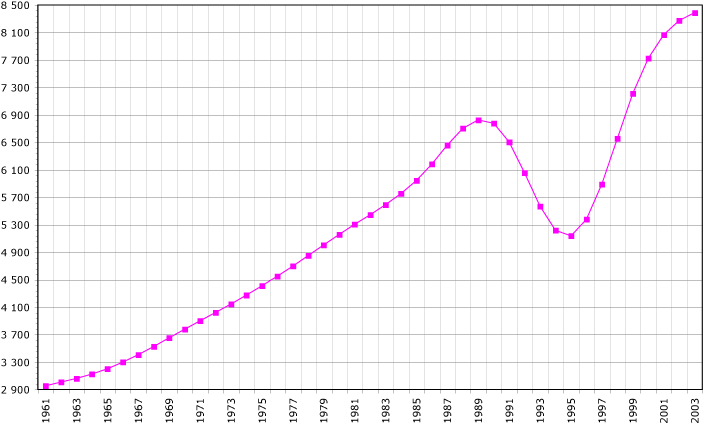
Graph showing the population of Rwanda from 1961 to 2003

The infrastructure and economy of the country had suffered greatly during the genocide. Many buildings were uninhabitable, and the former regime had carried with them all currency and moveable assets when they fled the country. Human resources were also severely depleted, with over 40% of the population having been killed or fled. Many of the remainder were traumatised: most had lost relatives, witnessed killings or participated in the genocide. The long-term effects of war rape in Rwanda for the victims include social isolation, sexually transmitted diseases, unwanted pregnancies and babies, with some women resorting to self-induced abortions. The army, led by Paul Kagame, maintained law and order while the government began the work of rebuilding the country's structures.

Non-governmental organisations began to move back into the country, but the international community did not provide significant assistance to the new government, and most international aid was routed to the refugee camps which had formed in Zaire following the exodus of Hutu from Rwanda. Kagame strove to portray the new government as inclusive and not Tutsi-dominated. He directed the removal of ethnicity from Rwandan citizens' national identity cards, and the government began a policy of downplaying the distinctions between Hutu, Tutsi, and Twa.

=== Justice system after genocide ===
The systematic destruction of the judicial system during the genocide and civil war was a major problem. After the genocide, over one million people (nearly one-fifth of the population remaining after the summer of 1994) were potentially culpable for a role in the genocide. The RPF pursued a policy of mass arrests for those responsible and for those persons who took part in the genocide, jailing over 100,000 people in the two years after the genocide. The pace of arrests overwhelmed the physical capacity of the Rwandan prison system, leading to what Amnesty International deemed "cruel, inhuman or degrading treatment". The country's 19 prisons were designed to hold about 18,000 inmates total, but at their peak in 1998 there were over 100,000 people in crowded detention facilities across the country.

Government institutions, including judicial courts, were destroyed, and many judges, prosecutors, and employees were murdered during the genocide. Of Rwanda's 750 judges, 506 did not remain after the genocide—many were murdered and most of the survivors fled Rwanda. By 1997, Rwanda only had 50 lawyers in its judicial system. These barriers caused the trials to proceed very slowly: with 130,000 suspects held in Rwandan prisons after the genocide, 3,343 cases were handled between 1996 and the end of 2000. Of those defendants, 20% received death sentences, 32% received life in prison, and 20% were acquitted. It was calculated that it would take over 200 years to conduct the trials of the suspects in prison—not including the ones who remained at large.

The RPF government began the long-awaited genocide trials, which had an uncertain start at the end of 1996 and inched forward in 1997. It was not until 1996 that courts finally began trials for genocide cases with the enactment of Organic Law No. 08/96 of 30 on 30 August 1996. This law initiated the prosecution of genocide crimes committed during the genocide and of crimes against humanity from October 1990. This law established the regular domestic courts as the core mechanism for responding to genocide until it was amended in 2001 to include the Gacaca courts. The Organic Law established four categories for those who were involved in the genocide, specifying the limits of punishment for members of each category. The first category was reserved those who were "planners, organizers, instigators, supervisors and leaders" of the genocide and any who used positions of state authority to promote the genocide. This category also applied to murderers who distinguished themselves on the basis of their zeal or cruelty, or who engaged in sexual torture. Members of this first category were eligible for the death sentence.

While Rwanda had the death penalty prior to the 1996 Organic law, in practice no executions had taken place since 1982. Twenty-two individuals, including Froduald Karamira, were executed by firing squad in public executions in April 1998. After this, Rwanda conducted no further executions, albeit it continued to issue death sentences until 2003. On 25 July 2007 the Organic Law Relating to the Abolition of the Death Penalty came into law, abolishing capital punishment and converting all existing death sentences to life in prison under solitary confinement. In parallel, the 2007 UN resolution presented and campaigns continued for a global moratorium on capital punishment.

=== Gacaca courts ===
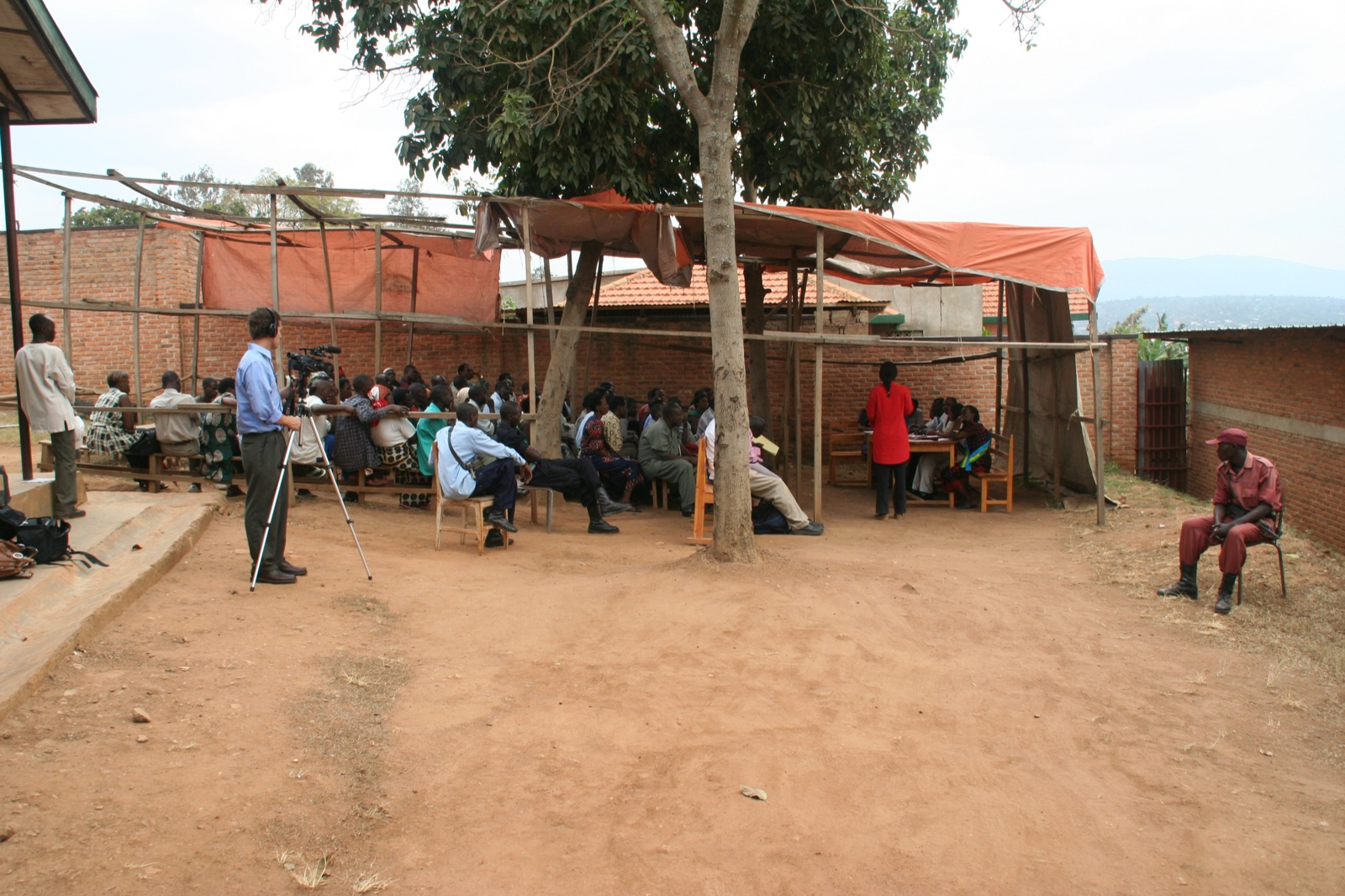
Gacaca

In response to the overwhelming number of potentially culpable individuals and the slow pace of the traditional judicial system, the government of Rwanda passed Organic Law No. 40/2000 in 2001. This law established Gacaca Courts at all administrative levels of Rwanda and in Kigali. It was mainly created to lessen the burden on normal courts and provide assistance in the justice system to run trials for those already in prison. The least severe cases, according to the terms of Organic Law No. 08/96 of 30, would be handled by these Gacaca Courts. With this law, the government began implementing a participatory justice system, known as Gacaca, to address the enormous backlog of cases. The Gacaca court system traditionally dealt with conflicts within communities, but it was adapted to deal with genocide crimes. Among the principal objectives of the courts were identification of the truth about what happened during the genocide, speeding up the process of trying genocide suspects, national unity and reconciliation, and demonstrating the capacity of the Rwandan people to resolve their own problems.

The Gacaca court system faced many controversies and challenges; they were accused of being puppets of the RPF-dominated government. The judges (known as Inyangamugayo, which means "those who detest dishonesty" in Kinyarwanda) who preside over the genocide trials were elected by the public. After election, the judges received training, but there was concern that the training was not adequate for serious legal questions or complex proceedings. Furthermore, many judges resigned after facing accusations of participating in the genocide; 27% of them were so accused. There was also a lack of defence counsel and protections for the accused, who were denied the right to appeal to ordinary courts. Most trials were open to the public, but there were issues with witness intimidation. The Gacaca courts did not try those responsible for massacres of Hutu civilians committed by members of the RPF, which controlled the Gacaca Court system.

On 18 June 2012, the Gacaca court system was officially closed after facing criticism. It is estimated that the Gacaca court system tried 1,958,634 cases during its lifetime and that 1,003,227 persons stood trial.

=== International Criminal Tribunal for Rwanda ===
Meanwhile, the UN established the International Criminal Tribunal for Rwanda (ICTR), based in Arusha, Tanzania. The UN Tribunal tried high-level members of the government and armed forces, while Rwanda prosecuted lower-level leaders and local people.

Since the ICTR was established as an ad hoc international jurisdiction, the ICTR was scheduled to close by the end of 2014, after it would complete trials by 2009 and appeals by 2010 or 2011. Initially, the U.N. Security Council established the ICTR in 1994 with an original mandate of four years without a fixed deadline and set on addressing the crimes committed during the Rwandan genocide. As the years passed, it became apparent that the ICTR would exist long past its original mandate. With the announcement of its closing, there was a concern over how residual issues would be handled, because "The nature of criminal judicial work ... is such that it never really ends." The ICTR officially closed on 31 December 2015, and its remaining functions were handed over to the Mechanism for International Criminal Tribunals. During its 12 years of operation, the ICTR indicted 96 individuals. Of these, the ICTR (or the International Residual Mechanism for Criminal Tribunals as its successor) convicted 61 individuals, acquitted 14, transferred the cases against 10 to national jurisdictions, halted the proceedings against 10 (two of whom had their charges dismissed, two had their charges withdrawn by the Prosecutor, and six died), while one indicted individual fled and has not yet been found and tried.

=== Censorship ===
Article 38 of the Constitution of Rwanda 2003 guarantees "the freedom of expression and freedom of access to information where it does not prejudice public order, good morals, the protection of the youth and children, the right of every citizen to honour and dignity and protection of personal and family privacy". This has not guaranteed freedom of speech or expression given that the government has declared many forms of speech fall into the exceptions. Under these exceptions, longtime Rwandan president, Paul Kagame, asserted that any acknowledgment of the separate people was detrimental to the unification of post-genocide Rwanda and has created numerous laws to prevent Rwandans from promoting a "genocide ideology" and "divisionism". The law does not explicitly define such terms, nor does it state that one's beliefs must be spoken. For example, the law defines divisionism as "the use of any speech, written statement, or action that divides people, that is likely to spark conflicts among people, or that causes an uprising which might degenerate into strife among people based on discrimination". Fear of the possible ramifications from breaking these laws have caused a culture of self-censorship within the population. Both civilians and the press typically avoid anything that could be construed as critical of the government/military or promoting "divisionism".

Under the Rwandan constitution, "revisionism, negationism and trivialisation of genocide" are criminal offences. Hundreds of people have been tried and convicted for "genocide ideology", "revisionism", and other laws ostensibly related to the genocide. According to Amnesty International, of the 489 individuals convicted of "genocide revisionism and other related crimes" in 2009, five were sentenced to life imprisonment, five were sentenced to more than 20 years in jail, 99 were sentenced to 10–20 years in jail, 211 received a custodial sentence of 5–10 years, and the remaining 169 received jail terms of less than five years. Amnesty International has criticized the Rwandan government for using these laws to "criminalize legitimate dissent and criticism of the government". In 2010, Peter Erlinder, an American law professor and attorney, was arrested in Kigali and charged with genocide denial while serving as defence counsel for presidential candidate Victoire Ingabire.

=== Survivors ===
The number of Tutsi survivors of the genocide has been debated. Different figures between 150,000 and 309,368 have been offered. There are a number of organizations representing and supporting these survivors of the genocide. These include the Survivors Fund, IBUKA and AVEGA. The 2007 report on the living conditions of survivors conducted by the Ministry of Social Affairs in Rwanda reported the following situation of survivors in the country:

Survivors of the Rwandan genocide
Category	Number of survivors
Very vulnerable survivors	120,080
Shelterless	39,685
Orphans living in households headed by children	28,904
Widows	49,656
Disabled during the genocide	27,498
Children and youth with no access to school	15,438
Graduates from high school with no access to higher education	8,000

=== Evaluation of the humanitarian response in Rwanda and the reform of the humanitarian system ===
The magnitude of the crisis exposed significant flaws in the humanitarian response to complex emergencies. Recognizing its implications, the Danish Ministry of Foreign Affairs proposed an unprecedented Joint Evaluation of Emergency Assistance to Rwanda. One of the four studies that composed it analysed the performance of the humanitarian system.

The study revelead key problems like the political vacuum of the international community to prevent and stop the genocide, and the use of funding for humanitarian aid as a substitute for political and military actions. It also suggested key operational recommendations to improve the quality of humanitarian responses in complex humanitarian emergencies, related to investment in crisis preparedness and early warning mechanisms, coordination mechanisms, technical standards, NGO performance, and overall accountability of the humanitarian system. These recommendations helped promote the adoption of the recently created Code of Conduct for Disaster Relief, and the launch of the Sphere Project to improve effectiveness and accountability of humanitarian action.

Other initiatives were also born at this stage, as institutional responses to overcome the failures of the humanitarian system. These included the creation of the Active Learning Network for Accountability and Performance in Humanitarian Action (ALNAP), the founding of the promoters of the Core Humanitarian Standard, and the transformation of the UN Department of Humanitarian Affairs into the current OCHA, giving birth to modern humanitarianism.

== Media and popular culture ==
=== Art ===
Chilean-born artist Alfredo Jaar travelled to Rwanda in August 1994 to witness the aftermath of the genocide. Jaar, sensing an urgent need to raise public awareness, began his 6-year-long Rwanda Project upon returning home. In an early work, Rwanda, Rwanda (1994), Jaar mounted four hundred prints with "RWANDA" repeated in bold lettering on backlit displays in public locations throughout Malmö, Sweden. Other notable works include The Silence of Nduwayezu (1997), in which a photo—the eyes of a young boy who had witnessed the murder of both his parents—was printed onto one million slides, reflecting the estimated number of deaths throughout the genocide.

=== Books ===
Canadian Lieutenant-General Roméo Dallaire became the best-known eyewitness to the genocide after co-writing the book Shake Hands with the Devil: The Failure of Humanity in Rwanda (2003) describing his experiences with depression and post-traumatic stress disorder.

In March 2024, Dorcy Rugamba's memoir dedicated to his absent family and as a gift to his children, Hewa Rwanda, une lettre aux absents, was published by Éditions JC Lattès. It was published in English as Hewa Rwanda, Letter to the Absent.

=== Film ===
100 Days, directed by British director Nick Hughes and produced by Rwandan filmmaker Eric Kabera, was the first film shot in Rwanda after the genocide, as well as being the first feature film about the genocide. No professional actors were used, instead featuring both Tutsi and Hutu survivors of the genocide as the characters in a fictional narrative. It was shot on location at the actual scenes where acts of genocide occurred. Kabera has also made documentary films about the genocide.

The critically-acclaimed and multiple Academy Award-nominated film Hotel Rwanda (2004) is based on the experiences of Paul Rusesabagina, a Kigali hotelier at the Hôtel des Mille Collines who sheltered over a thousand refugees during the genocide. In 2005, Alison Des Forges wrote that 11 years after the genocide, films for popular audiences on the subject had increased the "widespread realization of the horror that had taken the lives of more than half a million Tutsi". In 2007, Charlie Beckett, Director of POLIS, said: "How many people saw the movie Hotel Rwanda? [It is] ironically the way that most people now relate to Rwanda."

In 2005, HBO released the made-for-television film Sometimes in April, starring Idris Elba as a moderate Hutu who struggles to find closure a decade after the genocide. The film intersperses between the events of 1994 and the ICTR proceedings in 2004 and was shot in Rwanda.

Roméo Dallaire's 2003 book was made into the film Shake Hands with the Devil, released in 2007.

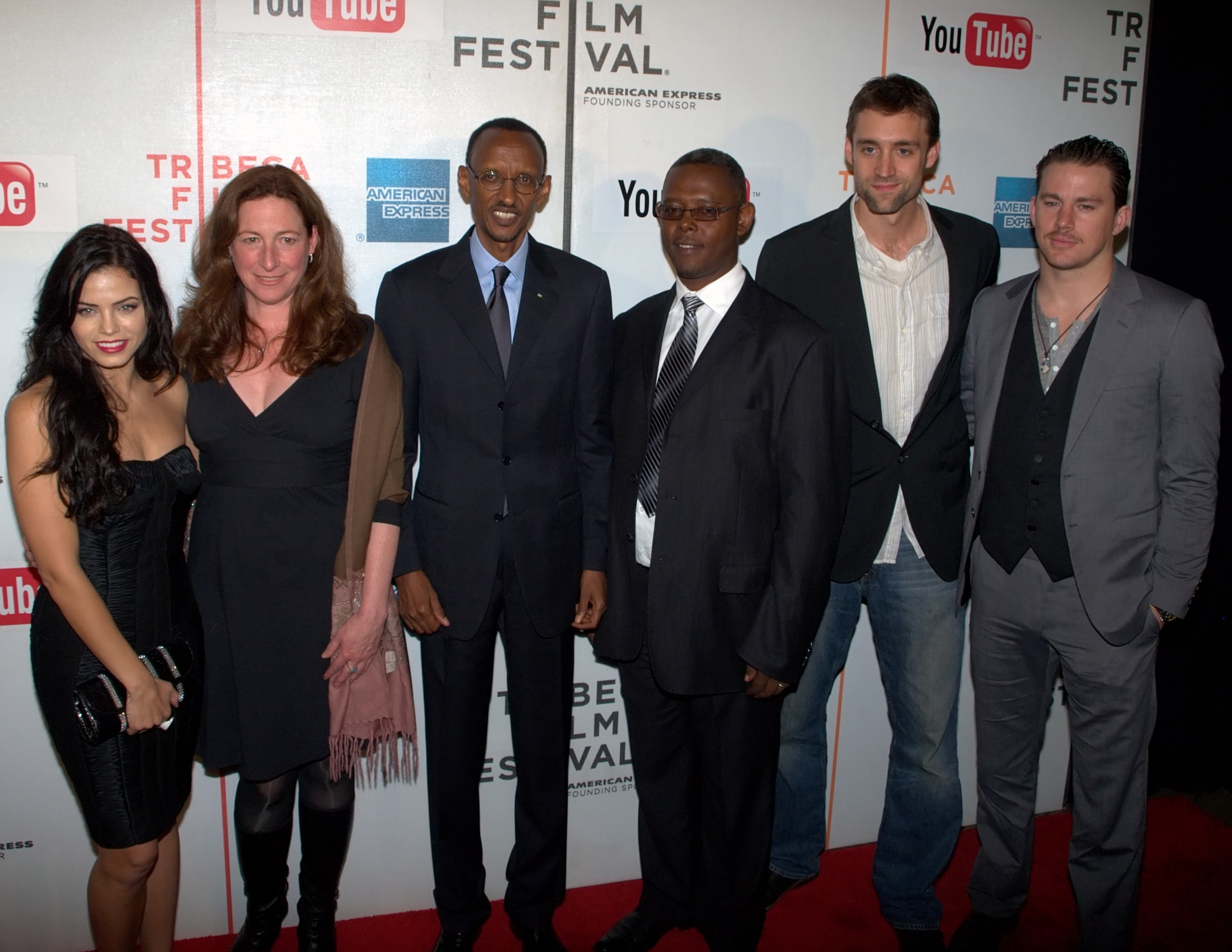
At the Earth Made of Glass premiere, Rwandan President Paul Kagame stands with, from left, Jenna Dewan, director Deborah Scranton, documentary subject Jean Pierre Sagahutu, producer Reid Carolin and executive producer Channing Tatum.

The independent documentary film Earth Made of Glass (2010), which addresses the personal and political costs of the genocide, focusing on Rwandan President Paul Kagame and genocide survivor Jean-Pierre Sagahutu, premiered at the 2010 Tribeca Film Festival.

Former journalist and United States Ambassador to the United Nations Samantha Power is interviewed about the Rwandan genocide in Watchers of the Sky (2014), a documentary by Edet Belzberg about genocide throughout history and its eventual inclusion in international law.

Ben'Imana (2026), set in 2012, is about the justice and reconciliation process in a Rwandan village after the genocide and won the Caméra d'Or at the 2026 Cannes Film Festival.

=== Theatre ===
In June 2024 Dorcy Rugamba presented a performance based on his book, Hewa Rwanda, in Braunschweig, Germany, as part of the Festival Theaterformen, and in October at the Théâtre des Bouffes du Nord in Paris. It was also presented at the Adelaide Festival in Adelaide, Australia, and several times as part of WOMADelaide, in March 2025.

=== Music ===
The song Papaoutai was released by Belgian-Rwandan singer Stromae in 2013, and was inspired by loss of the singer's father in the Rwandan genocide.

== Commemoration ==
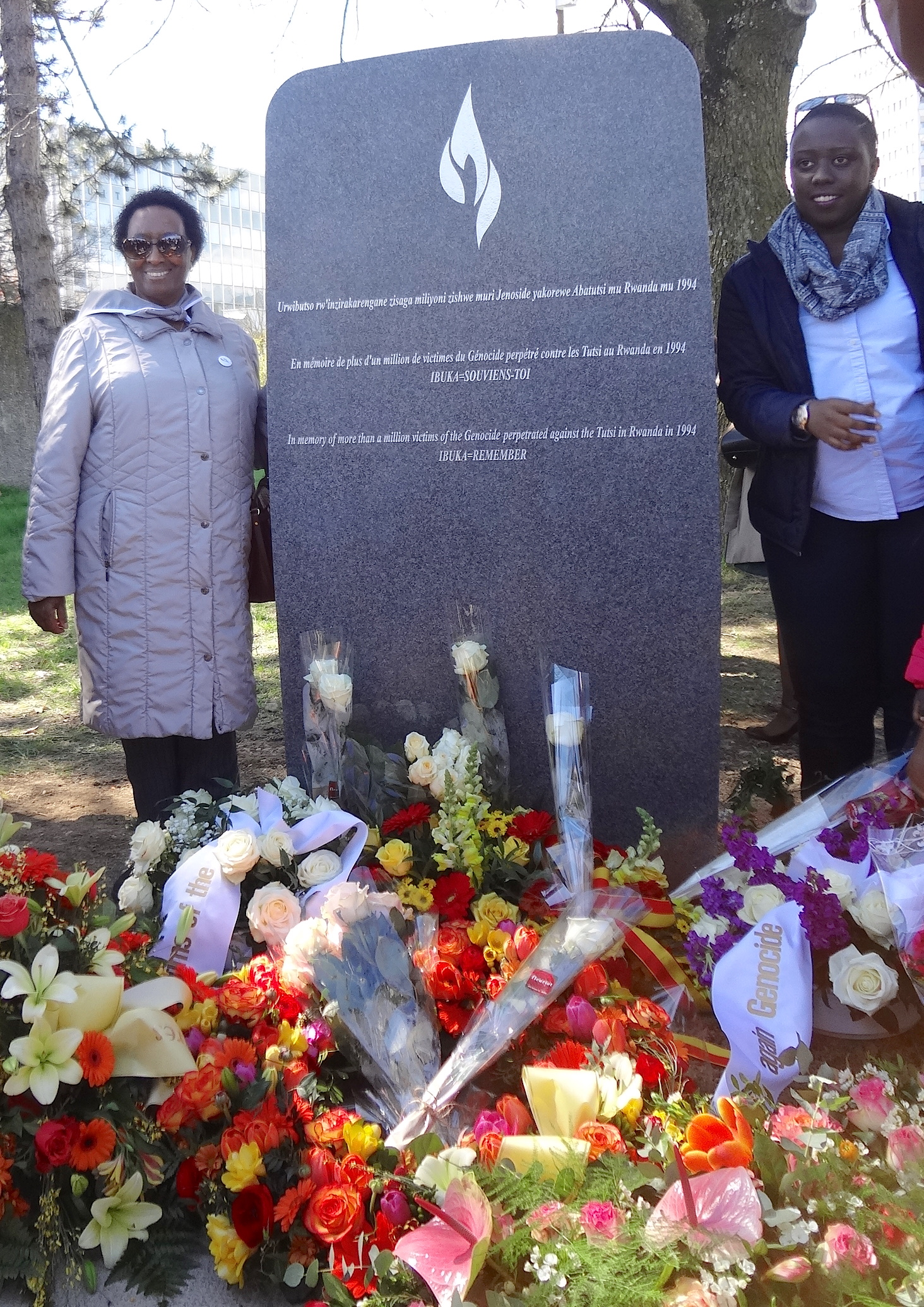
Rwandan genocide memorial in Geneva, Switzerland

In March 2019, President Félix Tshisekedi of the Democratic Republic of the Congo visited Rwanda to sign the Kigali Genocide Memorial Book, saying, "The collateral effects of these horrors have not spared my country, which has also lost millions of lives."

On 7 April the Rwandan Government initiated 100 days of mourning in observation of the 25th anniversary of the genocide by lighting a flame at the Kigali Genocide Memorial. Dignitaries from Chad, the Republic of the Congo, Djibouti, Niger, Belgium, Canada, Ethiopia, the African Union and the European Union attended. At the national level, the annual commemoration programs are known as Kwibuka and commence with an official week of mourning observed from 7 to 13 April, known as Icyunamo. During this period, work is suspended, and various events take place locally, nationally, and among the Rwandan diaspora across the globe.

== Maps of Rwanda ==
Ethnic distribution of Tutsis in 1983: 0% Tutsi • 45.5% Tutsi

Map showing the geographical strongholds of the Rwandan political parties at the beginning of April 1994: Unknown / vacant / partyless • MRND • MDR • PSD • PL • ★ Tutsi burgomaster • ★ Unclear / complicated

== See also ==
- Outline of genocide studies
- Kinsangani battle (1997)
- Rwandese National Union
