= Camp Kigali =

Military compound in Rwanda

Camp Kigali is a military compound in Rwanda, where 10 Belgian soldiers were killed on April 7, 1994, the day after the Rwandan genocide began.
