= Coalition for the Defence of the Republic =

Far-right Hutu power political party in Rwanda (1992-1994)

Coalition for the Defence of the Republic Coalition pour la Défense de la République
- Founders: Martin Bucyana, Jean-Bosco Barayagwiza, Jean Shyirambere Barahinyura
- Founded: 1992
- Banned: 1994
- Newspaper: Kangura
- Paramilitary wing: Impuzamugambi
- Ideology: Hutu Power
- Political position: Far-right
- Slogan: "Mube maso!" (English: "Watch out!")

Party flag

The Coalition for the Defence of the Republic (French: Coalition pour la Défense de la République, CDR) was a Rwandan far-right Hutu Power political party that took a major role in inciting the Rwandan genocide.

== History ==
The CDR was founded in 1992 and initially led by Martin Bucyana until his assassination on 22 February 1994. The party was allied with the ruling National Republican Movement for Democracy and Development (MRNDD), and used the slogan "Mube maso" ("Watch out!"), which meant that Hutus should beware or the Tutsis would rule them as they had in the past. Unlike the MRNDD, the CDR did not agree to the Arusha Accords and Statement of Ethics. It was therefore shut out of the Broad-Based Transitional Government. Jean-Bosco Barayagwiza, a founding member of the CDR, was convicted by the International Criminal Tribunal for Rwanda for several genocide-related charges other crimes against humanity. The CDR created the Impuzamugambi ("Those who have the same goal") militia, which took part in the killings.

The CDR refused to operate within the rule of law or cooperate with other Rwandan political parties it opposed. The CDR had a paramilitary wing, the Impuzamugambi that repeatedly provoked violent confrontations with members of other parties it opposed, by using hand grenades and bombs in such confrontations, and served as one of the death squads that massacred Tutsis in the Rwandan Genocide.

== Ideology ==
The CDR supported the principles developed by Hutu Power supremacist Hassan Ngeze's Hutu Ten Commandments. The Commandments called for the supremacy of Hutus in Rwanda, calling for exclusive Hutu leadership over Rwanda's public institutions and public life and complete segregation of Hutus from Tutsis, and complete exclusion of Tutsis from public institutions and public life.

The Commandments declared that any form of relationship between Hutus and Tutsi women was forbidden and that any Hutu who "marries a Tutsi woman", "befriends a Tutsi woman", or "employs a Tutsi woman as a secretary or a concubine" was a "traitor" to the Hutu people. It denounced Tutsis as "dishonest" in business whose "only aim is the supremacy of his ethnic group"; and declared that any Hutu who did business with a Tutsi was a traitor to the Hutu people. The Commandments declared that "The Hutu should stop having mercy on the Tutsi" and referred to the Tutsis as "common Tutsi enemy".

The CDR was opposed to democracy. It was rejected by other opposition parties as a legitimate participant, who claimed the CDR lacked democratic values.

== See also ==
- Rwandan Civil War
- Hutu Power
- Interahamwe, the MRND-D militia
- Kangura, Hutu Power publication
- Impuzamugambi, the CDR militia
