= Impuzamugambi =

Hutu militia in Rwanda

The Impuzamugambi (Note: sometimes Impuza Mugambi.) (Kinyarwanda: [imhûːzɑmuɡɑmbi], "those with the same goal") was a Hutu militia in Rwanda formed in 1992. Together with the Interahamwe militia, which formed earlier and had more members, the Impuzamugambi was responsible for many of the deaths of Tutsis and moderate Hutus during the Rwandan genocide of 1994.

While the Interahamwe was led by prominent figures in the ruling party, the National Republican Movement for Democracy and Development (Mouvement républicain national pour la démocratie et le développement, MRND), the Impuzamugambi was controlled by the leadership of the Coalition for the Defense of the Republic (Coalition pour la Défense de la République, CDR) and recruited its members from the youth wing of the CDR. The CDR was a separate Hutu party which cooperated with the MRND, though it had a significantly more extreme ethnically Pro-Hutu and Anti-Tutsi agenda than the MRND. The smaller Impuzamugambi was less organized than the Interahamwe, but it was responsible for a large portion of genocidal deaths. Alongside killings, both groups employed rape as a tool of genocide.

Like the Interahamwe, the Impuzamugambi was trained and equipped by the Rwandan Government Forces (RGF) and the Presidential Guard of Rwanda's president and MRND leader, Juvénal Habyarimana. When the genocide started in April 1994, the Interahamwe and the Impuzamugambi acted in close collaboration and largely merged their structures and activities, though some distinction was still evident in differences in their clothing. Some génocidaires participated with both militias in the killings of Tutsis and moderate Hutu. After the main period of genocide, members of both militias as well as large parts of the Hutu population fled from Rwanda to the west into the Democratic Republic of Congo.

Under the leadership of the CDR, Hassan Ngeze and Jean Bosco Barayagwiza were greatly responsible for commanding the Impuzamugambi. Both were found guilty in 2003 by the International Criminal Tribunal for Rwanda of planning and leading the genocide, incitement of genocide, and crimes against humanity. They were both sentenced to life imprisonment. The sentence against Barayagwiza was later reduced to 35 years due to a partial violation of due process. After deducting time already served, he would have stayed in prison for at least 27 years but later died.

== See also ==
- Coalition for the Defence of the Republic
