= Froduald Karamira =

Rwandan politician and convicted war criminal

- Born: 14 August 1947; Mushubati, Gitarama Province, Rwanda-Urundi
- Died: 24 April 1998 (aged 50); Nyamirambo Stadium, Kigali, Rwanda
- Occupation: Second Vice President of the Republican Democratic Movement
- Political party: Republican Democratic Movement
- Status: Executed by firing squad
- Conviction: Multiple counts connected to his participation in the Rwandan genocide
- Penalty: Death

Froduald Karamira (14 August 1947 – 24 April 1998) was a Rwandan politician who was found guilty of crimes in organising the implementation of the 1994 Rwandan genocide. He was sentenced to death by a Rwandan court and was one of the last 22 individuals executed by Rwanda, in April 1998. He was born to an ethnic Tutsi family, but "converted" to a Hutu as an adult.

== Political career ==
Karamira was born in Mushubati, Gitarama, Rwanda, into a Tutsi family. By following a Rwandan tradition, he became a Hutu. After his conversion, he gained in importance both politically and economically, owning several buildings in Kigali. Karamira became Second Vice President of the MDR party and was a leader in the extremist wing of the party, nicknamed "Hutu Power".

After the murder of Burundian president Melchior Ndadaye on 21 October 1993, Karamira gave a public speech during which he coined the concept of "Hutu Power". He called on Hutus "to rise [and] take the necessary measures", and to "look within ourselves for the enemy which is amongst us".

== Rwandan genocide ==
On 8 April 1994, after the death of Hutu President Juvénal Habyarimana when his plane was shot down, Karamira participated in the creation of the interim government. During the genocide, Karamira gave daily propaganda speeches that were broadcast on the Mille Collines radio station. After the Tutsi Rwandan Patriotic Front defeated the government in July 1994 and the genocide ended, Karamira disappeared from Rwanda. He was indicted by the government of Rwanda for genocide, murder, conspiracy, and non-assistance to people in danger.

== Extradition standoff ==
In June 1996, Karamira was arrested by Indian officials in Mumbai and was extradited to Rwanda. However, Karamira managed to escape from his guards in the airport of Addis Ababa, but was recaptured several days later. This was brought to the attention of Richard Goldstone, the chief prosecutor for the ICTR, who requested the Ethiopian authorities to send Karamira to the ICTR in Arusha instead. Although Ethiopia was obligated to comply with Goldstone under international law, Goldstone gave in after Rwanda threatened to suspend all cooperation with the ICTR.

== Trial and execution ==
His trial began on 13 January 1997 in Kigali. In addition to his daily speeches that incited genocide, it was claimed that he was instrumental in creating and arming the Interahamwe militias; he was also accused of being personally responsible for the killing of hundreds of Tutsis, including 13 members of his own family.

On 14 February 1997, Karamira was convicted on all counts and sentenced to death by firing squad. He appealed to the Kigali Appeals Court, but the appeal was rejected and his sentence confirmed on 12 September 1997. On 24 April 1998, in a public event at the Nyamirambo Stadium in Kigali, Karamira and several others were executed by firing squad for their involvement in the Rwandan genocide. A total of 22 genocide convicts were executed in different locations across the country.

Rwanda abolished capital punishment in 2007 after their almost festival-like executions were met harshly by human rights activists who fought hard to bring them to an end. The 22 people who were executed in 1998, including Karamira, were the last to be executed in Rwanda.
