= Hassan Ngeze =

Rwandan journalist and convicted war criminal

- Born: 25 December 1957 (age 68); Rubavu commune, Gisenyi prefecture, Rwanda
- Occupation: Journalist
- Status: Incarcerated in Mali
- Criminal charges: conspiracy to commit genocide, genocide, direct and public incitement to commit genocide; complicity in genocide; and crimes against humanity (persecution, extermination and murder) racism (ICTR-97-27-1 on 10 November 1999)
- Penalty: Life imprisonment, reduced to a 35-year prison term (28 November 1997 by the ICTR Appeals Chamber)

Details
- Date apprehended: 18 July 1997

Hassan Ngeze (born 25 December 1957) is a Rwandan journalist and convicted war criminal best known for spreading anti-Tutsi propaganda and Hutu superiority through his newspaper, Kangura, which he founded in 1990. Ngeze was a founding member and leadership figure in the Coalition for the Defence of the Republic (CDR), a Rwandan Hutu Power political party that is known for helping to incite the genocide.

Ngeze is best known for publishing the "Hutu Ten Commandments" in the December edition of Kangura in 1990, which were essential in creating and spreading the Hutu supremacist ideology that led to the Rwandan genocide. During the genocide, Ngeze served as an organizer for the Impuzamugambi militia, and is alleged to have personally supervised and taken part in torture, mass rape, and killings of Tutsis.

== Biography ==
=== Early life ===
Ngeze was born in Rubavu commune, Gisenyi prefecture, in Rwanda. He is of Hutu ethnicity. In addition to working as a journalist in 1978, Ngeze allegedly also earned money as a bus driver. By 1990, he was without training or experience in journalism.

=== Kangura, the "Hutu Ten Commandments" and RTLM ===
Ngeze was the Editor-in-Chief of the bimonthly Kangura magazine, which was initially intended as a counterweight to the popular anti-government newspaper Kanguka, and was financed by high-level members in the ruling MRND party of Hutu dictator Juvénal Habyarimana. Ngeze and his magazine had extensive links to the Akazu, the network of officials surrounding the President and his wife; this group included supporters of Hutu Power and the architects of the Rwandan genocide.

In December 1990, Ngeze published the Hutu Ten Commandments (sometimes called the Ten Commandments of the Bahutu) in Kangura, which made disparaging remarks about Tutsis in general and Tutsi women in particular. With the Hutu Ten Commandments, Ngeze revived, revised, and reconciled the Hamitic myth (Tutsis were considered by the Europeans to be a "Hamitic race" superior to the "Negroid" populations of Sub-Saharan Africa based on their having more Caucasoid facial features; that is, the idea that the Tutsis were foreign invaders and thus should not be part of the Hutu-majority country) and the rhetoric of the Hutu revolution to promote a doctrine of militant Hutu purity. The "Hutu Ten Commandments" were essential in creating and spreading the anti-Tutsi feeling among Rwandan Hutus that led to the Rwandan genocide.

In 1993, Ngeze became a shareholder and correspondent for the newly founded Radio Télévision Libre des Mille Collines (RTLM), which was largely a radio equivalent of Kangura. He was interviewed approximately eight times on RTLM.

=== Genocide ===
During the Rwandan genocide, Ngeze provided RTLM with names of people to be killed in his prefecture, which were broadcast on air. He was interviewed by RTLM and Radio Rwanda several times between April and June 1994, and in these broadcasts called for the extermination of the Tutsis and Hutus in opposition to the government. At the same time, Kangura published lists of people to be eliminated by the military and the Interahamwe and Impuzamugambi militias during the genocide.

=== Trial and imprisonment ===
Ngeze fled Rwanda in June 1994 as the country fell to the RPF. He was arrested in Mombasa, Kenya on 18 July 1997, and was sentenced to life imprisonment in 2003, by the International Criminal Tribunal for Rwanda. In 2007, the Appeals Chamber of the ICTR reversed some of his convictions, but confirmed others. It also changed his life sentence to one of 35 years' imprisonment. The charges of "aiding and abetting the commission of genocide in Gisenyi prefecture; direct and public incitement to commit genocide through the publication of articles in his Kangura newspaper in 1994; aiding and abetting extermination as a crime against humanity in Gisenyi prefecture" were upheld.

On 3 December 2008, he was sent to Mali to serve his sentence of imprisonment.
