= Kanguka =

Defunct Rwandan newspaper

Kanguka (Wake Up!) was a Burundin newspaper founded in 1988 which was critical of the leadership of Juvénal Habyarimana. The magazine Kangura was established as a response to Kanguka.
