= Kangura =

Racist magazine in Rwanda, 1990–1994

- The cover of the November 1991 issue of Kangura. The title states, "Tutsi: Race of God", while the text to the right of the machete states, "Which weapons are we going to use to beat the cockroaches for good?". The man pictured is the second president of the First Republic, Grégoire Kayibanda, who made Hutu the governing ethnicity after the 1959 massacres.
- Editor: Hassan Ngeze
- Categories: Political, Propaganda
- Frequency: Bimonthly
- First issue: 1990
- Final issue: 6 April 1994
- Country: Rwanda
- Based in: Gisenyi
- Language: French and Kinyarwanda

Kangura was a Kinyarwanda and French-language magazine in Rwanda that served to stoke ethnic hatred in the run-up to the Rwandan genocide. The magazine was established in May 1990, a few months prior to the invasion of the rebel Rwandan Patriotic Front (RPF), and continued publishing up to the genocide. Edited by Hassan Ngeze, the magazine was a response to the RPF-sponsored Kanguka, adopting a similar informal style. "Kangura" was a Rwandan word meaning "wake others up", as opposed to "Kanguka", which meant "wake up". The journal was based in Gisenyi.

The magazine was the print equivalent to the later-established Radio Télévision Libre des Mille Collines (RTLM), publishing articles harshly critical of the RPF and of Tutsis generally. Its sensationalist news was passed by word-of-mouth through the largely illiterate population. Copies of Kangura were read in public meetings and, as the genocide approached, during Interahamwe militia rallies.

== Support and connections ==
The journal was financed by military officers, MRND members and an intelligence agency of the government. Supporters included Lt.-Col. Anatole Nsengiyumva and Protais Zigiranyirazo, both later charged by the International Criminal Tribunal for Rwanda. Two language editions were published twice a month in batches of 1,500 to 3,000 copies. Some of the early editions were published on government printing presses. Due to the magazine's close ties with the government, it came to be viewed as a vehicle for the government of President Juvénal Habyarimana to test ideas, though Kangura did not hesitate to criticize the president over perceived concessions made during the negotiations in Arusha with the rebel Rwandan Patriotic Front (RPF). Kangura criticised democracy as sowing discord between Hutu and called for rallying around the MRND.

Kangura was key in fomenting extremism and, in turn, became the mouthpiece of the CDR upon its founding in February 1992. The CDR was an extremist offshoot of the MRND that campaigned for a "pure Hutu" nation and prohibited Rwandans with Tutsi grandparents from joining. While initially formed to give the MRND and Habyarimana deniability for the positions espoused, the CDR soon developed a life of its own. Roméo Dallaire, the Force Commander of UNAMIR, the United Nations peacekeeping force, would later refer to Kangura as "their [the CDR's] propaganda rag" and a "scurrilous extremist newspaper".

The extensive connections of Kangura to the ruling elite appeared to give the magazine inside knowledge. "People who might otherwise have ignored [the magazine] paid attention, because Kangura seemed to know what was going to happen before it did," stated Kenyan journalist Mary Kimani.

== Content ==
An article in the sixth issue, published December 1990, was the first publication of the "Hutu Ten Commandments", which decreed that Hutus who interacted with Tutsis were traitors. The propaganda of Kangura targeted women in particular, accusing Tutsi women of seducing Hutu in order to spy on them and mollify them, but only bearing the children of other Tutsi. Another article of December 1990 claimed that the Tutsi were prepared for a war. The back of issue six was a picture of French president François Mitterrand with the caption, "It is during hard times that one comes to know one's true friends."

An editorial in the 9 February 1991 issue stated: "Let us learn about the inkotanyi [RPF supporters] and let us exterminate every last one of them". In a November 1991 edition, Ngeze asked "What tools will we use to defeat the Inyenzi once and for all?" alongside an image of a machete. The March 1993 issue advised, "A cockroach gives birth to a cockroach... the history of Rwanda shows us clearly that a Tutsi always stays exactly the same, that he has never changed." Kangura further asserted that some who said they were Hutus were in fact Tutsis and that these individuals could be recognized because they "lacked commitment to the Hutu cause" and that the RPF had launched its 1990 invasion in order to reestablish the Tutsi monarchy and enslave the Hutus.

The writings of founder Ngeze in the journal regularly hinted at exterminations. In issue 54, of March 1994, Ngeze stated that the RPF had a list of 1600 people who they would kill if they ever took power and warned "the accomplices of the enemy are well known. Therefore the Inyenzi should have the courage to understand that they are making a slight error, they shall be exterminated."

Kangura also implied threats against Juvénal Habyarimana, especially after its funders moved from the MRND to the CDR. The December 1993 issue stated that a Hutu soldier enraged by the Arusha Accords would soon assassinate the president. The January 1994 issue predicted that Habyarimana would be killed in March.

== Aftermath ==
Kangura had stopped publishing by 6 April 1994, when the plane carrying Presidents Habyarimana and Cyprien Ntaryamira of Burundi was shot down over Kigali. This sparked the genocide. Over 800,000 people were killed, mostly Tutsis but including Hutu moderates who refused to take part in the massacres or attempted to protect Tutsi from the militias.

Hassan Ngeze, the founder, editor and accountant for Kangura fled the country as the RPF took control. He was arrested in 1997 and charged by the International Criminal Tribunal for Rwanda for his involvement with Kangura, as well as for his supervision of massacres in his home province of Gisenyi. His trial, grouped with that of RTLM co-founders Ferdinand Nahimana and Jean-Bosco Barayagwiza, was the first to establish that media organizations could be held responsible for inciting genocide since the 1946 conviction of Nazi publisher Julius Streicher. In 2003, Ngeze was sentenced to life imprisonment; Nahimana and Barayagwiza were also convicted.

== See also ==
- Der Stürmer
