= Bahutu Manifesto =

1957 Rwandan Hutu document on race relations

The Bahutu Manifesto (French: Manifeste des Bahutu) was a document composed by nine Rwandan Hutu intellectuals on 24 March 1957 for submission to the Governor of Ruanda-Urundi. Its full title was Note on the social aspect of the native racial problem in Rwanda (Note sur l'aspect social du problème racial indigène au Rwanda) and was ten pages in length. It denounced the supposed exploitation of the Hutus by the ethnic Tutsi.

This document called for a double liberation of the Hutu people, first from the race of white colonials, and second from the race of Hamitic oppressors, the Tutsi. The document in many ways established the future tone of the Hutu nationalist movement by identifying the "indigenous racial problem" of Rwanda as the social, political, and economic "monopoly which is held by one race, the Tutsi."
