= United Nations Security Council Resolution 1932 =

UN Security Council Resolution 1932
- African Great Lakes region
- Date: 29 June 2010
- Meeting no.: 6,349
- Code: S/RES/1932 (Document)
- Subject: International Criminal Tribunal for Rwanda
- Voting summary: 15 voted for; None voted against; None abstained
- Result: Adopted

Security Council composition
- Permanent members: China; France; Russia; United Kingdom; United States
- Non-permanent members: Austria; Bosnia–Herzegovina; Brazil; Gabon; Japan; Lebanon; Mexico; Nigeria; Turkey; Uganda

United Nations Security Council Resolution 1932, adopted unanimously on June 29, 2010, after recalling resolutions 955 (1995), 1165 (1998), 1329 (2000), 1411 (2002), 1431 (2002), 1717 (2006), 1824 (2008), 1855 (2008), 1878 (2008) and 1901 (2009) on Rwanda, the Council noted that the 2010 target for the completion of trials at the International Criminal Tribunal for Rwanda (ICTR) could not be met, and therefore extended the terms of 16 judges at the ICTR.

== Resolution ==
=== Observations ===
The Security Council recalled resolutions 1503 (2003) and 1534 (2004) which called for the completion of all ICTR cases by 2010. Earlier in 2009 the Council expressed its intention to review the terms of all trial judges at the ICTR, and expressed concern at the loss of experienced staff at the Tribunal. Furthermore, it noted that one permanent and two ad litem judges would leave before the end of 2010 upon the completion of their respective cases. The council was aware of the lack of co-operation by Kenya in the case of Félicien Kabuga and a later pledge by the country to enhance co-operation made at the Security Council.

=== Acts ===
Acting under Chapter VII of the United Nations Charter, the Council reaffirmed the necessity of the trial of those indicted by the ICTR and called for full co-operation from all states, particularly those in the African Great Lakes region, with regard to bringing Félicien Kabuga, Augustin Bizimana and Protais Mpiranya to justice. It also acknowledged that the Tribunal had to be adequately staffed.

The following permanent judges had their terms extended until December 31, 2012 or until the completion of their cases:

- Mehmet Güney (Turkey)
- Andrésia Vaz (Senegal)

The following permanent judges had their terms extended until December 31, 2011 or until the completion of their cases:

- Charles Michael Dennis Byron (Saint Kitts and Nevis)
- Khalida Rachid Khan (Pakistan)
- Arlette Ramaroson (Madagascar)
- William H. Sekule (Tanzania)
- Bakhtiyar Tuzmukhamedov (Russia)

The following ad litem judges had their terms extended until December 31, 2011 or until the completion of their cases:

- Aydin Sefa Akay (Turkey)
- Florence Rita Arrey (Cameroon)
- Solomy Balungi Bossa (Uganda)
- Vagn Joensen (Denmark)
- Gberdao Gustave Kam (Burkina Faso)
- Lee Gacugia Muthoga (Kenya)
- Seon Ki Park (South Korea)
- Mparany Mamy Richard Rajohnson (Madagascar)
- Emile Francis Short (Ghana)

Finally, the Statute of the Tribunal was amended concerning the election and appointment of ad litem judges.

== See also ==
- List of United Nations Security Council Resolutions 1901 to 2000 (2009–2011)
- Rwandan genocide
