= United Nations Security Council Resolution 1955 =

UN Security Council Resolution 1955
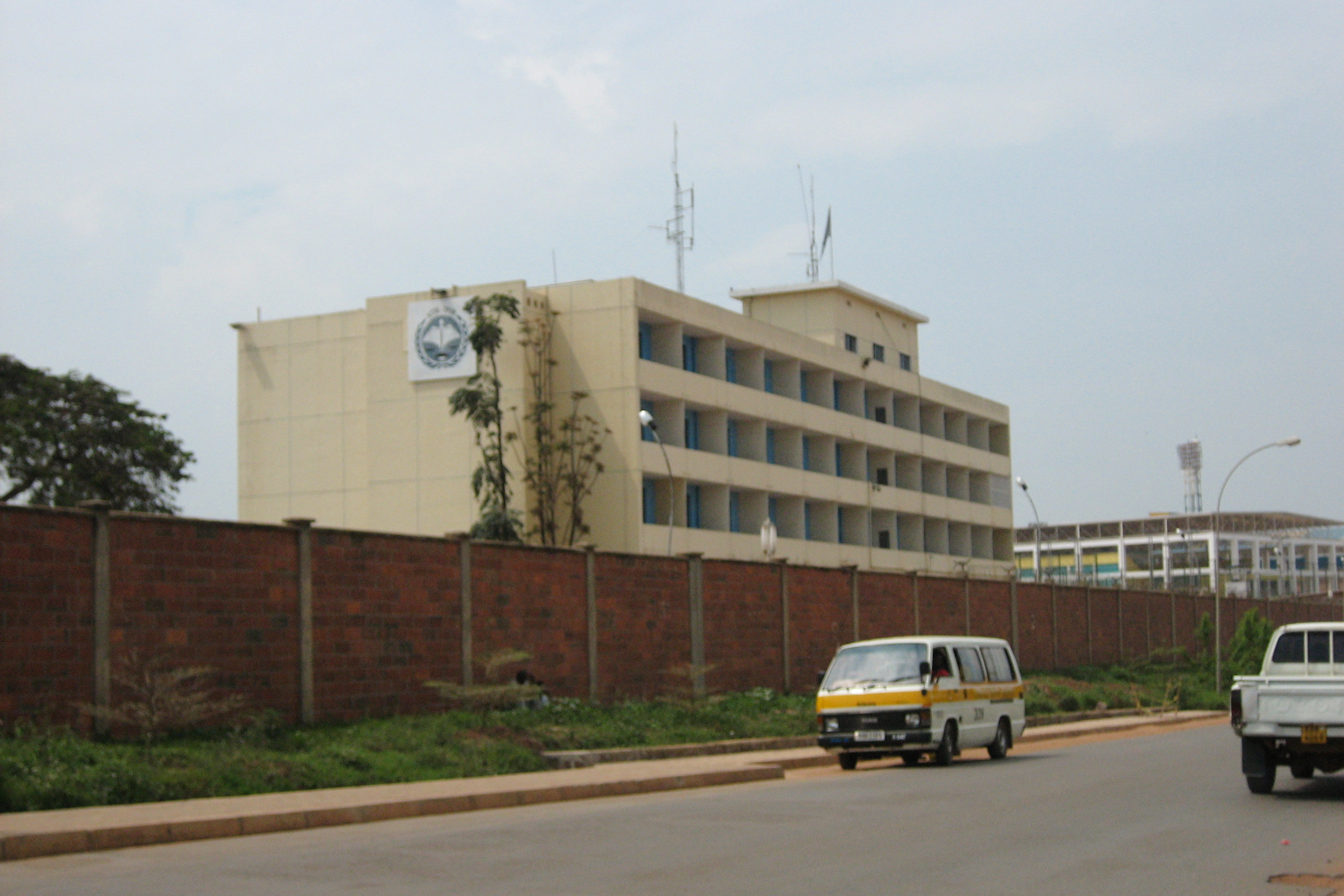
- ICTR building in Kigali, Rwanda
- Date: 14 December 2010
- Meeting no.: 6,447
- Code: S/RES/1955 (Document)
- Subject: International Criminal Tribunal for Rwanda
- Voting summary: 15 voted for; None voted against; None abstained
- Result: Adopted

Security Council composition
- Permanent members: China; France; Russia; United Kingdom; United States
- Non-permanent members: Austria; Bosnia–Herzegovina; Brazil; Gabon; Japan; Lebanon; Mexico; Nigeria; Turkey; Uganda

United Nations Security Council Resolution 1955, adopted unanimously on December 14, 2010, after recalling resolutions 955 (1995), 1165 (1998), 1329 (2000), 1411 (2002), 1431 (2002), 1717 (2006), 1824 (2008), 1855 (2008), 1878 (2008), 1901 (2009) and 1931 (2010) on Rwanda, the Council permitted three judges to complete their cases at the International Criminal Tribunal for Rwanda (ICTR) beyond their terms of office, and increased the number of temporary judges at the tribunal.

== Resolution ==
=== Observations ===
The Security Council recalled resolutions 1503 (2003) and 1534 (2004) which called for the completion of all ICTR cases by 2010. It noted however that the ICTR was unable to complete its work by 2010 and expressed concern at the loss of experienced staff at the tribunal, particularly as four judges were to be redeployed and one was to leave after the completion of their case. The Council was convinced of the necessity for appointing ad litem judges as a temporary measure to facilitate the completion of the ICTR's work.

=== Acts ===
Acting under Chapter VII of the United Nations Charter, the Council extended the terms of judges Joseph Asoka de Silva and Taghrid Hikmet in order for them to complete the Ndindiliyimana et al. case by March 2011, and the term of Joseph Masanche extended to allow the Hategekimana case to be completed by January 2011. It also reiterated the importance of adequate staffing at the ICTY for it to complete its work as soon as possible, calling upon the Secretariat and other United Nations bodies to address the issue.

Finally, the number of ad litem judges serving at the tribunal was temporarily increased from nine to twelve, returning to a maximum of nine by December 31, 2011.

== See also ==
- List of United Nations Security Council Resolutions 1901 to 2000 (2009–2011)
- Rwandan genocide
