= Accusation in a mirror =

Hate speech incitement technique

Accusation in a mirror (AiM) (Note: Also called accusations in a mirror or mirror politics) is a technique often used to incite hate speech, where someone falsely attributes their own motives or intentions onto their adversaries. Along with dehumanization, accusation in a mirror is one of the indirect or cloaked forms of incitement to genocide, which has contributed to the commission of genocides such as the Holocaust, the Rwandan genocide, the Armenian genocide, and the Gaza genocide. By invoking collective self-defense, accusation in a mirror is used to justify genocide, similar to using the right of self-defense to justify individual homicide.

The United Nations Office on Genocide Prevention (OSAPG) defines mirror politics as a "common strategy to create divisions by fabricating events whereby a person accuses others of what he or she does or wants to do", and includes it as a factor in their Analysis Framework on Genocide, which is used to assess whether a given situation poses a risk of genocide. Scholars such as Kenneth L. Marcus and Gregory S. Gordon have investigated ways in which accusation in a mirror is used to incite hatred and how to mitigate its impacts.

== Description ==
Accusation in a mirror is a false claim that accuses the target of something that the perpetrator is doing or intends to do. The name was used by an anonymous Rwandan propagandist in Note Relative à la Propagande d'Expansion et de Recrutement (French: "Note Relating to Expansion and Recruitment Propaganda"). Drawing on the ideas of Joseph Goebbels, he instructed colleagues to "impute to enemies exactly what they and their own party are planning to do". By invoking collective self-defense, propaganda is used to justify genocide, just as self-defense is a defense for individual homicide. Susan Benesch remarked that while dehumanization "makes genocide seem acceptable", accusation in a mirror makes it seem necessary.

The United Nations Genocide Convention defines genocide as "acts committed with intent to destroy, in whole or in part, a national, ethnical, racial or religious group, as such". The OSAPG prepares The Analysis Framework on Genocide which comprises eight factors used to "determine whether there may be a risk of genocide in a given situation". The fourth of the eight categories is the "motivation of leading actors in the State/region; acts which serve to encourage divisions between national, racial, ethnic, and religious groups". "Mirror politics"—defined as a "common strategy to create divisions by fabricating events whereby a person accuses others of what he or she does or wants to do"—is included in this category as one of five issues to be considered.

The tactic is similar to a "false anticipatory tu quoque" (a logical fallacy which charges the opponent with hypocrisy). It does not rely on what misdeeds the enemy could plausibly be charged with, based on actual culpability or stereotypes, and does not involve any exaggeration, but instead is an exact mirror of the perpetrator's own intentions. The weakness of the strategy is that it reveals the perpetrator's intentions, perhaps before it can be carried out. This could enable intervention to prevent genocide, or alternatively aid in prosecuting incitement to genocide. Kenneth L. Marcus wrote that despite its weaknesses, the tactic is frequently used by genocide perpetrators (including Nazis and Hutus) because it is effective. He recommends that courts should consider a false accusation of genocide by an opposing group to satisfy the "direct" requirement, because it is an "almost invariable harbinger of genocide". Marcus described AiM as a deceptively simple "rhetorical practice in which one falsely accuses one's enemies of conducting, plotting, or desiring to commit precisely the same transgressions that one plans to commit against them. For example, if one plans to kill one's adversaries by drowning them in a particular river, then one should accuse one's adversaries of plotting precisely the same crime".

In Atrocity Speech Law: Foundation, Fragmentation, Fruition (2017), Gregory S. Gordon—who had served as a Prosecutor in International Criminal Tribunal for Rwanda—discussed the tension between protecting free speech while regulating hate speech, citing that the use of accusation in the mirror as a form of hate speech is an indicator of violence. He said that the Nuremberg International Military Tribunal (IMT) "recognized straight away that Nazi barbarities were rooted in propaganda." (Note: Gordon 2017: "Related to this, the incitement decisions are decidedly under inclusive with regard to the techniques of incitement they identify explicitly. Only a narrow focus on strictly linear and explicit exhortations factors into the surface judicial findings. But other, superficially less apparent but equally potent, incitement techniques are often employed by conflict entrepreneurs. These methods—such as 'accusation in a mirror' (when the speaker accuses the intended victim of wishing to perpetrate the kind of violence the speaker is requesting of third parties) See (Marcus 2012)—can sometimes be read inferentially into court opinions, but that is all. This failure to provide a well-defined glossary of incitement techniques may also contribute to scattered, inconsistent, and potentially myopic jurisprudence going forward.") Gordon traced the early use of propaganda to the Armenian genocide in the Ottoman Empire during World War I. Gordon wrote that the "Young Turk government created the template for the modern genocidal propaganda campaign". International Criminal Tribunal for Rwanda (ICTR) and the International Criminal Tribunal for the Former Yugoslavia investigated the "atrocity-triggering speech in the former Yugoslavia and Rwanda".

=== Origin of the term ===
The phrase "accusation in a mirror" was introduced as l'accusation en miroir in a 1970 adult continuing education book by French social psychologist and author Roger Mucchielli. The book, Psychologie de la publicité et de la propagande, was written against the backdrop of the protests of 1968, and discussed the history of the social psychology behind publicity and propaganda. The book's intended purpose included deepening understanding of psychology and the human sciences, and increasing the reader's ability to recognize true values and to resist manipulation. In the conclusion of his book, Mucchielli likened his seminar to the work of Columbia University's professor, Clyde R. Miller, who established the Institute for Propaganda Analysis (IPA) in 1937, to educate others to be able to identify propaganda techniques in order to thwart them.

Mucchielli described accusation in a mirror as imputing to the adversaries the intentions that one has oneself or the action that you are in the process of enacting. Mucchielli explained how the perpetrator who intends to start a war will proclaim his peaceful intentions and accuse the adversary of warmongering; he who uses terror will accuse the adversary of terrorism. In this section in which Mucchielli describes accusation in a mirror, he referred to the work of Serge Tchakhotine who was known for his opposition to the Bolshevik regime (1917–1919) and who warned against the rise of fascism in Europe in the 1930s. Tchakhotine's work on how to resist propaganda, like that of Mucchielli, was informed by Sigmund Freud, Ivan Pavlov, and Frederick Winslow Taylor. Mucchielli also referred to the work of Joseph Goebbels, the Nazi Party's chief propagandist.

The description of accusation en miroir occurs in a single paragraph of the first chapter of the fourth unit, entitled "La propagande d'endoctrinement, d'expansion et de recrutement" ("The propaganda of indoctrination, expansion and recruitment"). (Note: Mucchielli 1970:79: "Cela consiste à imputer aux adversaires les intentions que l'on a soi-même, l'action que l'on est soi-même en train d'accomplir. C'est ainsi que celui qui a l'intention de déclencher la guerre proclamera ses intentions pacifiques et accusera l'adversaire de bellicisme,... celui qui utilise la terreur accusera l'adversaire d'utiliser la terreur. Les avantages de l'accusation en miroir sont nombreux. Outre l'auréole que l'on en retire a contrario, on enlève à l'ennemi ses arguments, on développe chez les auditeurs et les bonnes âmes la certitude qu'en face de tels adversaires, les honnêtes gens se trouvent en état de légitime défense, et chacun voudra être du côté de 'la juste Cause'. N.B.—Les accusations de mensonges décernées aux adversaires peuvent être facilitées lorsqu'on a commencé par injecter dans le public des informations mensongères comme si elles provenaient de ces adversaires. On aura alors beau jeu de démontrer le mensonge pour en accuser les pseudo-émetteurs. Comme l'a remarqué SPEIER, le langage de la propagande sera toujours celui de l'indignation: on glissera sans cesse du jugement de réalité au jugement de valeur".) Mucchielli included three other chapters in this section on the propaganda of agitation, integration, and subversion. The three main units preceding the one on the political use of propaganda include the first unit—a comparison between the psychology underpinning publicity and propaganda; the second unit examines publicity used by commercial enterprises, and the third investigates public relations.

== Nazi Germany ==
In 1925, eight years before his rise to power, Adolf Hitler concluded in his book Mein Kampf that Jews were planning to completely destroy Germany and the German people. Some authors say Roger Mucchielli attributed the mirror argument to Nazi propagandist Joseph Goebbels. In her work on dangerous speech, Susan Benesch defined accusation in a mirror as follows: "Claims that members of the target group pose a mortal or existential threat to the audience, aptly dubbed 'accusation in a mirror' ... The speaker accuses the target group of plotting the same harm to the audience that the speaker hopes to incite, thus providing the audience with the collective analogue of the only ironclad defense to homicide: self-defense. One of the most famous examples is the Nazi assertion, before the Holocaust began, that Jews were planning to wipe out the German people". The Nazi party opportunistically misrepresented the assassination of a German diplomat by Jewish teenager Herschel Grynszpan as evidence for a fabricated international Jewish conspiracy preparing a terror campaign against the entire German people.

== Rwandan genocide ==
=== Genocide strategy document ===
In the 1990s, a team of human rights activists working with Human Rights Watch, led by Alison Des Forges, found a mimeographed document in a Rwandan Hutu hut entitled Note relative à la propagande d'expansion et de recrutement, by an anonymous author. The document was a detailed description of Roger Mucchielli's 1972 analysis of the psychology underpinning propaganda, transforming his writing into a propaganda manual. Des Forges' work was "instrumental in assisting the International Criminal Tribunal in its prosecution of those responsible". Her description of accusation in a mirror was included in her book Genocide in Rwanda: the planning and execution of mass murder (1999) and in the posthumously published Leave None to Tell the Story: Genocide in Rwanda (2014).

The author of the memo proposed two techniques that would become commonly used in incitement of the Rwandan genocide. The first was to "'create' events to lend credence to propaganda", and the second was accusation in a mirror, through which "his colleagues should impute to enemies exactly what they and their own party are planning to do." The memo states: "In this way, the party which is using terror will accuse the enemy of using terror." The memo described how "honest people" can be made to feel justified in taking whatever measures are necessary "for legitimate [self-] defense". Des Forges said that accusation in the mirror was used effectively in the 1992 Bugesera invasion as well as in the "broader campaign to convince Hutu that Tutsi planned to exterminate them". While Rwandan officials and propagandists used both these techniques as described in the memo, Des Forges found no proof they "were familiar with this particular document".

=== Usage during the genocide ===
As part of their strategy, Hutu hard-liners had founded their own radio station (Radio Télévision Libre des Mille Collines, or RTLM). Des Forges described how "Rwandans learned from experience that RTLM regularly attributed to others the actions its own supporters had taken or would be taking. Without ever having heard of 'accusations in a mirror', they became accustomed to listening to RTLM accusations of its rivals to find out what [its own supporters] would be doing".

Léon Mugesera, a Rwandan politician convicted of incitement to genocide, was named in Des Forges's work as an example of accusation in a mirror. His inflammatory anti-Tutsi speech, which was reported in the Rwandan newspaper Kangura, was alleged to be a precursor to the 1994 Rwandan genocide. In 2016, he was convicted of incitement to genocide and sentenced to life in prison. Des Forges wrote that Mugesera and Kangura appeared to "have been implementing the tactic of 'accusation in a mirror' by connecting the Tutsi with the Nazis". She added that "copies of films about Hitler and Naziism" were allegedly found in the residence of Juvénal Habyarimana after he and his family left in early April 1994.

Andrew Wallis described accusation in a mirror as a "simple idea" but a "winning formula to win over the masses to participation and sympathy for the crime at hand". The technique, which "especially targeted journalists" in Rwanda, was a "direct and easily persuasive strategy to ensnare those who knew little about the reality of the Rwandan situation".

=== International Criminal Tribunal for Rwanda (IDRC) (1998–2007) ===
The International Criminal Tribunal for Rwanda (ICTR) 1998 ruling in The Prosecutor v. Jean-Paul Akayesu case considered testimony by Des Forges on "mirror politics", which included incidents of accusation in the mirror such as the 1992 Bugesera invasion. Jean-Paul Akayesu was a former teacher who served as mayor of Taba commune in Gitarama prefecture who was convicted of genocide for his role in inciting the Rwandan genocide. Trial documents described how mirror politics was used in Kibulira and in the Bagoguye region where the "population was goaded on to defend itself against fabricated attacks supposed to have been perpetrated by RPF infiltrators and to attack and kill their Tutsi neighbours". The document noted "the role that Radio Rwanda and, later, the RTLM, founded in 1993 by people close to President Habyarimana, played in this anti-Tutsi propaganda. Besides the radio stations, there were other propaganda agents, the most notorious of whom was a certain Léon Mugesera ... who published two pamphlets accusing the Tutsi of planning a genocide of the Hutu".

ICTR prosecutor Gregory S. Gordon said that the Akayesu judgement should have included a greater discussion of propaganda methods, saying the "anemic treatment of the range and specific characteristics of speech techniques (such as accusation in a mirror or predictions of violence) leaves it woefully underdeveloped and incapable of capturing the full range of liability inherent in atrocity speech". (Note: Gordon 2017: "The chapter also proposes a typology of incitement techniques to deal with incitement's under inclusivity problem. In particular, based on a wide variety of fact patterns involving hate speech that spurred ordinary citizens to slaughter their neighbors by the thousands, the chapter articulates why future decisions should explicitly recognize the following as potentially chargeable forms of incitement: (1) direct calls for destruction; (2) predictions of destruction; (3) verminization, pathologization, demonization, and other forms of dehumanization; (4) accusation in a mirror; (5) euphemisms and metaphors; (6) justification during contemporaneous violence; (7) condoning and congratulating past violence; (8) asking questions about violence; (9) conditional calls for destruction; and (10) victim-sympathizer conflation".)

According to a 2007 book co-published by the International Criminal Tribunal for Rwanda (IDRC) the University of Butare had a copy of Mucchielli's 1972 book, which has a paragraph on accusation en miroir in the unit called "Psychologie des propagandes politiques". The anonymous author referred to Mucchielli's "accusation in a mirror"—accusation en miroir.

In the International Criminal Tribunal for Rwanda's 2007 book The Media and the Rwanda Genocide, historian Jean-Pierre Chrétien described the psychology of those who perpetrated the mass slaughter of the Tutsi minority in Rwanda in 1994 by the Hutus by referring to Muchielli's book. Chrétien described the propaganda tools such as "accusations in the mirror" as "the mechanisms for moulding a good conscience based on indignation toward an enemy perceived as a scapegoat".

== Other uses ==
=== Turkey ===
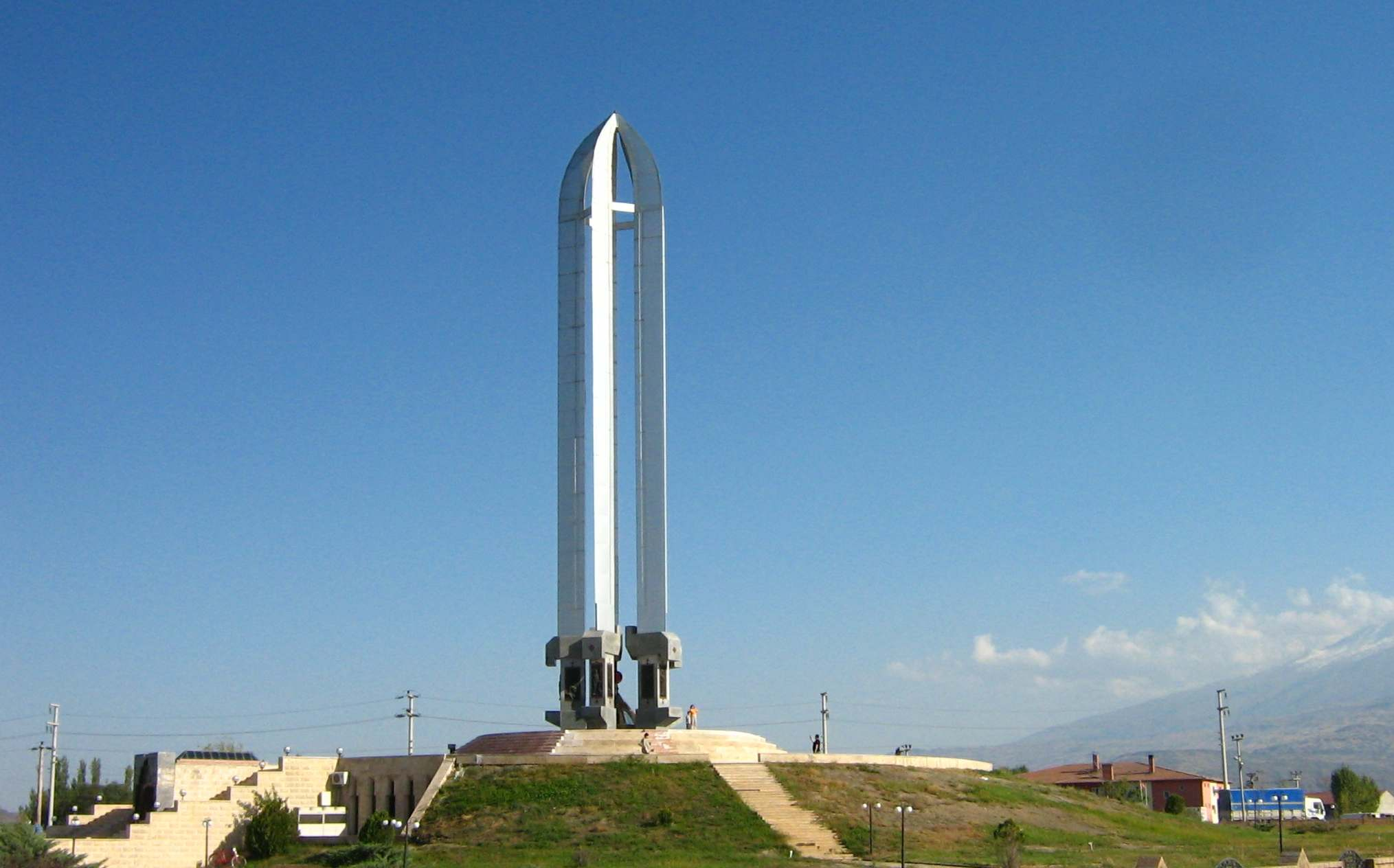
The Iğdır Genocide Memorial and Museum in Turkey

Gregory S. Gordon traced the early use of propaganda to the Armenian genocide in the Ottoman Empire during World War I. Gordon wrote that the "Young Turk government created the template for the modern genocidal propaganda campaign". The Iğdır Genocide Memorial and Museum in eastern Turkey, opened in 1999, promotes the pseudohistorical notion that it was Armenians who committed genocide against the ruling Turks, rather than vice versa. The more widely accepted view, outside Turkey, is that the Armenians were the victims of a genocide, carried out by starvation and forced relocation. These tactics have also been used as an act of genocide and war by others elsewhere. The Armenian genocide is recognised as such by 30 countries.

=== Azerbaijan ===
Multiple sources state that Azerbaijan employs mirroring tactics against Armenians in Armenia and Nagorno-Karabakh that that function to reverse allegations, blur responsibility, and frame coercive measures against Armenians as defensive, lawful, or reciprocal acts. Genocide Watch characterizes this pattern as “genocidal mirroring,” arguing that Azerbaijani propaganda labels Armenians "terrorists" and presents attacks as “counter-terror” measures while accusing Armenia of abuses that Azerbaijani forces themselves commit against Armenian civilians. The Lemkin Institute for Genocide Prevention presents mirroring as a pre-assault justification mechanism, writing that "propaganda of ‘Armenian provocations’ almost always predates an Azerbaijani assault." thereby recasting offensive action as retaliation. The organization has also characterized Azerbaijan’s tactic as DARVO (Deny, Attack, Reverse Victim and Offender). EVN Report states that mirroring functions to sustain a “both sides” narrative in international media.

=== Cambodia and Vietnam ===
In the book Blood and Soil: A World History of Genocide and Extermination from Sparta to Darfur (2007), American historian Ben Kiernan said that the accusation in a mirror propaganda technique had also been used in Vietnam and Cambodia.

=== Syria ===
Bashar al-Assad often accused his opponents of using chemical weapons and sarin gas that only he had access to, per United Nations reports.

=== United States ===
According to a 2019 article by the Southern Poverty Law Center, investigations on the rise of violence by far-right extremists had been "upended by conservatives who insisted the real threat came from the left". The article described how the Proud Boys often used the "rhetorical trick" of accusation in a mirror, by blaming "leftists and anti-fascist activists" for resisting their violence and asserting that self-defense by leftists was the real violence. In a November 2018 YouTube video, Gavin McInnes, the founder of Proud Boys, said, "We are under siege... We are threatened with violence—real physical violence—on a regular basis".

In 2024 and 2025, Donald Trump accused Federal Reserve Governor Lisa Cook of mortgage fraud and sought her removal from office, while he himself had been found liable for business and financial fraud in a New York civil case. Cook filed a lawsuit against Trump three days later accusing him of violating the Federal Reserve Act of 1913. Although a New York appellate court later threw out the monetary penalty in his fraud case for being "excessive", the finding of liability was upheld.

Additionally, in July 2025, Donald Trump claimed without evidence that the "Epstein files," documents related to the sex offender Jeffrey Epstein, were fabricated by his political opponents. In public statements and on social media, Trump accused former President Barack Obama, former Secretary of State Hillary Clinton, and former FBI Director James Comey of having "made up" the files, calling them a "hoax" and a "scam." These accusations were made despite the fact that the second federal investigation into Epstein, and his subsequent arrest on federal sex trafficking charges, occurred in 2019 during Trump's own presidency. Epstein was arrested on 6 July 2019, and the investigation was conducted by Trump's own Justice Department. Furthermore, it was reported in August 2025 that the FBI had redacted Trump's name from the Epstein files, citing privacy protections because he was a private citizen at the time of the initial investigation.

=== Russo-Ukrainian War ===
The Russian media's depiction of Ukraine during the prelude to the Russian invasion of Ukraine was "mirror image propaganda", CNN Moscow Bureau Chief Jill Dougherty wrote on 25 January 2022. For example, she wrote, NATO forces were described as "carrying out a plan that's been in the works for years: Encircle Russia, topple President Vladimir Putin and seize control of Russia's energy resources." On 7 September 2022, Vladimir Putin claimed that Russia did not "start" any military operations, but was only trying to end those that started in 2014, after a "coup d'état in Ukraine".

On 21 September 2022, Putin announced a partial mobilisation, following a Ukrainian counteroffensive in Kharkiv. In his address to the Russian audience, Putin claimed that the "Policy of intimidation, terror and violence" against the Ukrainian people by the pro-Western "Nazi" regime in Kyiv "has taken on ever more terrible barbaric forms", Ukrainians have been turned into "cannon fodder", and therefore Russia has no choice but to defend "our loved ones" in Ukraine. Putin also claimed that "The goal of the West is to weaken, divide and destroy our country."

Political scientist and espionage scholar Thomas Rid suggests the Ukraine bioweapons conspiracy theory may be a case of the Kremlin "accusing the other side of the thing they are in fact doing" (accusation in a mirror) based on historical precedent. In the 1980s, when the Soviets deployed chemical weapons in Laos and Afghanistan, Soviet-aligned press published disinformation alleging that the CIA was weaponizing mosquitoes. False Soviet reports blaming HIV/AIDS on the United States, commonly called Operation Denver, (Note: Referred to as "Operation InfeKtion" in the New York Times, and subsequently often called "Operation INFEKTION" in popular media about conspiracy theories.) also aimed to distract from contemporary Soviet bioweapons research. The Kremlin has a history of fomenting conspiracy theories about ordinary biology labs in former Soviet republics, having previously spread propaganda about Georgia and Kazakhstan similar to recent accusations deployed against Ukraine.

=== Gaza war ===
Human rights observers of the Gaza war have noted that Israel's justifications for its ongoing military campaign in Gaza, the attacks by Hamas on 7 October 2023, have become overwhelmingly disproportionate as justification for its actions. Chief among the justifications include indiscriminate killing of civilians and medical workers, and the use of starvation as a weapon. These actions lead to a United Nations special committee labelling Israel's methods as "consistent with genocide". Prime Minister Benjamin Netanyahu and others used the mirror argument to explain the intensity of Israel's retaliation to the 7 October 2023 attacks. In the face of mounting international pressure for a ceasefire, Israel has employed the "accusation in a mirror" tactic, both to justify its killing of Palestinian civilians specifically, implying that Hamas would act similarly had the roles been reversed, but also in response to international condemnation by accusing critics of Israel's actions as antisemitism, the weaponization of which is a tactic frequently employed by Israel and its supporters. The frequency with which accusations against Palestinians and Hamas in the Gaza Strip by Israel's public messaging have been attributed to projections of Israeli behaviour and attitudes towards Palestinians has given rise to the saying "every Zionist accusation is a confession".

== See also ==
- The Authoritarian Personality
- Big lie – Propaganda technique
- DARVO (deny, attack, reverse victim and offender)
- False accusation
- How Fascism Works
- Persecutory delusion
- Playing the victim
- The pot calling the kettle black
- Preemptive war
- Psychological projection
- Victim blaming
- Whataboutism
