= United Nations Security Council Resolution 1684 =

UN Security Council Resolution 1684
- Location of Rwanda in the African Union
- Date: 13 June 2006
- Meeting no.: 5,455
- Code: S/RES/1684 (Document)
- Subject: The International Criminal Tribunal for Rwanda
- Voting summary: 15 voted for; None voted against; None abstained
- Result: Adopted

Security Council composition
- Permanent members: China; France; Russia; United Kingdom; United States
- Non-permanent members: Argentina; Rep. of the Congo; Denmark; Ghana; Greece; Japan; Peru; Qatar; Slovakia; Tanzania

United Nations Security Council Resolution 1684, adopted unanimously on June 13, 2006, after recalling resolutions 955 (1994), 1165 (1998), 1329 (2000), 1411 (2002), 1431 (2002), 1449 (2002), 1503 (2003) and 1534 (2004) concerning the International Criminal Tribunal for Rwanda (ICTR), the Council extended the terms of 11 judges beyond their expiry dates in order for them to complete the trials in which they were sitting.

== Details ==
In the preamble of the resolution, the Security Council recalled that the General Assembly elected 11 judges in January 2003 to serve a four-year term at the ICTR from May 25, 2003 to May 24, 2007. Furthermore, three judges who resigned were subsequently replaced by the Secretary-General Kofi Annan in accordance with the ICTR statute.

In response to a request from the Secretary-General, the Council extended the terms of the following 11 judges until December 31, 2008:

- Charles Michael Dennis Byron (Saint Kitts and Nevis)
- Asoka de Silva (Sri Lanka)
- Sergei Aleckseievich Egorov (Russia)
- Mehmet Güney (Turkey)
- Khalida Rachid Khan (Pakistan)
- Erik Møse (Norway)
- Arlete Ramaroson (Madagascar)
- Jai Ram Reddy (Fiji)
- William Hussein Sekule (Tanzania)
- Andrésa Vaz (Senegal)
- Inés Mónica Weinberg de Roca (Argentina)

States with nationals serving as judges at the tribunal were called upon to ensure that they were available as permanent judges until December 31, 2008, so as to facilitate the completion strategy of all trials at the ICTR and International Criminal Tribunal for the former Yugoslavia (ICTY) by the end of 2008.

== See also ==
- List of United Nations Security Council Resolutions 1601 to 1700 (2005–2006)
- Rwandan genocide
