= Gitarama Province =

Former province of Rwanda

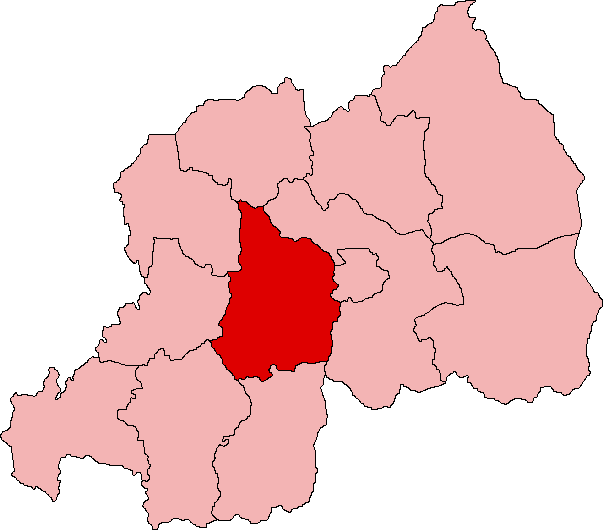
Map showing the former Gitarama Province in Rwanda

Gitarama was one of the former twelve provinces (intara) of Rwanda and was situated in the centre of the country, to the west of the capital Kigali. Gitarama Prefecture was created in 1959, increasing the number of prefectures of Rwanda from eight to nine. In 2002, it was renamed a province, as were the other prefectures of Rwanda. It had an area of 2,187 square kilometres and a population of some 851,451 (2002 figures) prior to its dissolution in January 2006. Gitarama was divided into 8 districts: Muhanga, Kayumbu, Kabagali, Ntenyo, Kamonyi, Ntongwe, Ndiza and Ruyumba; and two towns: Ruhango and Gitarama. Gitarama bordered the provinces Butare, Gikongoro, Kibuye, Gisenyi, Ruhengeri, Kigali-Ngali and Kigali City Tourist attractions included the Kamegeri rocks and the Busaga forest.

== Rwandan genocide ==
On 16 April, leaders of the Rwandan genocide began to move against their local opposition. Up to this point, key military officers, bourgmestres and prefects had opposed the outbreak of genocidal violence; some were killed, while others eventually yielded under political pressure and threats of violence. On 16 April several key figures were taken down including Marcel Gatsinzi, Army Chief of Staff of the Rwandan Armed Forces (FAR). Gatzini was promoted to general, along with Léonidas Rusatira, while Augustin Bizimungu took over as Army Chief of Staff; but not all opposition leaders lost their positions on 16 April.

The prefect of Gitarama, Fidele Uwizeye, was one of those who managed to hold on to his position. According to a 1999 Human Rights Watch (HRW) report, when the genocide began, many members of the Republican Democratic Movement (Mouvement démocratique républicain, MDR) had initially refused to participate. They saw the genocide as a power grab by rival political factions National Republican Movement for Democracy and Development (Mouvement républicain national pour la démocratie et le développement, MRND) and Coalition for the Defence of the Republic (Coalition pour la Défense de la République, CDR). Because the MDR refused to join the genocide, the MRND and CDR forces crossed the prefectural boundary of Gitarama as the violence spread outward from Kigali. Joseph Setiba led the Interahamwe militia, in attacks against the Taba commune and Runda. As militia members from the provinces of Kibuye, Gisenyi, and Ruhengeri also began to enter Gitarama, the people of the province attempted to repel them by force. Both Hutus and Tutsis, under Uwizeye's leadership, participated in the defense of Gitarama. The ranks of the militia continued to swell as the interim government relocated moved its base of operations from Kigali to Gitarama.

According to HRW, Callixte Nzabonimana, who was affiliated with MRND and local to Gitarama, publicly admonished the bourgmestre of Rutobwe for refusing to participate in the genocide by publicly slapping him. One former bourgmestre from Nyamabuye testified before the International Criminal Tribunal for Rwanda that the Presidential Guard and Interhamwe had swept through Gitarama "teaching the ideology of killing, of massacres. They incited the population to hate the local authority by saying that those who did not kill the Tutsi were accomplices of the Inkotanyi." (Inkotanyi is a pejorative word used by some Hutu as a slur for Tutsi people.)

On 18 April, a meeting was called by Uwizeye for the local leaders, which was reportedly also attended by members of the interim government including Nzabonimana, André Rwamakuba, Straton Nsabumukunzi, Eliézer Niyitegeka, Jean de Dieu Habineza and Justin Mugenzi. Jean Paul Akayesu, the bourgmestre of Taba, also attended this meeting.

Taken from "Killing Neighbors" by Lee Ann Fujii:

The Gitarama region was the founding place of Grégoire Kayibanda's Parmehutu, the party founded by Rwanda's first president. This region and the political elites involved, were also the source of much tension between the capital province of Kigali in the north, and the central and south province of Gitarama. This tension eventually played a role in the conflicts behind the Rwandan genocide. Page 48
