= Alphonsine Mukarugema =

Rwandan politician

- Born: September 25, 1953; Muhanga District
- Occupation: Politician

Alphonsine Mukarugema (born September 25, 1953) was a Member of the Parliament of Rwanda from 2003 to 2018. In 2025, she became president of the Association des Veuves du Genocide (AVEGA).

Alphonsine Mukarugema was born on September 25, 1953 in Muhanga District. She was educated at the Mushishiro Primary school and the Groupe Scolaire Notre Dame de Lourdes Byimana. She and her family fled to the Democratic Republic of Congo in 1973. She married Lazarus Nteziyaremye Migabo in 1977 and they would have four sons. She and her husband taught French and math respectively at a school an hour outside Kigali. In 1994, her husband and eldest son were killed in the Rwandan genocide.

She entered politics by serving as mayor of Muhanga District from 1999 to 2001 and the mayor of Kamonyi District from 2001 to 2003. The newly adopted Constitution of Rwanda reserved 24 seats in the Chamber of Deputies for women. In the 2003 Rwandan parliamentary election, Mukarugema successfully ran for one of those seats. In the 2008 Rwandan parliamentary election, she gave up her seat with the intention of allowing another woman to serve in Parliament and she successfully ran for an unreserved seat as a candidate for the Rwandan Patriotic Front. From 2009 to 2014, she served on the executive committee of the powerful Forum of Rwandan Women Parliamentarians. She did not run for election in the 2018 Rwandan parliamentary election.
