= Godeliève Mukasarasi =

Rwandan social worker (born 1959)

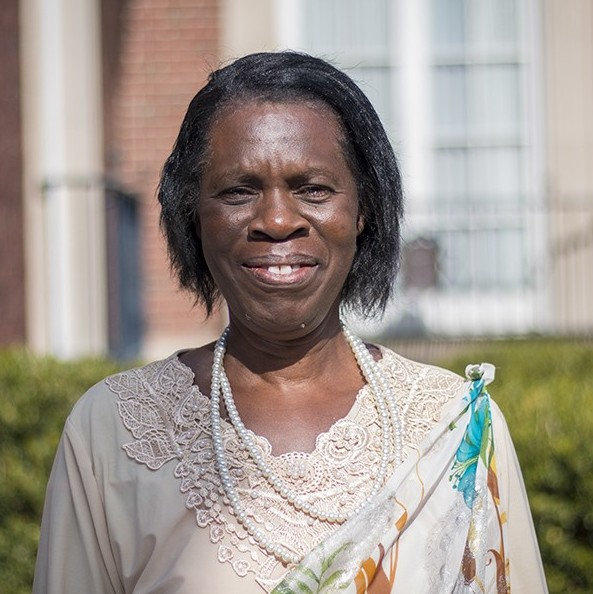
- Born: 1959 (age 66–67); Gitarama, Muhanga District, Rwanda
- Occupation: Social worker
- Known for: Work with genocide survivors
- Awards: John Humphrey Freedom Award (2004)

Godeliève Mukasarasi (born 1959) is a Rwandan social worker, genocide survivor, and rural development activist. She created the organization Sevota to support widowed women and their children after the genocide. In 2018, she was given an International Women of Courage award for her work.

== Background and activism ==
Mukasarasi was born in Gitarama, Muhanga District, where she went on to work as a social worker. Following the 1994 Rwandan genocide, she founded a group called SEVOTA, a support group to help widows and orphans to further their socio-economic rights. The organization emphasizes creation of "safe spaces" for survivor dialogues and physical recreation for children, and is based in the Taba commune.

In 1996, her husband, Emmanuel Rudasingwa, and daughter were killed by an armed band. In her testimony to human rights investigators, Mukasarasi attributed the attack to Hutus recently returned from Zaire, in retaliation for her husband's conversations with representatives of the International Criminal Tribunal for Rwanda. Mukasarasi was intimidated, but she found four people who were willing to testify. She was given an International Women of Courage Award in 2018 for this and other work.

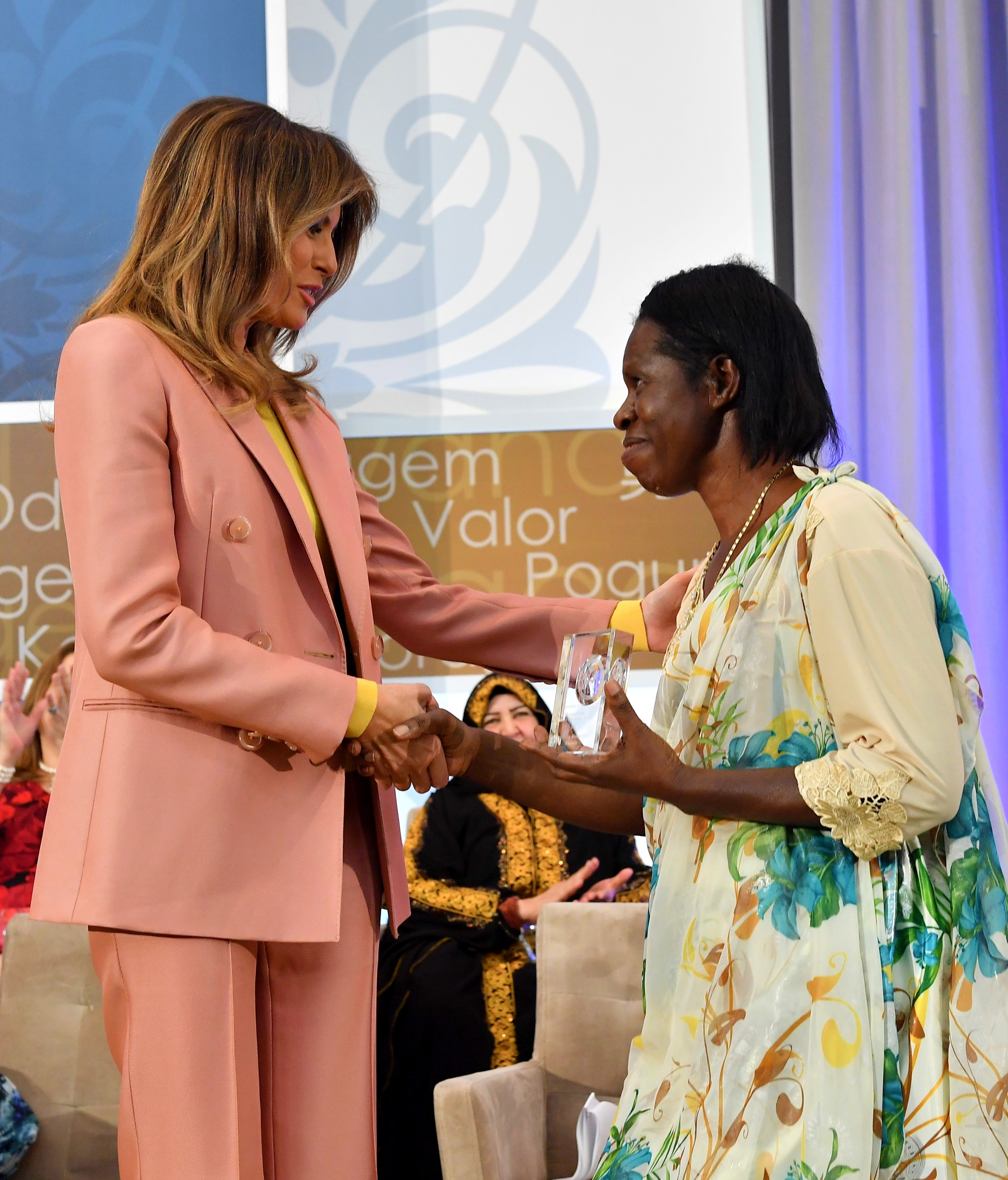
Mukasarasi with Melania Trump at the 2018 International Women of Courage Award

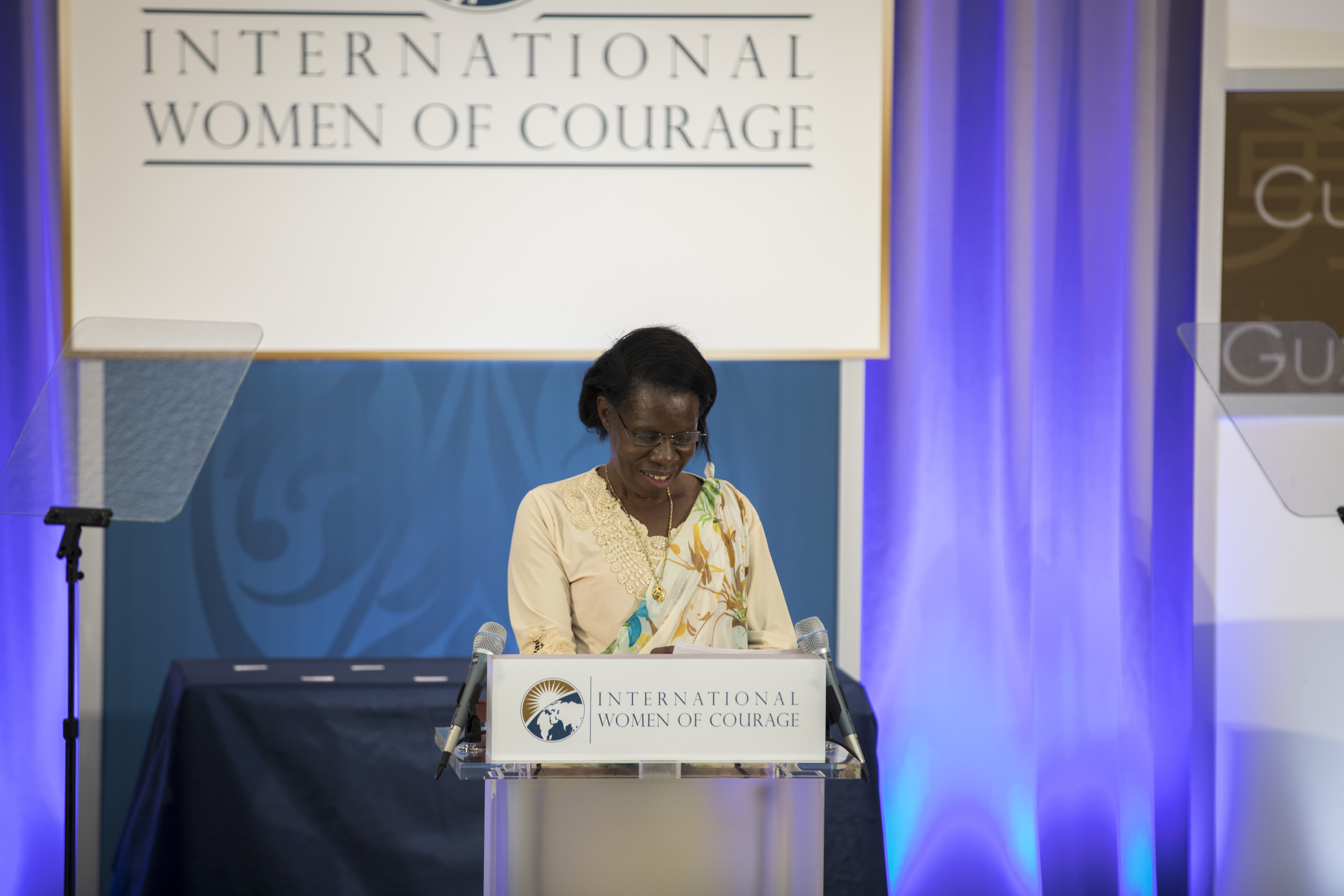
2018 International Women of Courage

== Recognition ==
Mukasarasi's work has won other national and international awards. In October 1996, she was given the Prize for Women's Creativity in Rural Life from the Women's World Summit Foundation, and she has also received the Nzambazamariya Vénéranda Award, a Rwandan prize for an individual promoting a positive image for women. In 2004, she was awarded the John Humphrey Freedom Award of the International Centre for Human Rights and Democratic Development, which came with a cash grant of C$30,000 and allowed Mukasarasi to go on a speaking tour of Canadian cities to promote her work. Kathleen Mahoney, the chairperson of the centre's board, stated in a press release that “through her courage, her enthusiasm and her unwavering commitment, [Mukasarasi] has succeeded in gaining the trust of victims of rape and sexual violence, particularly women who contracted HIV-AIDS, as well as in breaking the silence and in helping these women obtain justice."

Odina Desrochers praised Mukasarasi in the House of Commons of Canada on behalf of the Bloc Québécois for her "key role in breaking the silence and documenting crimes of sexual violence for the International Criminal Tribunal for Rwanda."
