= Every accusation is a confession =

== See also ==
- Accusation in a mirror
