= United Nations Security Council Resolution 1717 =

UN Security Council Resolution 1717
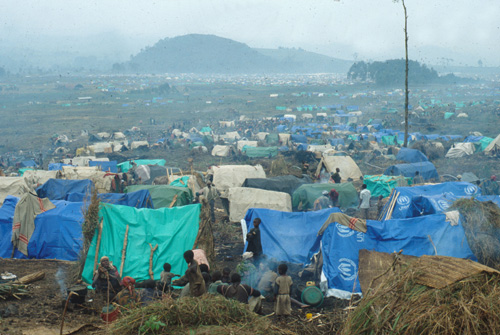
- Rwandan refugee camp in eastern Democratic Republic of the Congo
- Date: 13 October 2006
- Meeting no.: 5,550
- Code: S/RES/1717 (Document)
- Subject: International Criminal Tribunal for Rwanda
- Voting summary: 15 voted for; None voted against; None abstained
- Result: Adopted

Security Council composition
- Permanent members: China; France; Russia; United Kingdom; United States
- Non-permanent members: Argentina; Rep. of the Congo; Denmark; Ghana; Greece; Japan; Peru; Qatar; Slovakia; Tanzania

United Nations Security Council Resolution 1717 was adopted unanimously on October 13, 2006; after recalling resolutions 955 (1995), 1165 (1998), 1329 (2000), 1411 (2002), 1431 (2002), 1449 (2002), 1503 (2003) and 1534 (2004) on Rwanda, the Council extended the terms of temporary judges at the International Criminal Tribunal for Rwanda (ICTR).

== Resolution ==
=== Observations ===
The Council recalled that 18 temporary judges were elected to the ICTR by the United Nations General Assembly on June 25, 2003. It also recalled Resolution 1684 (2006) that extended the terms of permanent judges serving at the ICTR.

=== Acts ===
The following 18 ad litem judges had their terms extended until December 31, 2008:

- Aydin Sefa Akay (Turkey)
- Florence Rita Arrey (Cameroon)
- Solomy Balungi Bossa (Uganda)
- Robert Fremr (Czech Republic)
- Taghrid Hikmet (Jordan)
- Karin Hökborg (Sweden)
- Vagn Joensen (Denmark)
- Gberdao Gustave Kam (Burkina Faso)
- Flavia Lattanzi (Italy)
- Kenneth Machin (United Kingdom)
- Joseph Edward Chiondo Masanche (Tanzania)
- Tan Sri Dato’ Hj. Mohd. Azmi Dato’ Hj. Kamaruddin (Malaysia)
- Lee Gacuiga Muthoga (Kenya)
- Seon Ki Park (South Korea)
- Mparany Mamy Richard Rajohnson (Madagascar)
- Emile Francis Short (Ghana)
- Albertus Henricus Johannes Swart (Netherlands)
- Aura E. Guerra de Villalaz (Panama)

States were requested to ensure that their nationals serving as judges at the ICTR were available to serve until December 31, 2008.

== See also ==
- List of United Nations Security Council Resolutions 1701 to 1800 (2006–2008)
- Rwandan genocide
