= Ildephonse Hategekimana =

Rwandan soldier (born 1964)

Ildéphonse Hategekimana
- Born: February 1, 1964 (age 62); Mugina, Gitarama Rwanda
- Allegiance: Rwanda

Ildéphonse Hategekimana (born 1 February 1964) is a Rwandan soldier who participated in the Rwandan genocide.

An ethnic Hutu, Hategekimana was born on 1 February 1964 in Mugina commune in Gitarama prefecture. In 1994, he held the rank of lieutenant in the Rwandan Armed Forces, and was the commander of the Ngoma camp in Butare prefecture.

On 27 November 2000, the International Criminal Tribunal for Rwanda (ICTR) issued an indictment against Hategekimana, charging him with "genocide, or in the alternative complicity in genocide, direct and public incitement to commit genocide, and crimes against humanity."

Hategekimana was the chief of security in a Rwandan refugee camp in Loukoléla in Congo-Brazzaville for some years prior to his arrest. He lived with his wife there and was a respected leader living under the alias "Isidore Balihafi".

Hategekimana was arrested in the Republic of Congo on 16 February 2003, and then transferred to the ICTR. He was convicted of three counts of genocide and one count of crimes against humanity and sentenced to life imprisonment by the ICTR on 6 December 2010. The conviction was upheld by the Appeals Chamber on 8 May 2012.
