= United Nations Security Council Resolution 1449 =

UN Security Council Resolution 1449
- Rwanda
- Date: 13 December 2002
- Meeting no.: 4,666
- Code: S/RES/1449 (Document)
- Subject: The International Criminal Tribunal for Rwanda
- Voting summary: 15 voted for; None voted against; None abstained
- Result: Adopted

Security Council composition
- Permanent members: China; France; Russia; United Kingdom; United States
- Non-permanent members: Bulgaria; Cameroon; Colombia; Guinea; Ireland; Mauritius; Mexico; Norway; Singapore; Syria

United Nations Security Council resolution 1449, adopted unanimously on 13 December 2002, after recalling resolutions 955 (1994), 1165 (1998), 1329 (2000), 1411 (2002) and 1431 (2002), the Council forwarded a list of nominees for permanent judges at the International Criminal Tribunal for Rwanda (ICTR) to the General Assembly for consideration.

The list of nominees received by the Secretary-General Kofi Annan was as follows:

- Mansoor Ahmad (Pakistan)
- Teimuraz Bakradze (Georgia)
- Kocou Arsène Capo-Chichi (Benin)
- Frederick Mwela Chomba (Zambia)
- Pavel Dolene (Slovenia)
- Serguei Aleckseievich Egorov (Russia)
- Robert Fremr (Czech Republic)
- Asoka de Zoysa Gunawardana (Sri Lanka)
- Mehmet Güney (Turkey)
- Michel Mahouve (Cameroon)
- Winston Churchill Matanzima Maqutu (Lesotho)
- Erik Møse (Norway)
- Arlette Ramaroson (Madagascar)
- Jai Ram Reddy (Fiji)
- William Hussoin Sekule (Tanzania)
- Emile Francis Short (Ghana)
- Francis M. Ssekandi (Uganda)
- Cheick Traoré (Mali)
- Xenofon Ulianovschi (Moldova)
- Andrésia Vaz (Senegal)
- Inés Mónica Weinberg de Roca (Argentina)
- Mohammed Ibrahim Werfalli (Libya)
- Lloyd George Williams (Saint Kitts and Nevis)

== See also ==
- List of United Nations Security Council Resolutions 1401 to 1500 (2002–2003)
- Rwandan genocide
