= Shyogwe (sector) =

Coordinates: 2°06′S 29°46′E

- Sector
- Interactive map of Shyogwe
- Country: Rwanda
- Province: Southern Province
- District: Muhanga District

Area
  - Sector: 36.02 km^{2} (13.91 sq mi)

Population (2022 census)
  - Sector: 50,966
  - Density: 1,415/km^{2} (3,665/sq mi)
  - Urban: 33,573

Shyogwe is a sector in Muhanga District, Southern Province in Rwanda, with a population of 50,966 (2022 census) and an area of 36.02 square kilometers. The eastern part of the district capital Muhanga is located within the sector.
