= Chantal Kabasinga =

Rwandan politician

- Born: Gicumbi District
- Occupation(s): Politician, president of the Association of Widows of Genocide

Chantal Kabasinga is a Rwandan politician and the president of the Association of Widows of Genocide in Rwanda.

== Early life ==
Kabasinga was born in Gicumbi District in the Northern Province.

== Rwandan genocide ==
Kabasinga's husband, a Tutsi, was killed in 1994 Rwandan genocide, Kabasinga and her 18-month-old daughter survived.

== Career ==
As of 2012, Kabasinga was serving her second term as the president of Avega Agahozo, (Association des Veuves du Genocide Agahozo in French and Association of Widows of the Genocide in English) in Rwanda after having first been elected in 2008. She also worked as an advisor at the Ruhuka Trauma Center in Kigali. In 2011, in her role as president, she denounced Lantos Foundation for its decision to give a human rights prize to Paul Rusesabagina.

Kabasinga is a member of the Rwanda Patriotic Front and served as a member of parliament in the late 2010s. She ran for the Rwandan senate in 2019.

== See also ==
- Politics of Rwanda
