= Association des Veuves du Genocide =

Rwandan philanthropic association

Association des Veuves du Genocide (AVEGA Agahozo) or the Association of Widows of Genocide is a Rwandan association formed to help widows, orphans and others who lost family members in the 1994 Rwandan genocide. AVEGA was founded in October 1995 by 50 women who had survived the killings but lost their husbands. One of the organization's founders has stated that she believes that "too much is expected of the victims" who, in her view, need first to be reconciled with themselves and their losses. Restitution and reparations are essential prerequisites before any consideration of reconciliation with the perpetrators.

The organisation aims to do the following:

- To protect and promote the widows of the genocide, who have been severely tested by the atrocities they have suffered
- To undertake activities aiming to improve the living conditions of the widows and their children
- To promote solidarity between the members of the association
- To promote the education of the orphans of the genocide
- To defend the rights of the widows, be they social, economic, political or of any other kind
- To perpetuate the memory of the victims of the genocide and to fight for justice to be done
- To take an active part in the process of national reconciliation and the rebuilding of the country
- To collaborate with national and international associations that share the same objectives.

== National Presidents ==
- Alphonsine Mukarugema (since 2025)
- Valerie Mukabayire (term 2014)
- Chantal Kabasinga (terms 2008, 2012)
- Bellancille Umukobwa (term 2006)
- Chantal Kayitesi (term 1996)
