= Rutobwe =

Commune in Gitarama, Rwanda

Rutobwe Commune
- Interactive map of Rutobwe Commune
- Coordinates: 1°59′03″S 29°47′51″E
- Country: Africa
- City: Gitarama
- Time zone: UTC+02:00 (Africa/Kigali)
- Languages: Kinyarwanda, English, French, Swahili

Rutobwe was a commune located in Gitarama, Rwanda.
