= Mugina, Kigali =

Mugina
- Sector and town
- Location in Rwanda
- Coordinates: 2.11314°S 29.95498°E
- Country: Rwanda
- Province: Southern Province
- District: Kamonyi

Area
  - Sector and town: 89.75 km^{2} (34.65 sq mi)

Population (2022 census)
  - Sector and town: 45,894
  - Density: 511.4/km^{2} (1,324/sq mi)
  - Urban: 14,755
- (2012 census)

Mugina is a sector and town in Kamonyi District, Southern Province, Rwanda and a suburb of Kigali. The town had a population of 14,755 in the 2012 census, while the sector had a population of 45,894 in the 2022 census.

== History ==
During the Rwandan genocide in 1994, a major massacre occurred in Mugina, during which houses with women and children inside were burned. In total, thousands of people had been killed. On 3 October 2023, Pierre-Claver Karangwa was arrested in the Netherlands for his role in this massacre.

== Notable people ==
Mugina is the birthplace of army officers Augustin Bizimungu and Ildephonse Hategekimana, both of whom were major perpetrators of the Rwandan genocide.
