= Jean-Paul Akayesu =

Rwandan politician convicted of genocide

- Born: 1953 (age 72–73); Taba, Rwanda-Urundi
- Occupation: Mayor of Taba commune in Gitarama prefecture
- Political party: Republican Democratic Movement
- Convictions: Genocide Direct and public incitement to commit genocide Crimes against humanity: Extermination; 3 counts of Murder; Torture; Rape; Other inhumane acts
- Penalty: Life imprisonment (2 September 1998)

Details
- Date apprehended: 10 October 1995
- Imprisoned at: Benin

Jean-Paul Akayesu (born 1953 in Taba) is a former teacher, school inspector, and Republican Democratic Movement (MDR) politician from Rwanda, convicted of genocide for his role in inciting the 1994 genocide against the Tutsi.

== Life ==
Akayesu was the mayor of Taba commune in Gitarama prefecture from April 1993 until June 1994.

As mayor, he was responsible for performing executive functions and maintaining order in Taba, meaning he had command of the communal police and any gendarmes assigned to the commune. He was subject only to the prefect. He was considered well-liked and intelligent.

During the 1994 genocide against the Tutsi of mid-1994, Akayesu enabled the killing, rape and violation of many Tutsis in his commune. Akayesu not only refrained from stopping the killings, but personally supervised the systemic murder of Tutsis. He also gave a death list to other Hutus, and ordered house-to-house searches to locate Tutsis.

== Trial ==
Akayesu was arrested in Zambia in October 1995, making Zambia the first African nation to extradite criminals to the International Criminal Tribunal for Rwanda (ICTR).

In 1996, Godeliève Mukasarasi was contacted by the United Nations to assist in putting together a case against him. Mukasarasi was intimidated and her husband and daughter were killed but she found four people who were willing to testify. She was given an International Women of Courage Award in 2018 for this and other work.

He stood trial for 15 counts of genocide, crimes against humanity, including rape during the 1994 genocide against the Tutsi and violations of the Geneva Convention. It was the first ever prosecution brought under the auspices of the Genocide Convention. Pierre-Richard Prosper was the lead prosecutor. Akayesu's defence team argued that Akayesu had no part in the killings, and that he had been powerless to stop them. In short, the defence argued, Akayesu was being made a scapegoat for the crimes of the people of Taba.

Despite this defence, the ICTR found him guilty of 9 counts of genocide, numerous crimes against humanity and direct and public incitement to commit genocide; however, he was found not guilty for the counts of complicity in genocide, Article 3 of the Geneva Conventions (war crime), and Article 4(2)(e) of Additional Protocol II to the Geneva Conventions. This was notable in that it was the first time that the 1948 Convention on the Prevention and Punishment of the Crime of Genocide was enforced and in doing so clearly differentiated the mental element of the crime Genocide from the mental element in the breaches of the Geneva Conventions. The court clarified that Genocide is a crime of specific intent that takes the accused outside of the scope of armed conflict. On October 2, 1998, Akayesu was sentenced to life imprisonment.

He was represented by Montreal lawyer John Philpot, brother of Parti Québécois politician and author Robin Philpot; this connection later surfaced in the 2007 Quebec general election after statements from Robin Philpot's book Rwanda 1994: Colonialism Dies Hard appearing to deny the extent of the genocide were widely publicized.

The September 1999 United Nations brief, "Fourth Annual Report of the International Criminal Tribunal for Rwanda to the General Assembly," stated the following concerning the guilty ruling:

The Prosecutor v. Jean Paul Akayesu (ICTR-96-4-T)

14. On 2 September 1998, Trial Chamber I of the International Criminal Tribunal for Rwanda, composed of Judges Laïty Kama, Presiding, Lennart Aspegren and Navanethem Pillay, found Jean Paul Akayesu guilty of 9 of the 15 counts proffered against him, including genocide, direct and public incitement to commit genocide and crimes against humanity (extermination, murder, torture, rape and other inhumane acts). Jean Paul Akayesu was found not guilty of the six remaining counts, including the count of complicity in genocide and the counts relating to violations of article 3 common to the Geneva Conventions and of Additional Protocol II thereto.

15. The Akayesu judgement includes the first interpretation and application by an international court of the 1948 Convention on the Prevention and Punishment of the Crime of Genocide.

16. The Trial Chamber held that rape, which it defined as "a physical invasion of a sexual nature committed on a person under circumstances which are coercive", and sexual assault constitute acts of genocide insofar as they were committed with the intent to destroy, in whole or in part, a targeted group, as such. It found that sexual assault formed an integral part of the process of destroying the Tutsi ethnic group and that the rape was systematic and had been perpetrated against Tutsi women only, manifesting the specific intent required for those acts to constitute genocide.

17. On 2 September 1998, Jean Paul Akayesu was sentenced to life imprisonment for each of the nine counts, the sentences to run concurrently.

18. Both Jean Paul Akayesu and the Prosecutor have appealed against the judgement rendered by the Trial Chamber.

Akayesu was first transferred to Mali on 9 December 2001 to serve out his sentence, before later being transferred to Benin on 19 December 2020.

The trial is the subject of the 2015 documentary film, The Uncondemned.
