= Nyamabuye (sector) =

- Sector
- Country: Rwanda
- Province: Southern Province
- District: Muhanga District

Area
  - Sector: 29.71 km^{2} (11.47 sq mi)

Population (2022 census)
  - Sector: 59,961
  - Density: 2,018/km^{2} (5,227/sq mi)
  - Urban: 49,224

Nyamabuye is a sector in Muhanga District, Southern Province in Rwanda, with a population of 59,961 (2022 census) and an area of 29.71 square kilometers. The central and western part of the district capital Muhanga is located within the sector. The area is expected to see advances in local economy in the next ten years. The government of Rwanda has poured 100 thousand into boosting the area Nyamabuye and help bring better access water and food to the region.
