= Jill Dougherty =

American journalist

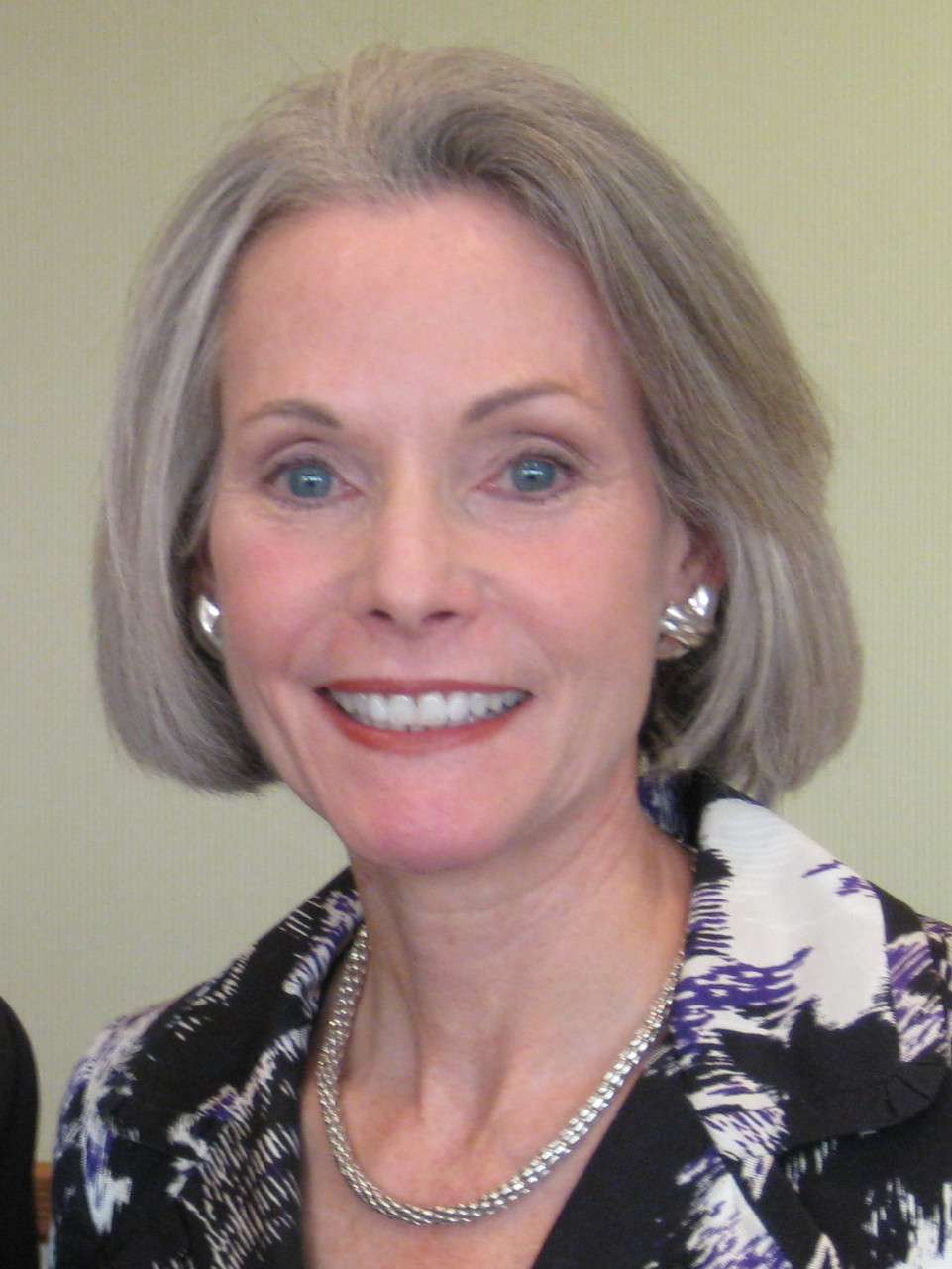
Dougherty at the University of Scranton in 2010.

Jill Dougherty (born 1949) is an American journalist and academic. She is considered an expert on Russia and the former Soviet Union.

She worked as a correspondent for CNN for three decades. She served as White House Correspondent, Foreign Affairs correspondent covering the US State Department, US Affairs Editor, Managing Editor for CNN Asia/Pacific, and for almost a decade, as Moscow Bureau Chief.

Dougherty began her career as a Russian-language broadcaster and writer for Voice of America, USSR Division. After three decades at CNN, she left in 2013, but continues to report on Russia as an analyst and independent consultant.

== Education ==
Dougherty received her bachelor's degree in Slavic Languages and Literature from the University of Michigan and her master's degree from Georgetown University, where she researched Russia's soft power diplomacy. She was a Benton Fellow in Broadcast Journalism at the University of Chicago, as well as a fellow at the Harvard Kennedy School of Government and a Distinguished Fellow at the Woodrow Wilson International Center for Scholars in Washington, DC. As an undergraduate Dougherty also studied at Leningrad State University in the Soviet Union.

Dougherty spent much of her career as a journalist and in 2014 she started also contributing as fellow at academic activities. She was Centennial Fellow and instructor at Georgetown University's Walsh School of Foreign Service.

== Personal life ==
Dougherty was diagnosed with breast cancer in 1999 at age 50.
