= Léonidas Rusatira =

Former colonel in the Rwandan Armed Forces (FAR)

Léonidas Rusatira was a colonel in the Rwandan Armed Forces (FAR) during the Rwandan genocide in 1994. He was also commander of the Ecole Supérieure Militaire (ESM) military school and Directeur de Cabinet of the Rwanda Ministry of Defence. He was arrested on 15 May 2002 on a warrant issued by Judge Lloyd George Williams. An investigation led by Alison Des Forges convinced the prosecutor to drop the charges against Rusatira.

Rusatira has described himself as "a Hutu from the north". Rusatira fled to Zaire when the FAR were defeated by Rwandan Patriotic Front (RPF) forces. Though approximately 2 million Hutu remained in the exile after the genocide, Rusatire returned to Rwanda and by 1995 he had been "reintegrated" into the Rwandan military. In November 1995, he left Rwanda once again and fled to exile in Brussels. While in Brussels he was critical of the Rwandan government arguing that "the system used in Kigali wants, while downplaying the genocide into an inexhaustible source of political exploitation, to finish off all attempts at contestation by using all available means to force into silence all opinion leaders and to eliminate potential interlocutors."
