= Gregory Gordon (lawyer) =

American scholar

Gregory S. Gordon is an American professor and scholar of international law and former Legal Officer for the Office of the Prosecutor of the ICTR. Gordon is known for his academic work calling for the criminalization under international law of a broader category of speech likely to cause and/or fuel mass atrocities (i.e., broader than mere incitement to genocide), and his book Atrocity Speech Law: Foundation, Fragmentation, Fruition (Oxford University Press 2017) in which he advances this argument.

== Career ==
Gordon served as a Legal Officer for the Office of The Prosecutor (OTP) at the International Criminal Tribunal for Rwanda on the Media Case. Before leaving the OTP, he was assigned as an attorney for the first trial team established to prosecute the Media Case (which, at the time, also included attorneys James Kirkpatrick Stewart of Canada and Craig McConaghy of Australia). He went on to serve as a prosecutor for the United States Department of Justice, first with the Criminal Tax Section of the Tax Division (during which time he served as a Special Assistant United States Attorney for the District of Columbia and as a liaison to the Organized Crime Drug Enforcement Task Forces), and then with the Criminal Division's Office of Special Investigations (known as the "Nazi Hunting" unit). During his academic career, he has served as the director of University of North Dakota's Center for Human Rights and Genocide Studies (where he also worked as a law professor) and has been a consultant for the Sentinel Project for Genocide Prevention, among other non-governmental organizations. He is currently Professor of Law at The Chinese University of Hong Kong Faculty of Law, where he has previously served as Associate Dean (External Relations/Development) and Director of both the Research Postgraduates and Legal History LLM Programs.

== Views ==
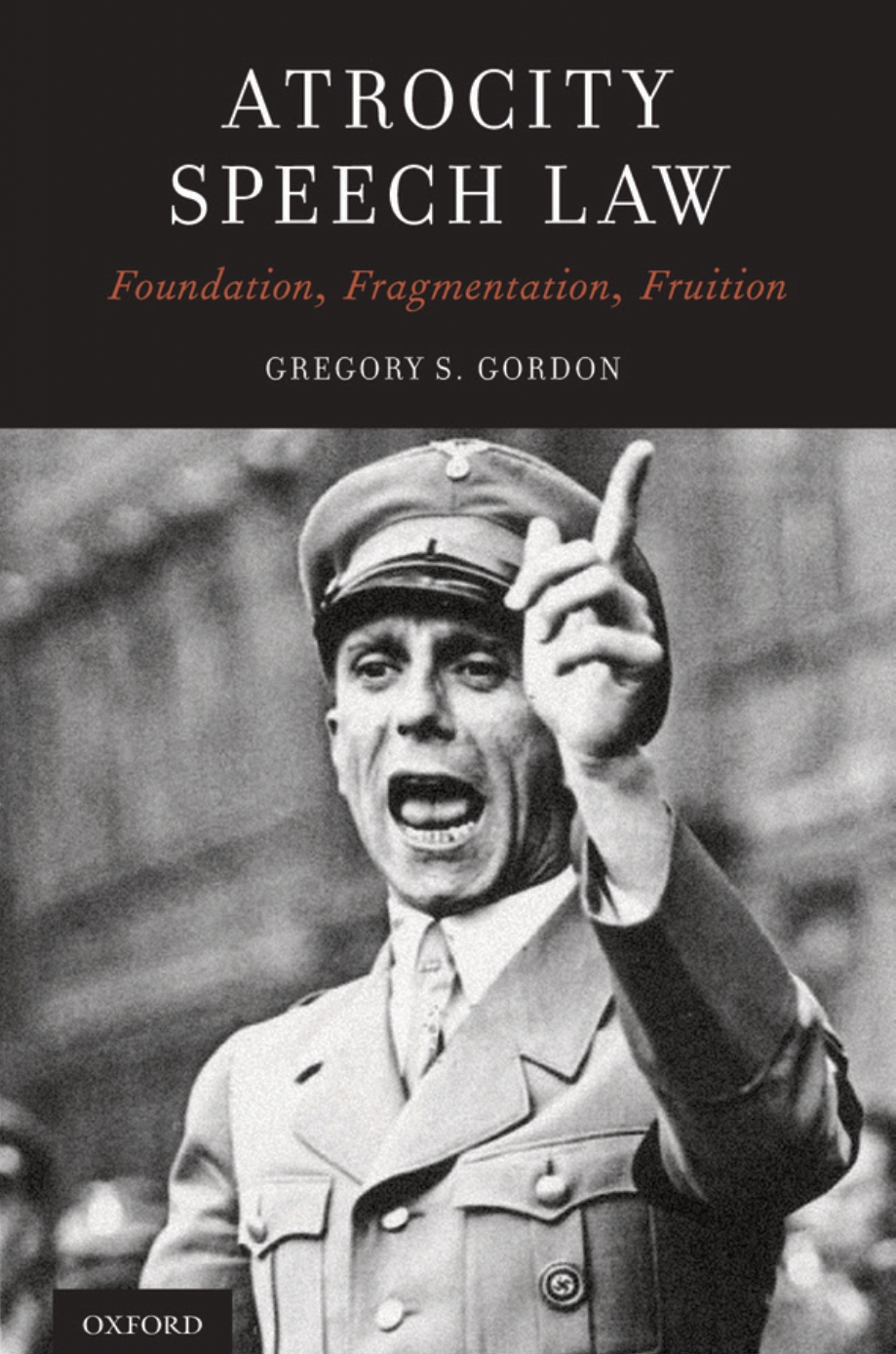
Atrocity Speech Law cover has a picture of Joseph Goebbels.

Gordon supports establishing categorizing the body of law regulating the relationship between speech and international crimes as "atrocity speech law." The new appellation would also involve expanding the types of prosecutable offenses within its ambit. This would mean going beyond mere incitement to genocide (currently criminalized), and adding to the list of prosecutable offenses incitement to war crimes and incitement to crimes against humanity (inchoate offense, as they would be prosecutable, if the right elements were present, even if the target crimes advocated never took place). Gordon also supports criminalizing the ordering of atrocity crimes as inchoate offenses (at present, ordering can be prosecuted only if the target crime ordered is actually committed). He supports the prosecution of people who are guilty of atrocity speech, and argues that international criminal law has a deterrent effect on those who are contemplating committing mass murder. Gordon has said that "if you don't prosecute the purveyors of these horrible messages, then you will definitely be looking at another genocide down the road". He has analyzed the possibility of prosecuting Iranian president Mahmoud Ahmadinejad for incitement to genocide and hate speech as the crime against humanity of persecution.

== Atrocity Speech Law ==
Gordon's book Atrocity Speech Law: Foundation, Fragmentation, Fruition, which is about extreme hate speech in international law, was published by Oxford University Press in 2017 and has received multiple positive reviews. In the book, which Giovanni Chiarini has described as a "paradigm-shifting" work that "has helped change the very vocabulary we use to describe the rules and jurisprudence governing the relationship between hate speech and core international crimes," Gordon delineates the boundary between protected free speech and speech which is likely to cause mass violence, which he believes should be outlawed under international law. Gordon criticizes the current state of law on atrocity speech, which he considers fragmented and incoherent. For example, the International Criminal Tribunal for Rwanda and International Criminal Tribunal for the former Yugoslavia came to different conclusions about the prosecution of hate speech as crimes against humanity (persecution), with the ICTR holding that speech that does not directly call for violence may be prosecutable, while the ICTY disagreed. Gordon proposes an expansion and systematization of the criminalization of atrocity speech. Benjamin B. Ferencz, chief prosecutor of the Einsatzgruppen Trial, wrote the foreword to the book, which he praised as "an important cornerstone that will serve as a foundation stone for the future prosecution of crimes against humanity."

== Works ==
- Gordon, Gregory S. (2017). Atrocity Speech Law: Foundation, Fragmentation, Fruition. Oxford University Press. ISBN 978-0-19-061270-2.
- Gordon, Gregory S. (2025). Nuremberg's Citizen Prosecutor: Benjamin Ferencz and the Birth of International Justice. University of Virginia Press. ISBN 978-0813953090.
