= Taba commune =

Taba was a commune located in the historic Gitarama Prefecture of Rwanda. During the Rwandan genocide in 1994 massacres and atrocities were committed in Taba. The Hutu Interahamwe militia murdered hundreds of Tutsi and Tutsi women were raped in government offices. The mayor of Taba, at the time of the atrocities, was Jean Paul Akayesu. Akayesu was the first person convicted of genocide by the International Criminal Tribunal for Rwanda (ICTR).

After the genocide Association de Solidarité des Femmes Rwandaises (ASOFERWA – translates to "Rwandan Women’s Solidarity Association") built a "Peace Village" in Taba. The ICTR contributed 15% of the needed budget to build the 23 houses of the "Peace Village". There were concerns at the time about overlap between those implementing the reparations project and those involved with the criminal proceedings at the Tribunal.

Elections were held in Taba on March 29, 1999. The elections consisted of groups of 50-100 families selecting a committee of 10 persons who would vote in elections for the larger administrative areas. The voting was accomplished by supporters publicly queueing behind their candidate of choice.
