= Muhanga District =

Coordinates: 02°05′S 29°45′E

- District
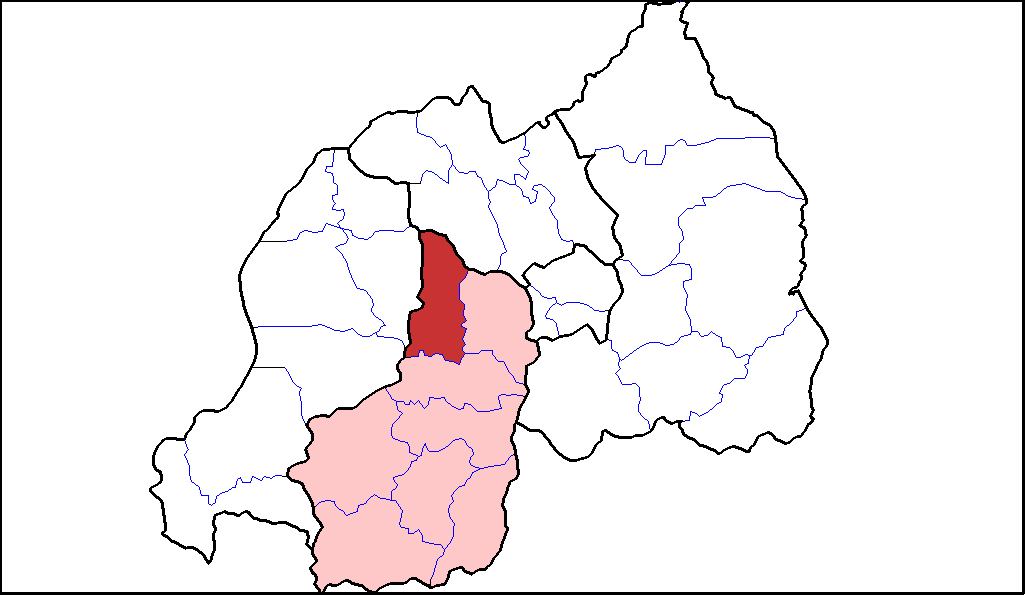
- Shown within Southern Province and Rwanda
- Country: Rwanda
- Province: Southern
- Capital: Muhanga

Area
  - District: 648.3 km^{2} (250.3 sq mi)

Population (2022 census)
  - District: 358,433
  - Density: 552.9/km^{2} (1,432/sq mi)
  - Urban: 87,252
  - Rural: 271,181
- Website: http://www.muhanga.gov.rw/

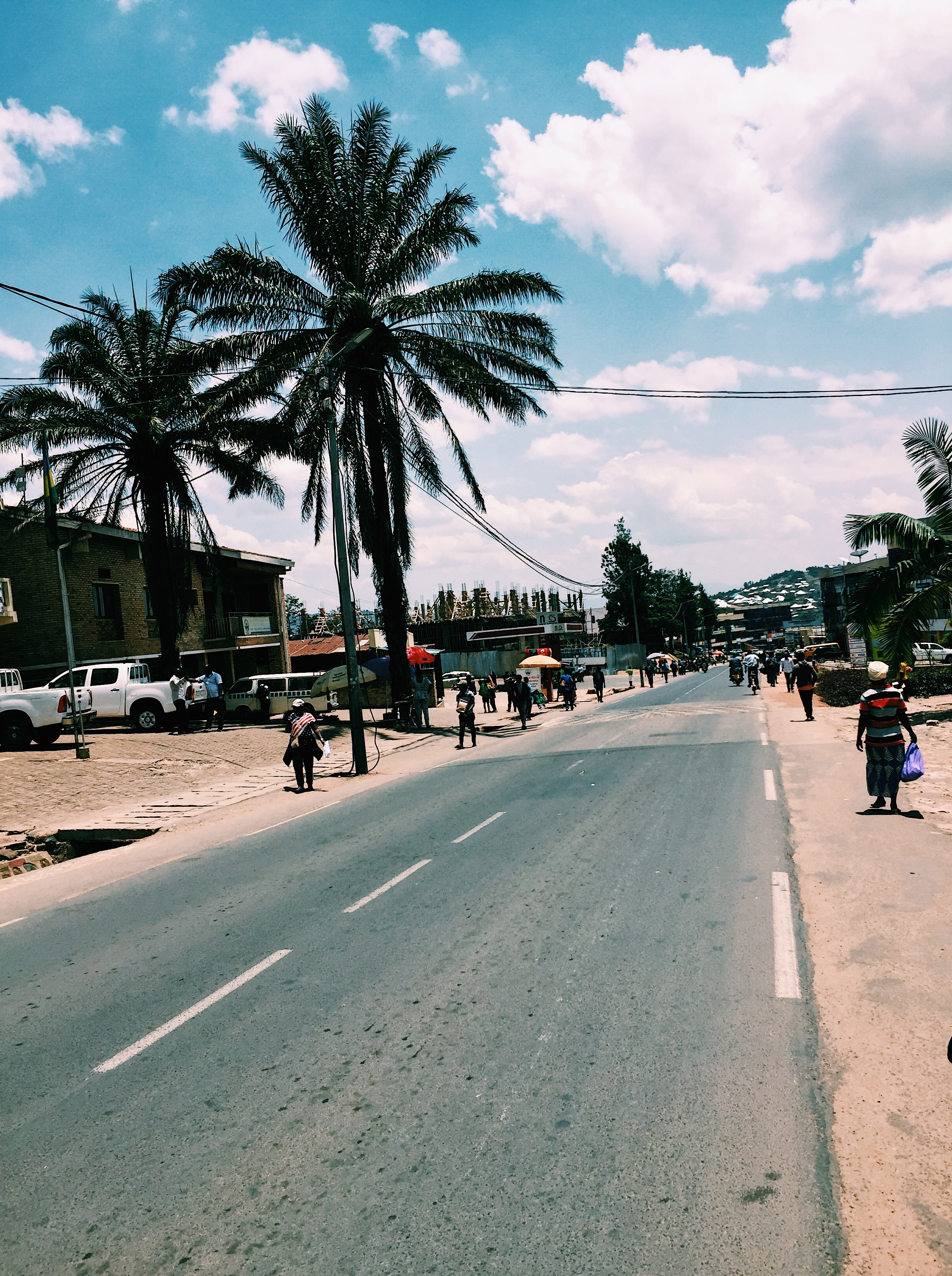
Muhanga District

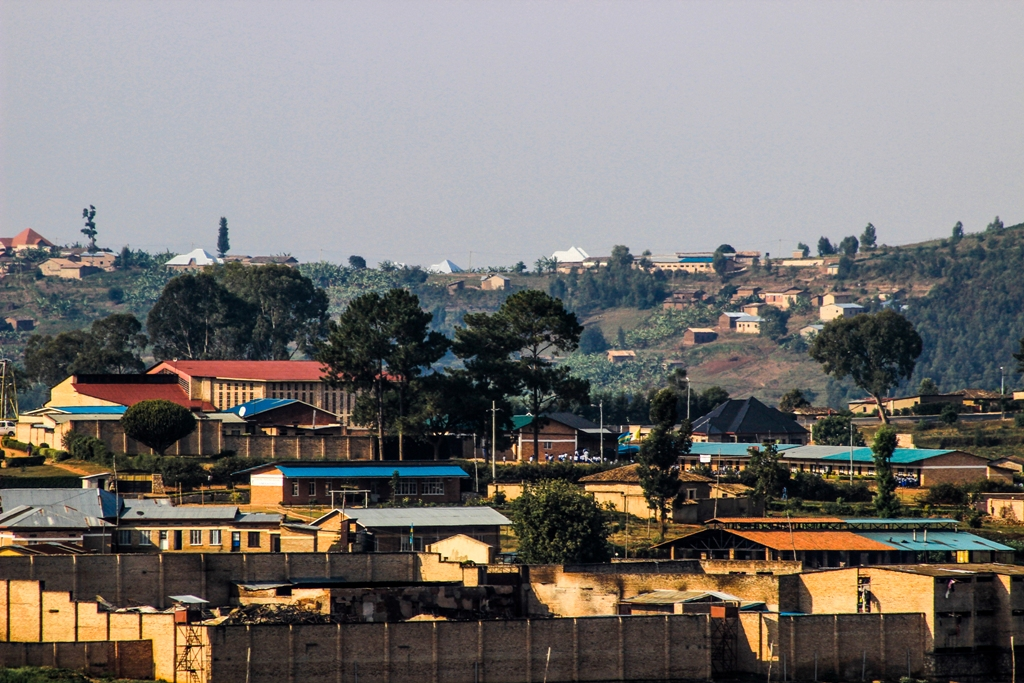
Muhanga district

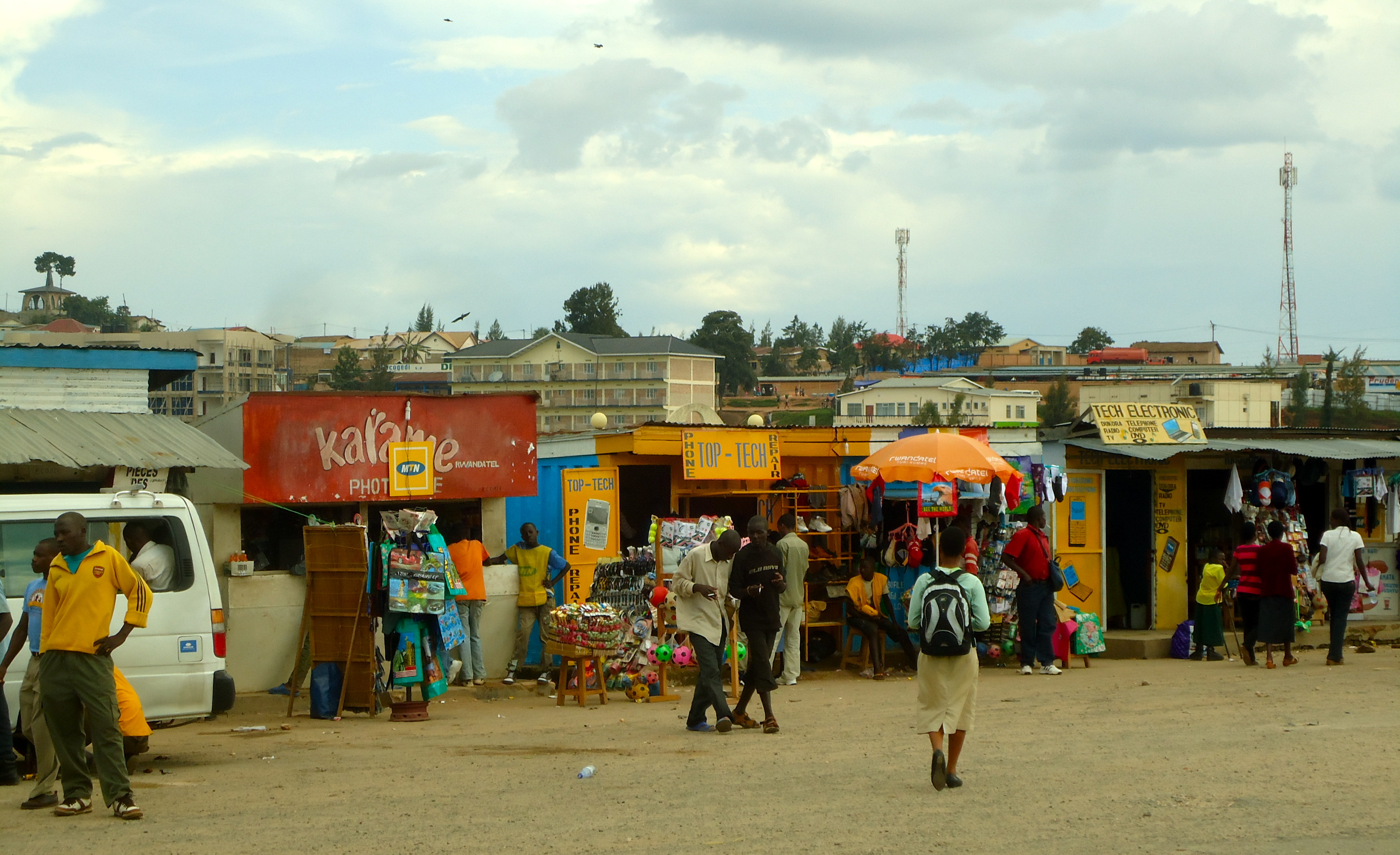
Muhanga (Gitarama)

Muhanga is a district (akarere) in Rwanda. It is found in southern province and its administrative centre is located in the city of Muhanga (former Gitarama).

== Geography ==
Muhanga Districtis one of the eight districts comprising the Southern Province. It is subdivided into twelve (12) sectors, sixty three (63) cells and three hundred and thirty one (331) villages (Imidugudu). The District covers an area of six hundred forty seven point seven square kilometers (647.7 km2) and, it is neighbouring the Districts of Gakenke in the North, Kamonyi in the East, Ruhango in the South and Ngororero in the West, Karongi District to the southwest and Ngororero District to the west

== Relief and climate ==
One part of Muhanga District is located in the "central plateau" of the country with topography of hills type. With high and low peaks, this part constitutes one of the best elements of the central "plateau" of the country. The other part of the District is on the high mountains of the Nil-Congo; it has peaks prancing beyond 2000 meters. The District is located in an area well watered, between 1100 mm and 1200 mm of altitude. This region enjoys a climate of four seasons of which two rainy seasons and two dry seasons: a short rainy season, which extends from October to December, a short dry season that runs from January to February, and a long rainy season from March to June and a long dry season from June to August or early September. The District is located mainly in the agro-bioclimatic region called "Granite Ridge". However, it has some peaks namely Budaha-Ndiza and buberuka. (Muhanga, 2007).

== Population ==
According to the Population and Housing of NISR, 2012, the total population of Muhanga district is 319,965. Males are less 155,193 (49%) than female 163,772 (51%). The Sectors of Nyamabuye (14%), Shyogwe (14%) and Cyeza (9%) located in southern part of the District and constituting the city of Muhanga are more populated and less populated are Rugendabari (5%) and Nyabinoni (5%).

== Agriculture ==
=== Maize crop ===
Maize is the main crop cultivated in Muhanga District, where it is cultivated in Marshlands and also on land scape, the crops has a big importance in the development of Muhanga District population, where they consume it and it generates money to them. According to the population of Muhanga, maize is the first crop needed in their daily life. The Economy of Muhanga District is also based on Agriculture of coffee, rice, cassava, vegetables and cereals.

== Education ==
In this district, the net primary school enrolment rate is 90.7%, net secondary school enrolment is 20.8% and literacy rate for persons aged 15–24 years is 86%. This is somehow different from the national achievements which are at: 91.7% for net primary school enrolment rate, 20.9% for gross secondary school enrolment and 83.7% for literacy rate for persons aged 15–24 years. The literacy rate is at 71.1% in Muhanga District against 69.7% of the total Rwandan population.

== Overview ==
The district lies in the geographic centre of Rwanda, and contains three major radial roads leading to Kigali to the east, Butare to the south and Kibuye on the shores of Lake Kivu to the west. A fourth road leads north to Gisenyi, also on the eastern shores of Lake Kivu and to Ruhengeri in the foothills of the Virunga Mountains. Muhanga district is home to Kabgayi, the traditional centre of the catholic church in Rwanda, and Shyogwe, a big Anglican centre.

== Transportation ==
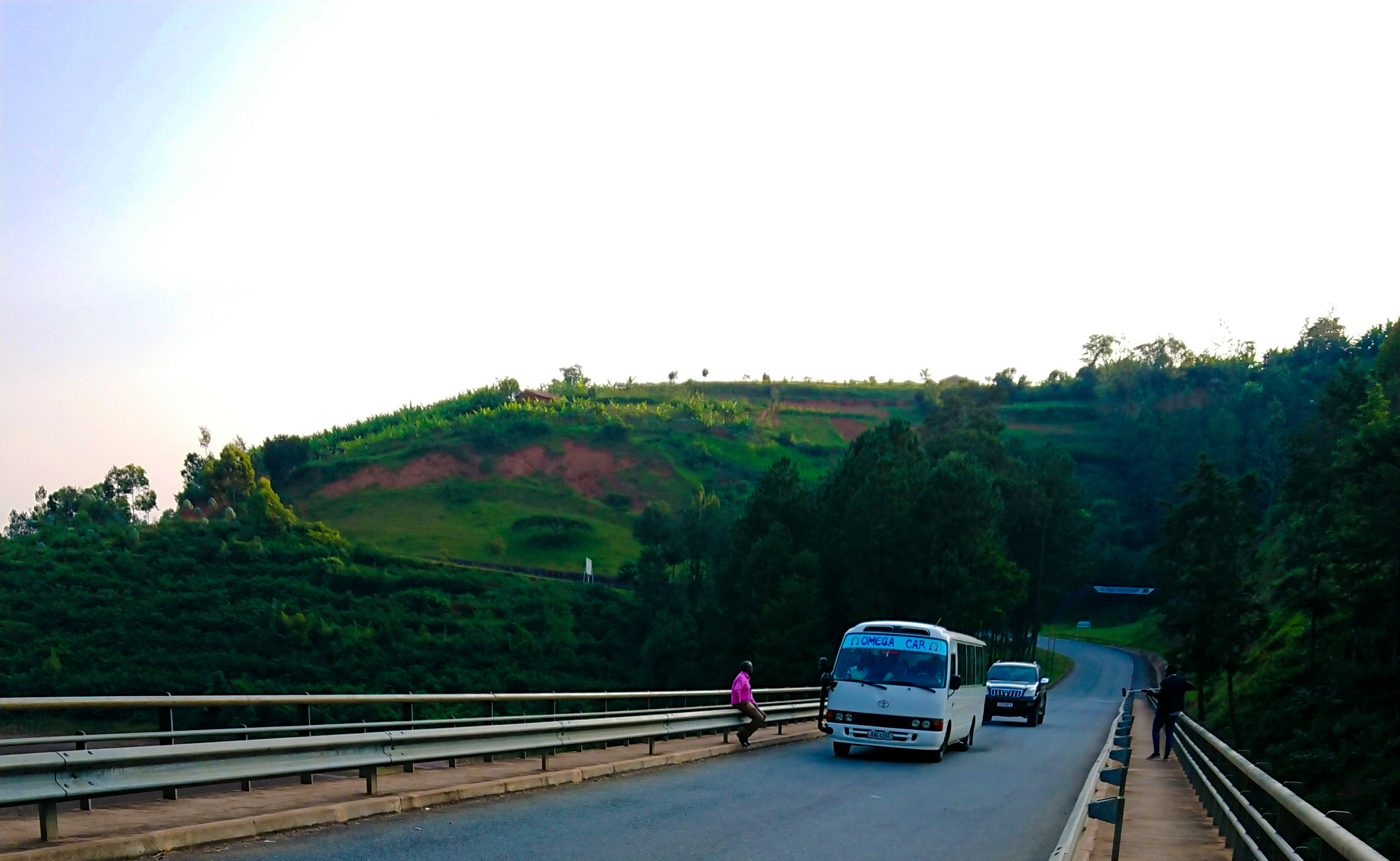
Omega Express in Muhanga District

== See also ==
- Districts of Rwanda
- Provinces of Rwanda
