= Muhanga =

Muhanga City Gitarama
- City
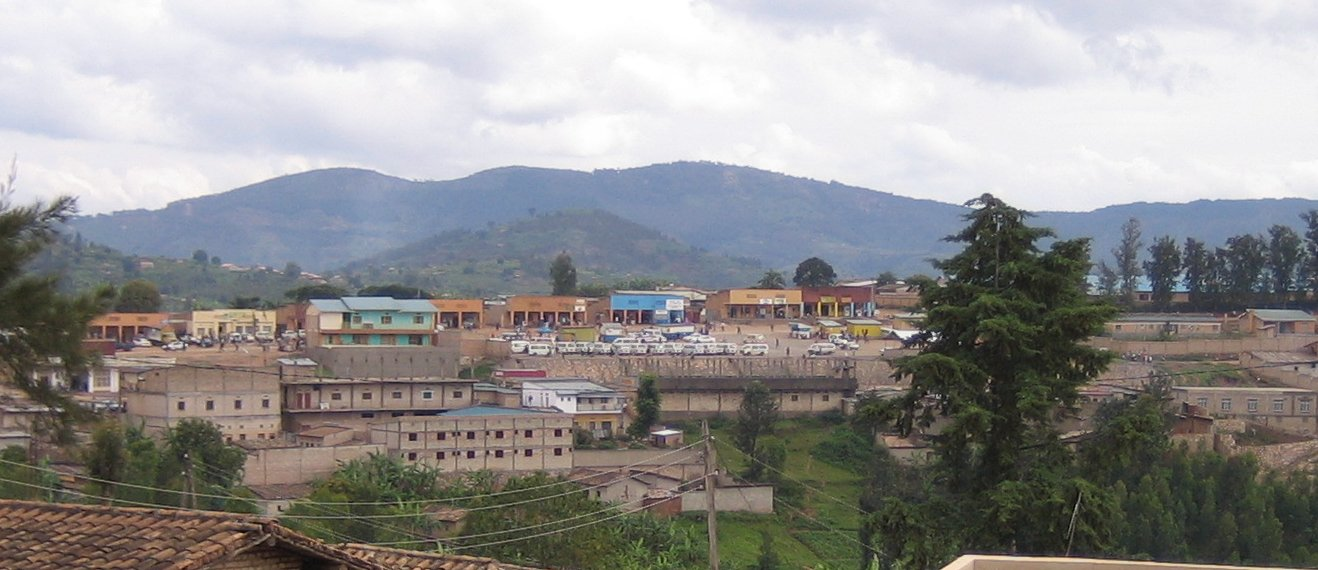
- Central Muhanga

- Location in Rwanda
- Coordinates: 2°5′3″S 29°45′5″E
- Country: Rwanda
- Province: Southern Province
- District: Muhanga District
- Sectors: Nyamabuye and Shyogwe
- City: Gitarama City Council
- Elevation: 1,812 m (5,945 ft)

Population (2022 census)
  - Total: 82,797
- Climate: Aw

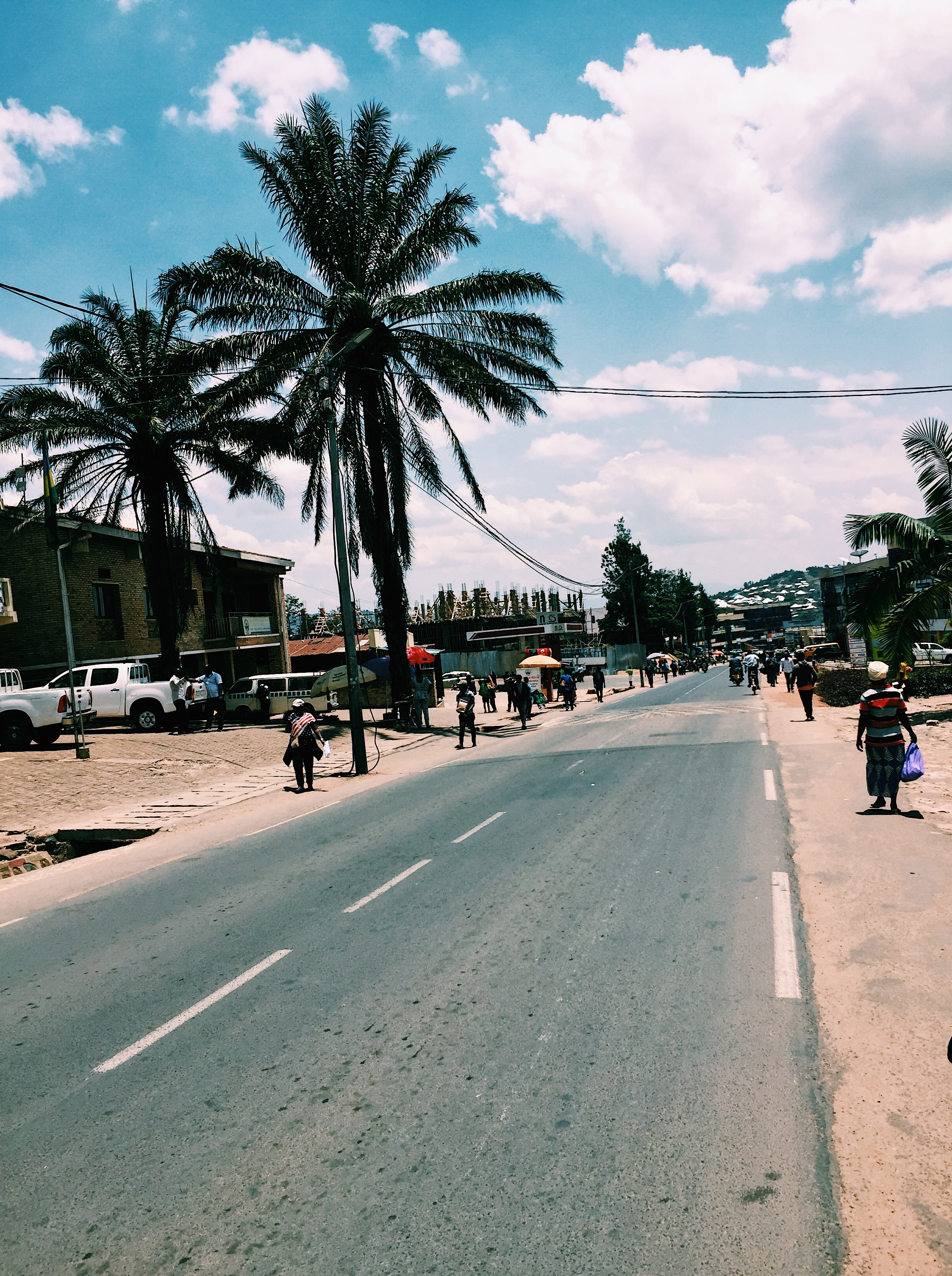
People in Muhanga District

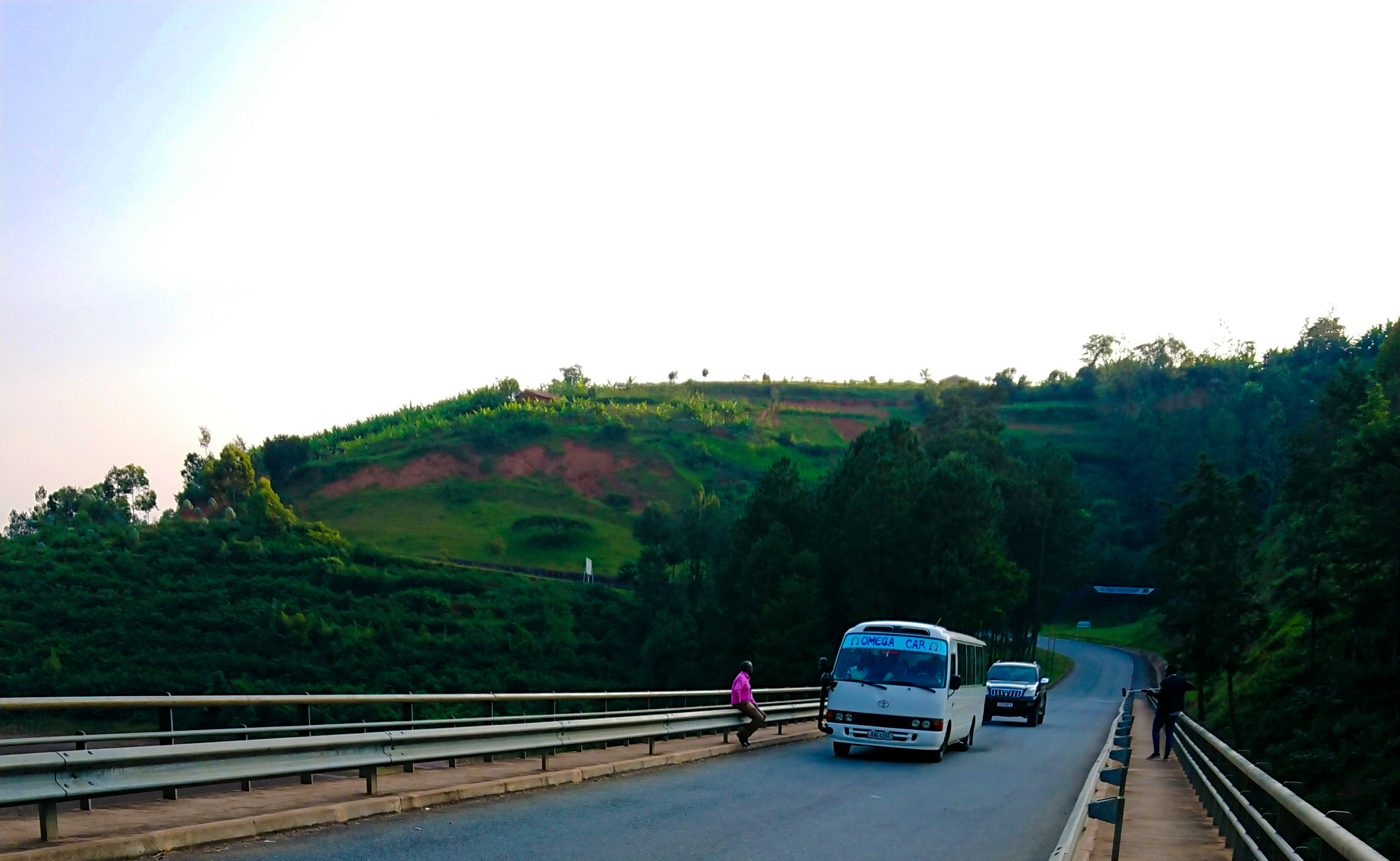
Omega Express in South Rwanda

Muhanga (former Gitarama, renamed in 2006) is a city in Rwanda, in the Muhanga District, in Southern Province. The city is situated 5,945 feet (1,812 m) above sea level.

Though officially part of the Southern Province, Muhanga is geographically located in central Rwanda, approximately 45 kilometres (28 mi) by road southwest of Kigali, Rwanda's capital and largest city. This location lies approximately 85 kilometres (53 mi), north of Kibeho, in Nyaruguru District, the southernmost district in Southern Province. The provincial headquarters at Nyanza in Nyanza District lie about 40 kilometres (25 mi), by road, directly south of Muhanga.

The city is known as an industrial and minerals processing hub in Rwanda, and is one of three satellite cities in the country. As one of Rwanda's largest cities and its close proximity to Kigali, it is a popular secondary city and target of the government's regional growth strategy.

== Overview ==
Muhanga is the fourth-largest city in Rwanda and the capital and largest metropolitan area in the district of Muhanga. Due to its geographical location, the city serves as the gateway to the west and south of the country.

The city is known for its mineral resources, including coltan, wolfram and cassiterite. There are also a number of open pit mines for gravel and sand in the city.

During the 1994 Rwandan genocide, Muhanga district, then known as Gitarama, was one of twelve provinces and would become the seat of the provisional government.

== Amenities ==
The city has the following public services and economic activities, including:

Administration and public safety and services

- The offices of Muhanga District Administration
- The offices of Muhanga District Council
- Muhanga District Prison
- Muhanga High Court Building
- Kabgayi Hospital
- Muhanga Cultural Center

Educational institutions

- St. Leon Minor Seminary, Kabgayi
- Kabgayi Major Seminary
- St. Joseph Primary School
- St. Joseph Secondary School
- St. Elizabeth Nurses & Midwives College
- Kabgayi Technical College
- Kabgayi Catholic Institute
- Catholic University of Rwanda
- Gitarama Adventist Secondary School
- St. Marie-Reine Secondary School
- Groupe Scolaire de Nyabikenke
- College de Karambi
- College Adventiste de Gitwe

Economy

- Muhanga Farmers' Market
- A branch of Inkingi Microfinance Limited
- Three branches of Bank of Kigali
- A branch of Ecobank Rwanda
- A branch of Fina Bank Rwanda
- A branch of Banque Populaire du Rwanda SA
- Zipline delivers supplies from Muhanga to medical centres around the area using drones

Religious

- Kabgayi Minor Basilica
- St. Andrew's Pastoral Center
- Muhanga Zion Temple
- St. Andrew's Church

== Population ==
The 2022 national census put the city's population at 85,000.

== Notable people ==
- Dominique Mbonyumutwa
- Tatiana Mukakibibi
- Godeliève Mukasarasi
- Fred Rwigyema

== See also ==
- Districts of Rwanda
- Provinces of Rwanda
