= United Nations Security Council Resolution 1824 =

UN Security Council Resolution 1824
- Date: 18 July 2008
- Meeting no.: 5,937
- Code: S/RES/1824 (Document)
- Subject: International Humanitarian Law Committed in the Territory of Rwanda
- Voting summary: 15 voted for; None voted against; None abstained
- Result: Adopted

Security Council composition
- Permanent members: China; France; Russia; United Kingdom; United States
- Non-permanent members: Burkina Faso; Belgium; Costa Rica; Croatia; Indonesia; Italy; Libya; Panama; South Africa; Vietnam

United Nations Security Council Resolution 1824 was unanimously adopted on 18 July 2008.

== Resolution ==
With the mandate of the judges of the International Criminal Tribunal for Rwanda set to expire at the end of this year, but with trials expected to continue beyond that time, the Security Council today extended the term of office of 9 permanent and 17 ad litem judges to allow for the completion of the Tribunal’s work.

By the terms of resolution 1824 (2008), which was unanimously adopted, the Council noted the projections for the completion of all the Tribunal’s remaining cases at trial stage before the end of 2009, and expressed its expectation that the extension of the judges’ terms of office would enhance the effectiveness of those proceedings and contribute towards ensuring the Tribunal’s completion strategy.

As explained in a letter from the President of the International Criminal Tribunal for Rwanda, which was transmitted in identical letters to the Presidents of the Council and General Assembly, by the terms of its resolution 1503 (2003), the Council had called upon the Tribunal to take all possible measures to complete all trial activities at first instance by the end of 2008, and the Tribunal has substantially complied with that strategy. However, due to new developments beyond the Tribunal’s control, including the arrest of two high-level accused at the end of 2007 and one early in 2008, the scheduling of these trials “cannot avoid a spillover of the evidence phase into 2009, with judgement delivery in the second half of 2009”.

With two permanent judges and one ad litem judge intending to resign upon the completion of their cases this year, the Tribunal’s President had sought an extension, to 31 December 2009, for nine permanent judges and eight ad litem judges, whose terms of office are to expire on 31 December 2008. As a contingency against the unexpected, he also sought an extension to 31 December 2009 of the terms of the remaining nine ad litem judges who were not yet appointed to serve at the Tribunal.

The Council decided to extend the terms of office of two permanent judges who are members of the Appeals Chamber until 31 December 2010, or until the completion of the appeals (if sooner), and extended the terms of the rest of the judges through 31 December 2009, as requested by the Tribunal President.

As the statute of the International Tribunal does not provide for extending the terms of office of the judges, by the terms of the resolution adopted today the Council, as the parent organ of the International Tribunal, also approved an amendment of related articles of the Statute to allow for an extension.

== See also ==
- List of United Nations Security Council Resolutions 1801 to 1900 (2008–2009)
