= United Nations Security Council Resolution 1878 =

UN Security Council Resolution 1878
- Date: 7 July 2009
- Meeting no.: 6,156
- Code: S/RES/1878 (Document)
- Subject: International Criminal Tribunal for Rwanda
- Voting summary: 15 voted for; None voted against; None abstained
- Result: Adopted

Security Council composition
- Permanent members: China; France; Russia; United Kingdom; United States
- Non-permanent members: Austria; Burkina Faso; Costa Rica; Croatia; Japan; Libya; Mexico; Turkey; Uganda; Vietnam

United Nations Security Council Resolution 1878 was unanimously adopted on 7 July 2009.

== Resolution ==
Urging the International Criminal Tribunal for Rwanda to take all possible measures to complete its work expeditiously, the Security Council today extended the term of office of six permanent judges until 31 December 2010, or until the completion of the cases to which they were or will be assigned if sooner.

Unanimously adopting resolution 1878 (2009), tabled by Austria, under Chapter VII of the United Nations Charter, the Council also extended until the same date the term of office of 11 ad litem judges.

Stressing that it did so without setting a precedent, the Council also decided, among other things, that two judges (Judge Asoka de Silva from Sri Lanka and Judge Emile Francis Short from Ghana) might work part-time and engage in another judicial occupation of independent status in their home countries during the remainder of their terms of office.

Expressing its expectation that the extension of the term of office of judges would contribute towards the implementation of the Tribunal’s completion strategy, the Council further decided to review the extension of the term of office of the permanent judges who were members of the Appeals Chamber by 31 December 2009.

The International Criminal Tribunal for Rwanda (ICTR) was established in 1994 by resolution 955 for the prosecution of persons responsible for genocide and other serious violations of international humanitarian law committed in the territory of Rwanda between 1 January 1994 and 31 December 1994. It may also deal with the prosecution of Rwandan citizens responsible for genocide and other such violations of international law committed in the territory of neighbouring States during the same period.

== See also ==
- List of United Nations Security Council Resolutions 1801 to 1900 (2008–2009)
