= Inés Mónica Weinberg de Roca =

Argentine lawyer (born 1948)

Justice Inés Mónica Weinberg de Roca
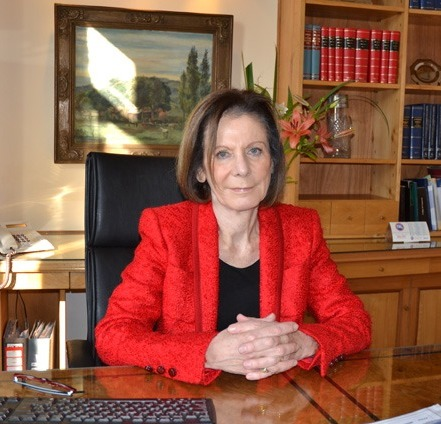

Minister of the Superior Tribunal of Justice of the City of Buenos Aires
- Incumbent
- Assumed office 1 June 2013
- Preceded by: Julio Maier

Judge of the International Criminal Tribunal for Rwanda
- In office 31 January 2003 – 31 December 2008

Personal details
- Born: Inés Mónica Weinberg; 16 December 1948 (age 77) Buenos Aires, Argentina

Justice Inés Mónica Weinberg de Roca (née Inés Mónica Weinberg) is an Argentine Judge of the Supreme Court of city of Buenos Aires and a Judge of the United Nations Appeals Tribunal in New York City. She was born in Buenos Aires, Argentina on December 16, 1948.

From 2003 to 2008 she was a Judge of the International Criminal Tribunal for Rwanda, serving the joint Appeal Chamber of the ICTR and the International Criminal Tribunal for the former Yugoslavia in The Hague from 2003 to 2005, and on the trial chamber in Arusha, Tanzania from 2005 to 2008.

Before becoming an international Judge, Justice Weinberg de Roca was a lawyer. She then became a Civil Judge, and later an Appeals Judge at Buenos Aires' Administrative Court. Justice Weinberg de Roca is also a Private international law Professor at the University of Buenos Aires (UBA) and at the Universidad Argentina de la Empresa (UADE).

== Personal life and education ==
Justice Inés Mónica Weinberg de Roca was born to a middle class, German Jewish family in Buenos Aires. Her parents fled Germany in the early 1930s because of Nazism.

She attended St Peter's School, an English school in a northern Buenos Aires suburb. She holds a law degree of the University of Buenos Aires and a Juris Doctor from the National University of La Plata, in Argentina. Her doctoral thesis was nominated to the Premio Facultad (Faculty Award). The jury approved it with the magna cum laude distinction.

Justice Weinberg de Roca was a researcher in Private International Law at the Max-Planck-Institut of Hamburg, Germany (1972-1973).

She speaks Spanish, English, German and French. She was married to diplomat Eduardo A. Roca (1921–2019), who was Argentina's ambassador to the United Nations during the country's last military dictatorship (1976–1983) and to the United States and the OAS during the military dictatorship of Juan Carlos Onganía (1966–1970).

== Lawyer and Judge ==
Inés Mónica Weinberg de Roca worked as an independent lawyer in Buenos Aires, before being appointed a civil judge in Buenos Aires in 1993.

In 2000, she was selected as an appeals judge at the newly created Administrative and Tax Courts (Tribunales Contencioso Administrativos y Tributarios).

In 2013 Justice Weinberg de Roca was appointed a Justice at the Supreme Court of Buenos Aires.

== International career ==
Justice Inés Mónica Weinberg de Roca served as an Advisor on International Law at the Argentine Ministry of Foreign Affairs. She represented Argentina at various conferences and symposia and was Argentina's representative at the International Institute for the Unification of Private Law.

In 2002, Argentina appointed Inés Mónica Weinberg de Roca as its candidate for the International Criminal Tribunal for Rwanda (ICTR). She won that position's election, which was held at the UN General Assembly in January 2003.

On May 26, 2003, Justice Inés Weinberg de Roca sworn in as Judge of the ICTR, based in Arusha, Tanzania.

Since the ICTR has two representatives at the shared Appeals Chamber (together with the International Criminal Tribunal for the Former Yugoslavia (ICTY)), Justice Weinberg de Roca was designated as a member of the Appeals Chamber on June 4, 2003, and thus she became a permanent Judge of the ICTY, based in The Hague, Netherlands.

In the fall of 2005, Justice Inés Weinberg de Roca transferred back to the ICTR and was the Presiding Judge in the trials of, among others, Protais Zigiranyirazo, known as “Mr. Z”, and Simon Bikindi. In December 2008 she delivered the judgments in the cases of Bikindi and Zigiranyirazo.

In 2009, the United Nations General Assembly appointed Justice Weinberg de Roca as a judge of the United Nations Appeals Tribunal for the 2009-2016 period. She was the first President of the Tribunal (2009-2010). However, in November 2009 her conviction of Zigiranyirazo was overturned by the Appeal Chamber of the ICTR, which acquitted him on all charges and found that Weinberg de Roca had made serious errors and that there had been a miscarriage of justice. This came as a severe blow to her international credibility.

== Publications ==
- Derecho Internacional Privado: Buenos Aires, De Palma 1997; 2nd ed.: Lexis Nexis 2002; 3rd ed: Lexis Nexis 2004, 4th ed.: Abeledo- Perrot 2011.
- Competencia internacional y ejecución de sentencias extranjeras, Buenos Aires, Astrea 1994.
- Sentencing and Incarceration in the Ad Hoc Tribunals, (in collaboration with Christopher M. Rassi), Stanford Journal of International Law 2008, vol. 44.
- The influence of national proceedings against War Criminals after World War II on the jurisprudence of the ICTY and Vice Versa, Historische Dimensionen von Kriegsverbrecherprozessen nach dem Zweiten Weltkrieg, Hsg. Radtke, Rössner, Schiller und Form, Nomos/Dike 2007, p. 61.
- Ten Years and Counting: The Development of International Law at the ICTR, New England Journal of International and Comparative Law, volume 12, 2005, number 1, p. 69.
- Conflict of Jurisdictions vs. Conflict of Laws, International Cooperation Through Private International Law, Essays in Memory of Peter E. Nygh, T.M.C. Asser Press, 2004, p. 489.
- Private International Law in a Global World, Festschrift für Erik Jayme, Sellier 2004.
