= United Nations Security Council Resolution 1855 =

UN Security Council Resolution 1855
- Date: 19 December 2008
- Meeting no.: 6,052
- Code: S/RES/1855 (Document)
- Subject: International Humanitarian Law Committed in the Territory of Rwanda
- Voting summary: 15 voted for; None voted against; None abstained
- Result: Adopted

Security Council composition
- Permanent members: China; France; Russia; United Kingdom; United States
- Non-permanent members: Burkina Faso; Belgium; Costa Rica; Croatia; Indonesia; Italy; Libya; Panama; South Africa; Vietnam

United Nations Security Council Resolution 1855 was unanimously adopted on 19 December 2008.

== Resolution ==
Seeking to have the International Criminal Tribunal for Rwanda complete trials and conduct additional ones as soon as possible in order to meet its completion strategy, the Security Council today decided that the Secretary-General might appoint up to three additional ad litem judges that would, from time to time, temporarily exceed the maximum of nine provided for in the Court’s Statute.

Unanimously adopting resolution 1855 (2008) under Chapter VII, the Council decided that the above provision would be in place until 31 December 2009. It also decided to amend article 11, paragraph 2, of the Statute of the International Tribunal as set out in the annex to this resolution.

(Article 11, concerning the Chambers’ composition, says that each Trial Chamber may be divided into sections of three judges each. A section of a Trial Chamber shall have the same powers and responsibilities as a Trial Chamber under the present Statute and shall render judgment in accordance with the same rules.)

The Council took note of the letter to the Council President from the Secretary-General attaching the letter to him from the President of the International Tribunal dated 10 December (document S/2008/799), and had considered the proposals on the issue made by the Tribunal’s President.

== See also ==
- List of United Nations Security Council Resolutions 1801 to 1900 (2008–2009)
