= United Nations Security Council Resolution 1901 =

UN Security Council Resolution 1901
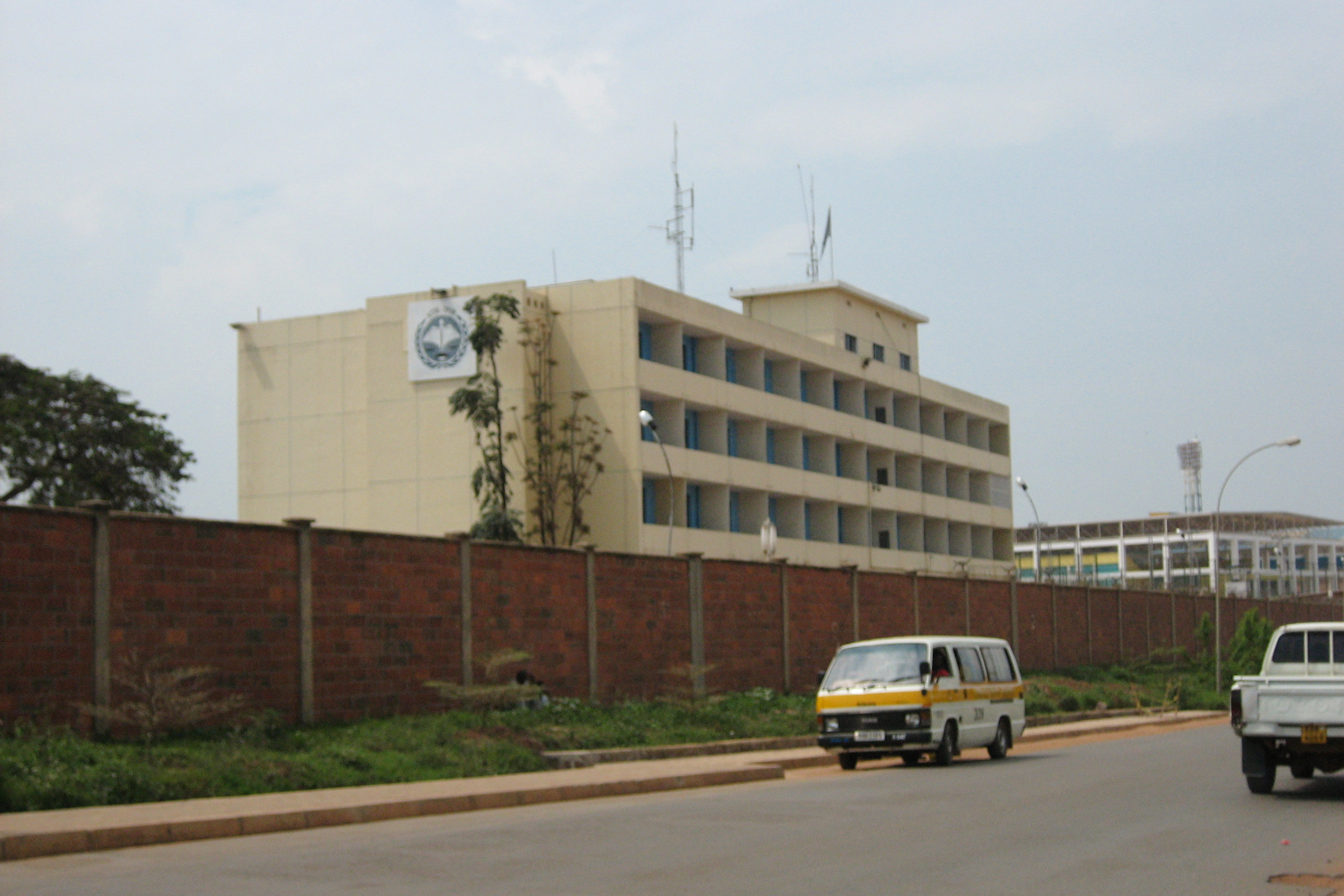
- ICTR building in Kigali, Rwanda
- Date: 16 December 2009
- Meeting no.: 6,243
- Code: S/RES/1901 (Document)
- Subject: International Criminal Tribunal for Rwanda
- Voting summary: 15 voted for; None voted against; None abstained
- Result: Adopted

Security Council composition
- Permanent members: China; France; Russia; United Kingdom; United States
- Non-permanent members: Austria; Burkina Faso; Costa Rica; Croatia; Japan; Libya; Mexico; Turkey; Uganda; Vietnam

United Nations Security Council Resolution 1901, adopted unanimously on December 16, 2009, after recalling previous resolutions, including 935 (1994), 1503 (2003) and 1534 (2004), the Council noted that the International Criminal Tribunal for Rwanda will not complete its work in 2010.

The resolution goes to extend the mandate for all trial judges at the Tribunal until 30 June 2010 and appeal judges until 31 December 2012, requesting the President of the Tribunal to submit a schedule of all cases and any extension on the mandate of judges. The Council also temporarily modifies Article 11 of Paragraph 1 of the Statute of the International Tribunal to increase the number of ad litem judges serving at the Tribunal from nine to twelve.

== See also ==
- List of United Nations Security Council Resolutions 1901 to 2000 (2009–2011)
- Rwandan genocide
