= Mehmet Güney =

Turkish diplomat and judge (1936-2024)

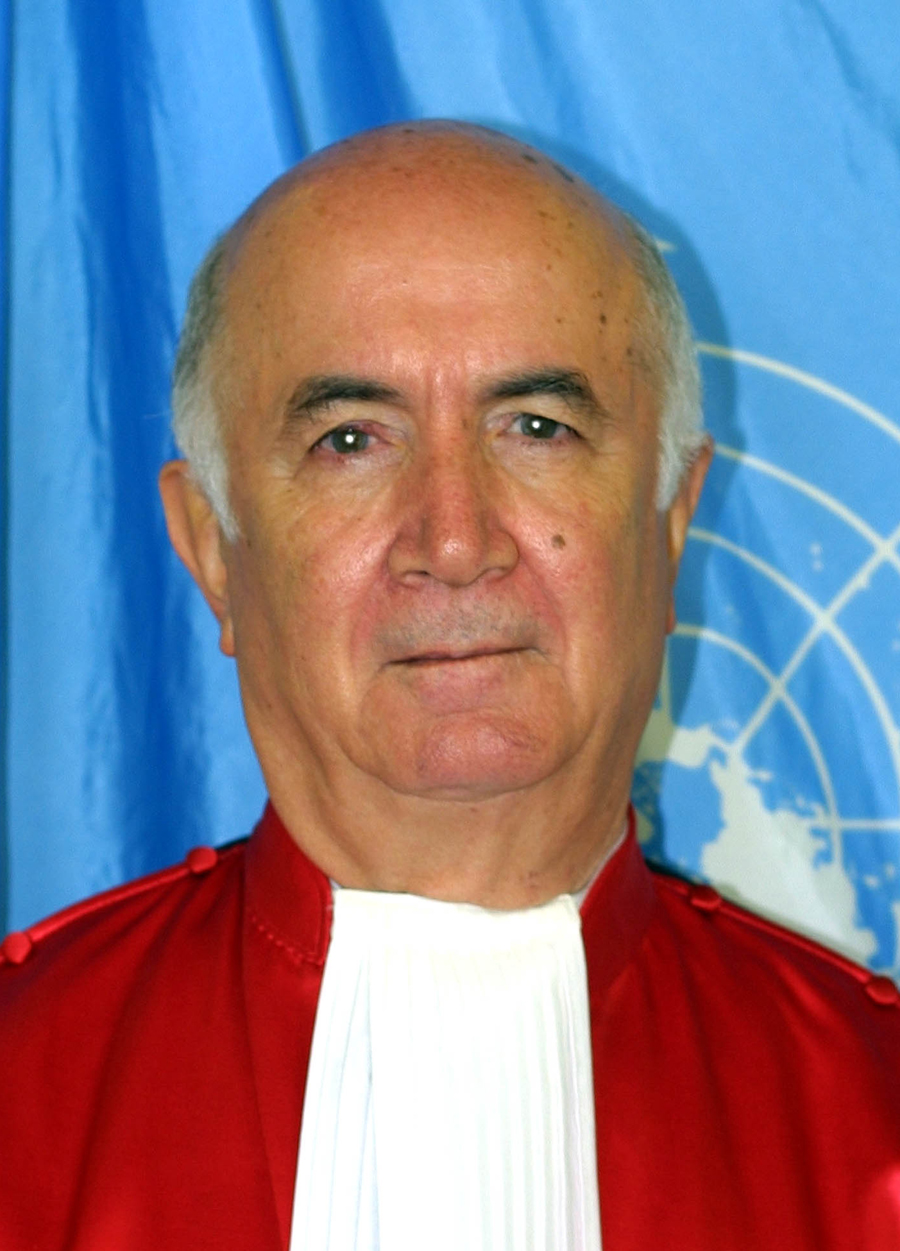
- Mehmet Güney in 2014

Judge of the International Criminal Tribunal for Rwanda
- In office 3 November 1998 – 30 April 2015

Personal details
- Born: 3 May 1936 Siirt, Turkey
- Died: 24 April 2024 (aged 87)
- Occupation: judge and diplomat

Mehmet Güney (3 May 1936 – 24 April 2024) was an international judge and a Turkish diplomat.

== Biography ==
=== Education ===
Between 1954 and 1959, Mehmet Güney studied at the faculty of political science, then at the law faculty, of the Ankara University. He graduated from the Institute of Public Administration, and from the Nancy-Université in France.

=== International career ===
In 1970, Güney participated to the first special session of the Commission on Narcotic Drugs, and to the 28th Human rights commission in 1971. He was elected judge of the International Criminal Tribunal for Rwanda on 3 November 1998 and served in that role until 30 April 2015.

== Personal life ==
Mehmet Güney was married and has three children.
