= Kamonyi District =

Coordinates: 2°00′S 29°54′E

- District
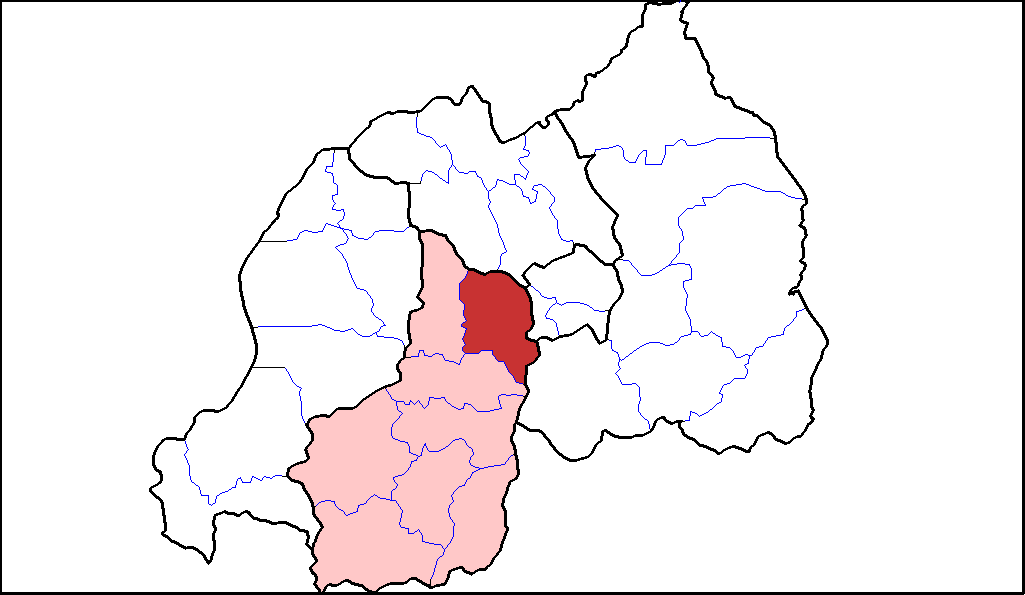
- Shown within Southern Province and Rwanda
- Country: Rwanda
- Province: Southern
- Capital: Gihinga

Area
  - District: 655.4 km^{2} (253.1 sq mi)

Population (2022 census)
  - District: 450,849
  - Density: 687.9/km^{2} (1,782/sq mi)
  - Urban: 142,520
  - Rural: 308,329

Kamonyi is a district (akarere) in Southern Province, Rwanda. Its capital is Kamonyi, also sometimes known as Gihinga.

== Sectors ==
Kamonyi district is divided into 12 sectors (imirenge): Gacurabwenge, Karama, Kayenzi, Kayumbu, Mugina, Musambira, Ngamba, Nyamiyaga, Nyarubaka, Rugalika, Rukoma and Runda.

== Sources ==
- "Districts of Rwanda". Statoids.
- Inzego.doc — Province, District and Sector information from MINALOC, the Rwanda ministry of local government.
