= United Nations Security Council Resolution 1165 =

United Nations Security Council resolution

UN Security Council Resolution 1165
- Date: 30 April 1998
- Meeting no.: 3,877
- Code: S/RES/1165 (Document)
- Subject: The International Tribunal for Rwanda
- Voting summary: 15 voted for; None voted against; None abstained
- Result: Adopted

Security Council composition
- Permanent members: China; France; Russia; United Kingdom; United States
- Non-permanent members: Bahrain; Brazil; Costa Rica; Gabon; Gambia; Japan; Kenya; Portugal; Slovenia; Sweden

United Nations Security Council resolution 1165, adopted unanimously on 30 April 1998, after recalling Resolution 955 (1994), the council established a third trial chamber at the International Criminal Tribunal for Rwanda (ICTR).

The security council recalled that Resolution 955 allowed for increasing the number of trial chambers and judges at the ICTR. It reaffirmed that the prosecution of those responsible for the violations of international humanitarian law in Rwanda would help contribute towards peace and reconciliation. There was also a need to strengthen the Rwandan judicial system as there were many people awaiting trial.

Acting under Chapter VII of the United Nations Charter, the council established a third trial chamber at the ICTR and that elections to the trial chambers would take place on the same date, for a term of office that would expire on 24 May 2003. The judges would commence their terms of office as soon as possible following the elections. Further efficiencies were encouraged at the ICTR and the Secretary-General Kofi Annan was requested to make arrangements to facilitate the effective functioning of the Tribunal.

== See also ==
- List of United Nations Security Council Resolutions 1101 to 1200 (1997–1998)
- Rwandan genocide
- United Nations Observer Mission Uganda–Rwanda
