= Rape during the First and Second Congo Wars =

Genocidal rape in Congo

During the first and second conflicts in the Democratic Republic of the Congo (DRC), all armed parties to the conflict carried out a policy of genocidal rape, with the primary purpose being the total destruction of communities and families. Such was the violence directed at and carried out towards women that Human Rights Watch (HRW) described it as "a war within a war". HRW has reported that as of March 2013, civil conflict had reignited when the militia, March 23 Movement (M23), resumed hostilities following a ceasefire.

Girls from the age of five to women aged eighty have been assaulted and sexually mutilated. Others were raped and their families forced to watch. (Note: "Human Rights Watch described the extraordinary brutality of the DRC rapes – girls as young as five and women as old as eighty were reportedly shot in the vagina or mutilated with knives and razor blades") By 2008 the United Nations (UN) had estimated that up to 200,000 females had suffered from some form of sexual violence. The brutality of the rapes have caused long-term health, social, familial, and psychological problems. There have been reports of infants aged one being raped, as well as women in their nineties. Médecins Sans Frontières (MSF) reported that over 50 percent of survivors believed that the use of rape was a deliberate tactic used for the extermination of the Congolese people.

While females have been the primary victims of sexual violence, men and boys are also sexually assaulted. In 2009, several non-governmental organizations including HRW and Amnesty International (AI) reported that the rape of males in the DRC was systematic, and on the increase. The majority of the rapes have been carried out by militias, such as the Lord's Resistance Army, the Democratic Forces for the Liberation of Rwanda, the Mai-Mai and the Congrès national pour la défense du peuple. Since 2009, rapes, killings and human rights violations carried out by the armed forces (FARDC) of the DRC have increased.

== Rape as genocide ==
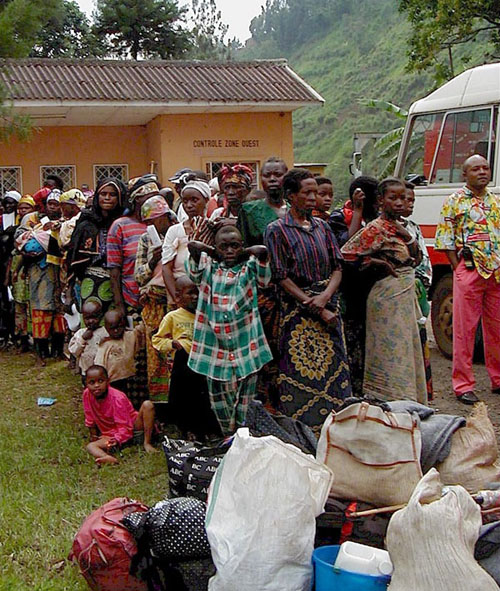
"Photo: USAID/Leah Werchick; Rape victims who have been successfully reintegrated into their communities assemble in a "peace hut" near Walungu, South Kivu in DRC."

According to Amnesty International, the use of rape during times of war is not a by-product of conflicts, but a pre-planned and deliberate military strategy. In the last quarter of a century, the majority of conflicts have shifted from wars between nation states to communal and intrastate civil wars. During these conflicts the use of rape as a weapon against the civilian population by state and non-state actors has become more frequent. Journalists and human rights organizations have documented campaigns of genocidal rape during the conflicts in the Balkans, Sierra Leone, Rwanda, Liberia, Sudan, Uganda, and the DRC.

The strategic aim of these mass rapes are twofold. The first is to instill terror in the civilian population, with the intent to forcibly dislocate them from their property. The second is to degrade the chance of possible return and reconstitution by inflicting humiliation and shame on the targeted population. These effects are strategically important for non-state actors, as it is necessary for them to remove the targeted population from the land. Rape as genocide is well suited for campaigns which involve ethnic cleansing and genocide, as the objective is to destroy or forcefully remove the target population, and ensure they do not return.

In the DRC the genocidal rape was focused on the destruction of family and communities. An interview with a survivor gave an account of gang rape, forced cannibalism of a fetus taken from an eviscerated woman and child murder.

== Estimates of victims ==
In 2006 Jean-Marie Guéhenno reported to the UN that in the preceding six months 12,000 women and girls had been raped. In 2009 it was estimated that there were 1100 rapes per month, with 72 per cent of survivors stating they had been tortured during their assaults. In 2011 alone it was estimated that there were up to 400,000 rapes. In 2013 HRW reported that M23 had killed 44 civilians and had raped at least 61 women and girls near the city of Goma.

An article in the American Journal of Public Health gave an estimate of two million victims of rape by 2011. According to statistics of rape victims shown to Shelly Whitman during a visit to Panzi Hospital in Bukavu in 2010, 66 girls under the age of three and 50 women over the age of 65 had been admitted to the hospital for treatment due to sexual violence between January and July 2010. Statistics provided by local health centres show that 13 per cent of all survivors were under fourteen years old. The HRW operative to the DRC, Anneke Van Woudenberg, has said of the widespread use of rape that "it has become a defining characteristic" of the conflict.

== Aftermath ==
HRW reported that girls aged five to women aged eighty were assaulted with exceptional brutality, with knives and razor blades being used to mutilate the vagina. Families were forced to watch women being sexually assaulted. Survivors of the attacks have reported major health issues as a result of the rapes. 87 percent reported vaginal discharge and 79 percent have reported lower abdominal pains. Fistulas were commonplace among survivors, 41 percent reported the discharge of fecal and urinary matter from the vagina.

Psychological trauma includes nightmares and insomnia, with 77 percent reporting that they suffered from these. 91 percent of survivors reported that they lived in fear and felt ashamed over the assaults. At the Saint Paul Health Center in Uvira, in a review of medical records from 658 survivors nine percent returned positive for HIV. Other sexual infections were syphilis, with thirteen percent infected, and a further 31 percent were infected with gonorrhea. Few victims seek medical attention, due to the costs associated with health care, and also due to the fact that should it become publicly known that they were raped, these survivors would then be socially stigmatized.

In a report from MSF over 50 per cent of survivors indicated they had been assaulted while at work in the fields. These assaults were usually carried out by groups of men who were armed, women were beaten then raped and left lying on the ground. Others stated they had been assaulted during raids on their villages and a large number of women stated they had been raped in the undergrowth where they had gone to hide when they fled their homes.

When surveyed on their opinions as to the motivation behind the sexual violence, 83 per cent believed that poor organization, training and a lack of discipline played a contributing role. 57 per cent believed that the sexual violence was used as a tactic for the deliberate extermination of the Congolese people, from the witness statements MSF came to the conclusion that the "Sexual violence has been so clearly linked to the military strategy of warring parties and has occurred in such a systematic way that it is wrong to think of it as a side effect of war"

== War crimes trials ==
In 2013 a mass trial of 39 FARDC soldiers began. The men were accused of raping 102 women and 33 girls in the township of Minova following their retreat from Goma after an attack by M23 forces. In 2014 the trial concluded with two convictions for rape and the remaining cleared. Maud Jullien, who works for the BBC has said the result is a "great disappointment", and lawyers for the survivors believe the ruling will result in discouraging other survivors from coming forward.

== International and domestic reactions ==
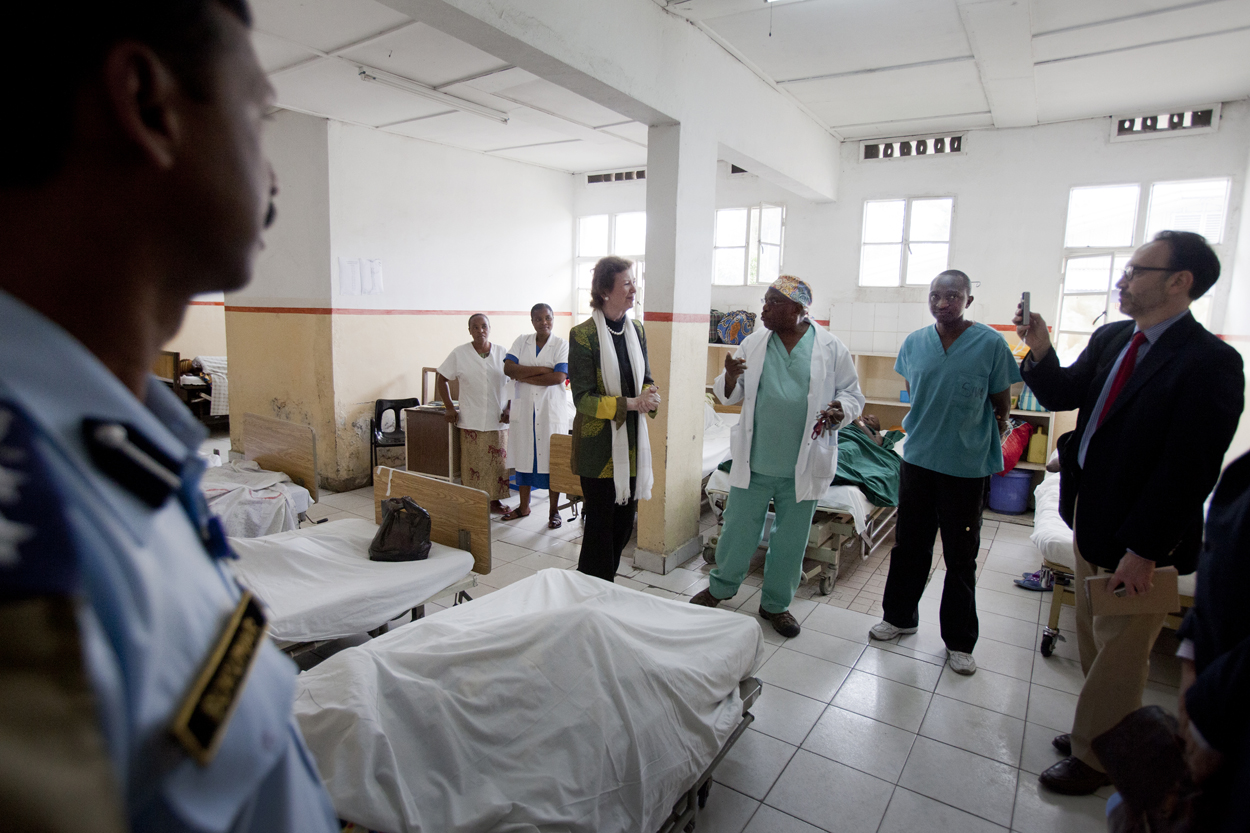
Mary Robinson, the UN Special Envoy for the Great Lakes Region visiting a hospital in Goma where she was guided through the Heal Africa section which assists victims of sexual violence.

The United Nations has stated that the DRC is the centre for the use of rape as a weapon of war, with one study finding that 48 women are raped every hour. In 2009 Eve Ensler travelled to the DRC, and having spoken to survivors of their need for a place to heal proposed the, City of Joy. In 2011, V-Day, in association with Fondation Panzi (DRC), opened the City of Joy. The centre is located in Bukavu, and treats 180 survivors of gender related violence per year.

Leah Chishugi, a survivor of the Rwandan genocide, traveled to the DRC. Upon discovering the mass rapes which were ongoing she began to document testimony from survivors. In a two-month period she interviewed up to 500 survivors of sexual assaults. The youngest victim was just one year old, and the eldest was 90 and one victim, aged 14, had already given birth twice, having been forcibly impregnated. Chishugi founded the charity Everything is a Benefit which campaigns on behalf of the survivors of the victims of rape and other human rights abuses during civil conflicts.

In 1997, doctor Rachel Kembe, with five other professional women founded the Association nationale des mamans pour l'aide aux déshérités (ANAMAD, National Mothers' Association to Aid the Dispossessed). By 2007 the centre was treating 2500 survivors of rape, but Kembe has said "the number keeps growing". ANAMAD has constructed housing for up to 30 IDPs and their families, but says they require more funding as their resources are inadequate.

Denis Mukwege and his co-workers have treated an estimated 30,000 survivors of rape since the start of the conflicts. He has reported that women have been shot in the genitals following an assault, and others have had chemicals poured over their genitals following rapes. He believes the use of rape is an "effective strategy" as people are forced to flee their homes and land.

Documentary maker, Fiona Lloyd-Davies, released Seeds of Hope at the Global Summit to End Sexual Violence in Conflict.

== See also ==
- Sexual violence in the Democratic Republic of the Congo
- Women in the Democratic Republic of the Congo
- Rape during the Sierra Leone Civil War
- Rape during the Rwandan genocide

== Bibliography ==
- Adetunji, Jo (12 May 2011). "Forty-eight women raped every hour in Congo, study finds". The Guardian.
- Akurang-Parry, Kwabena O. (2004). "African Women and Girls". In Merril D. Smith (ed.). Encyclopedia of Rape. Greenwood. pp. 7–11. ISBN 978-0-313-32687-5.
- "DR Congo rape trial: Many soldiers cleared, two guilty". BBC. 5 May 2014.
- Bekele, Daniel (22 July 2013). "DR Congo: M23 Rebels Kill, Rape Civilians: New Evidence of Rwandan Support for M23". Human Rights Watch.
- Corrêa, Sonia; Petchesky, Rosalind; Parker, Richard (2008). "The Promises and Limits of Sexual Rights". Sexuality, Health and Human Rights. Routledge. pp. 149–218. ISBN 978-0-415-35118-8.
- Csete, Joanne; Kippenberg, Juliane (2002). The War Within The War Sexual Violence Against Women and Girls in Eastern Congo (PDF). Human Rights Watch. ISBN 1-56432-276-9.
- Drumond, Paula (2011). "Invisible Males: The Congolese Genocide". In Adam Jones (ed.). New Directions in Genocide Research. Routledge. ISBN 978-0-415-49597-4.
- Guéhenno, Jean-Marie (26 October 2006). "Statement by Jean-Marie Guéhenno". United Nations.
- Kimani, Mary (15 January 2007). "Congolese women confront legacy of rape". Africa Renewal.
- Kreinin, Tamara; Esteva, C Garcia Moreno; Pfaff, Donald W.; Lusweti, Sellah; Suleiman Shauri, Halimu (2012). "Violence: Adaptive Regulated Aggression Contrasted with Violence Against Women". In Karin Schenck-Gustafsson; Paula R. DeCola; Donald W. Pfaff; David S. Pisetsky (eds.). Handbook of Clinical Gender Medicine. Karger. pp. 99–124. ISBN 978-3-8055-9929-0.
- Leaning, Jennifer; Bartels, Susan; Mowafi, Hani (2009). "Sexual Violence during War and Forced Migration". In Susan Forbes Martin; John Tirman (eds.). Women, Migration, and Conflict: Breaking a Deadly Cycle. Springer. pp. 173–199. ISBN 978-90-481-2824-2.
- Lloyd-Davies, Fiona (24 May 2013). "Rape in DR Congo: Victims and Torturers". Pulitzer Center.
- Mukengere Mukwege, Denis; Cathy Nangini (2009). "Rape with Extreme Violence: The New Pathology in South Kivu, Democratic Republic of Congo". PLOS Medicine. 6 (12) e1000204. doi:10.1371/journal.pmed.1000204. PMC 2791171. PMID 20027215.
- Mukwege, Denis (19 February 2013). "Denis Mukwege: The rape surgeon of DR Congo". BBC.
- Peterman, Amber; Palermo, Tia; Bredenkamp, Caryn (2011). "Estimates and Determinants of Sexual Violence Against Women in the Democratic Republic of Congo". American Journal of Public Health. 101 (6): 1060–1067. doi:10.2105/AJPH.2010.300070. PMC 3093289. PMID 21566049.
- Poloni-Staudinger, Lori; Ortbals, Candice D. (2012). "Rape as a Weapon of War and Genocide". Terrorism and Violent Conflict: Women's Agency, Leadership, and Responses. Springer. ISBN 978-1-4614-5640-7.
- Sackur, Stephen (17 December 2008). "Leah Chishugi". BBC.
- Sauer, Maddy (12 June 2013). "'When we rape we feel free': Congo soldiers' shocking stories". MSN News. Archived from the original on 1 July 2014.
- Smith-Spark, Laura (8 December 2004). "How did rape become a weapon of war?". British Broadcasting Corporation.
- Taylor, Diane (5 December 2008). "Aged one to 90, the victims of hidden war against women". the Guardian.
- Viner, Katharine (9 April 2011). "City of Joy: New hope for Congo's brutalised women". The Guardian.
- Von Joeden-Forgey, Elisa (2010). "Gender and Genocide". In Donald Bloxham, A. Dirk Moses (ed.). The Oxford Handbook of Genocide Studies. Oxford University Press. pp. 61–80. ISBN 978-0-19-923211-6.
- Whitman, Shelly (2012). Schnurr, Matthew A; Swatuk, Larry A. (eds.). Natural Resources and Social Conflict: Towards Critical Environmental Security. Palgrave Macmillan. pp. 128–150. ISBN 978-0-230-29783-8.
