= Rape during the Rwandan genocide =

During the Rwandan genocide of 1994, over the course of 100 days, up to half a million women and children were raped, sexually mutilated, or murdered. The International Criminal Tribunal for Rwanda (ICTR) handed down the first conviction for the use of rape as a weapon of war during the civil conflict, and, because the intent of the mass violence against Rwandan women and children was to destroy, in whole or in part, a particular ethnic group, it was the first time that mass rape during wartime was found to be an act of genocidal rape. (Note: "... any of the following acts committed with intent to destroy, in whole or in part, a national, ethnical, racial or religious group, as such: (a) Killing members of the group; (b) Causing serious bodily or mental harm to members of the group; (c) Deliberately inflicting on the group conditions of life calculated to bring about its physical destruction in whole or in part; (d) Imposing measures intended to prevent births within the group; (e) Forcibly transferring children of the group to another group. Convention on the Prevention and Punishment of the Crime of Genocide, Article 2")

The mass rapes were carried out by the Interahamwe militia and members of the Hutu civilian population, both male and female, the Rwandan military, and the Rwandan Presidential Guard. The sexual violence was directed at the national and local levels by political and military leaders in the furtherance of their goal, the destruction of the Tutsi ethnic group.

There was extensive use of propaganda through both print and radio to incite violence against women, with both mediums being used to portray Tutsi women as untrustworthy, and as acting against the Hutu majority. The conflict resulted in an estimated 2,000 to 10,000 "war babies" being born as a result of forced impregnation.

== Rape as a weapon of genocide ==
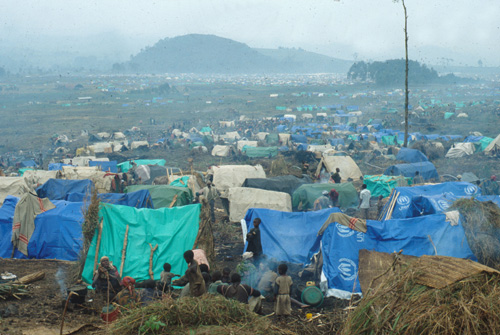
Refugee camp for Rwandans in Kimbumba, eastern Zaire (current Democratic Republic of the Congo), following the Rwandan genocide

During the conflict Hutu extremists released hundreds of patients from hospitals, who were suffering from AIDS, and formed them into "rape squads". The intent was to infect and cause a "slow, inexorable death". Obijiofor Aginam argues that while throughout history sexual violence against women is replete with such incidents of rape during times of war, more recent conflicts have seen the use of rape as a weapon of war become a "conspicuous phenomenon". He believes that the deliberate infection of women with HIV is evidenced from survivors testimony. Françoise Nduwimana documented testimony from survivors of rape, recounting the testimony of one woman:

For 60 days, my body was used as a thoroughfare for all the hoodlums, militia men and soldiers in the district ... Those men completely destroyed me; they caused me so much pain. They raped me in front of my six children ... Three years ago, I discovered I had HIV/AIDS. There is no doubt in my mind that I was infected during these rapes.

Aginam argues that these testimonies provide proof that there was a clear intent by the rapists to infect women with HIV.

Survivors have testified that the transmission of the HIV virus was a deliberate act by talking about how the men, before they raped them, would say that they were not going to kill them directly but rather give them a slow death from AIDS. Two-thirds of a sample of 1,200 Rwandan genocide widows tested positive for HIV, and the infection rates in rural areas more than doubled after the genocide. There is no data on the number of victims who died from AIDS after 1994 who had contracted the disease from having been raped during the genocide.

Although Tutsi women were the main targets, moderate Hutu women were also raped during the genocide. Along with the Hutu moderates, Hutu women who were married to Tutsis and Hutu women who hid Tutsis were targeted. In a testimonial, Maria Louise Niyobuhungiro recalls seeing local people and Hutu men watch her get raped up to five times a day, and that when she was kept under watch by a woman, she received neither sympathy nor help and was also forced to farm between rapes.

Tutsi women were also targeted with the intent of destroying their reproductive capabilities. Sexual mutilation sometimes occurred after the rape and included mutilation of the vagina with machetes, knives, sharpened sticks, boiling water, and acid. The genocidaires also held women as sex slaves for weeks.

Major Brent Beardsley, assistant to Dallaire, gave testimony at the ICTR. When asked about the sexual violence he had witnessed, he stated that the killing blows tended to be aimed at the reproductive organs, and that the victims had been deliberately slashed on the breasts and vagina. Beardsley also testified to having seen the bodies of girls as young as six and seven who had been raped so brutally that their vaginas were split and swollen from what had obviously been gang rapes. He concluded by saying "Massacres kill the body. Rape kills the soul. And there was a lot of rape. It seemed that everywhere we went, from the period of 19th of April until the time we left, there was rape everywhere near these killing sites."

== Estimates of victims ==
Research has suggested that nearly every female survivor over twelve years of age had been a victim of rape. According to U.N. Special Rapporteur, René Degni-Ségui, "Rape was the rule, and its absence the exception".

In 1996, Degni-Segui estimated that the number of women and girls raped was between 250,000 and 500,000. Degni-Segui's estimate was arrived at after he evaluated rape cases which had been documented and the number of resulting war babies. Degni-Segui believed that the 15,700 rape incidents reported by the Rwanda Ministry for Family and Protection of Women were most likely an underestimate, given the number of years victims would take to report their rapes, if ever they did. He also discovered that the estimates by medical personnel of one birth per 100 rapes did not include women who had been murdered. He said of the atrocities, "Rape was systematic and was used as a 'weapon' by the perpetrators of the massacres. This can be estimated from the number and nature of the victims as well as from the forms of rape."

Bijleveld, Morssinkhof, and Smeulers estimated 354,440 women raped. They examined the testimonies of the victims, and also the number of those who had been forcibly impregnated; these were then added to the known amount of those who had been raped, but had been killed. They stated that "Almost all surviving Tutsi women were raped."

== Use of propaganda ==
1994 cartoon printed in Kangura and written in Kinyarwanda: "General Dallaire and his army have fallen into the trap of Tutsi Femmes fatales."

Hutu propaganda played an important role in both the genocide and the gender-specific violence. It often depicted Tutsi women as "a sexually seductive 'fifth column' in league with the Hutus' enemies". The brutality of the sexual violence, and complicity of Hutu women in the attacks, suggested that the propaganda was effective at mobilizing both females and males to participate in the genocide. However, the complicity of Hutu women may also be attributed to fear that they may also become a victim of such violence.

One of the first victims was Agathe Uwilingiyimana, who had been the first woman to hold the post of prime minister. For the twelve months preceding the genocide, she had been portrayed in extremist political literature and propaganda as being a threat to the nation, and as sexually promiscuous.

Early in 1990, over a dozen newspapers were launched, in either Kinyarwanda or French methodically exploited ethnic tensions. In December 1990, the newspaper Kangura printed the Hutu Ten Commandments of which four dealt specifically with women. (Note: Every Hutu should know that a Tutsi woman, wherever she is, works for the interest of her Tutsi ethnic group. As a result, we shall consider a traitor any Hutu who: marries a Tutsi woman; befriends a Tutsi woman; employs a Tutsi woman as a secretary or a concubine.; Every Hutu should know that our Hutu daughters are more suitable and conscientious in their role as woman, wife and mother of the family. Are they not beautiful, good secretaries and more honest?; Hutu women, be vigilant and try to bring your husbands, brothers and sons back to reason.; The Rwandese Armed Forces should be exclusively Hutu. The experience of the October [1990] war has taught us a lesson. No member of the military shall marry a Tutsi.) On 29 January 1992, Kangura accused Tutsi women of having a monopoly on employment in both the private and public sectors, saying that they would hire their "Tutsi sisters on the basis of their thin noses" (a stereotypical 'Tutsi feature').

Kangura requested that all Hutu be vigilant against the Tutsi, who they called Inyenzi (cockroaches), as well as those considered accomplices. In an interview with Human Rights Watch one Hutu woman stated, "According to the propaganda, the Tutsi were hiding the enemy. And their beautiful women were being used to do it. So, everybody knew what that meant." Cartoons in print media represented Tutsi women as being sexually provocative. One printed by Kangura depicted the head of the UN peace-keeping forces in an amorous position with two Tutsi women; the caption read, "General Dallaire and his men have fallen into the trap of Femme fatales". Another image portrayed Tutsi women having sex with three Belgian paratroopers. Using both printed press and the Radio Télévision Libre des Mille Collines (RTLMC), propagandists portrayed Tutsi women as "devious seductresses who would undermine the Hutu". Members of the military were barred from marrying Tutsi women, and Tutsi women were portrayed as arrogant, ugly and viewing Hutu men as inferior.

== Aftermath ==
Survivors found themselves stigmatized, often denied their rights to property and inheritance as well as opportunities for employment. It is estimated by the National Population Office of Rwanda that between 2,000 and 5,000 children were born as a result of forced impregnation. However, victims groups believe this is underestimated and the number exceeds 10,000. These children are themselves stigmatized and referred to as les enfants mauvais souvenir (children of bad memories) or enfants indésirés (lit. "unwanted children", glossed as "children of hate" by M. Mukangendo).

Victims also suffered from survivor's guilt, and anxiety due to their assailants not being held accountable. In 1995, widows of the genocide founded Association des Veuves du Genocide (AVEGA, Widows of the Genocide of April) to see to the needs of female survivors who had been widowed or raped. The extent of the rapes was quickly recognized by human rights groups, with one report, Shattered Lives: Sexual Violence During the Rwandan Genocide and Its Aftermath written by Binaifer Nowrojee, becoming one of the most highly cited human rights reports in up to thirty years.

== War crimes trials ==
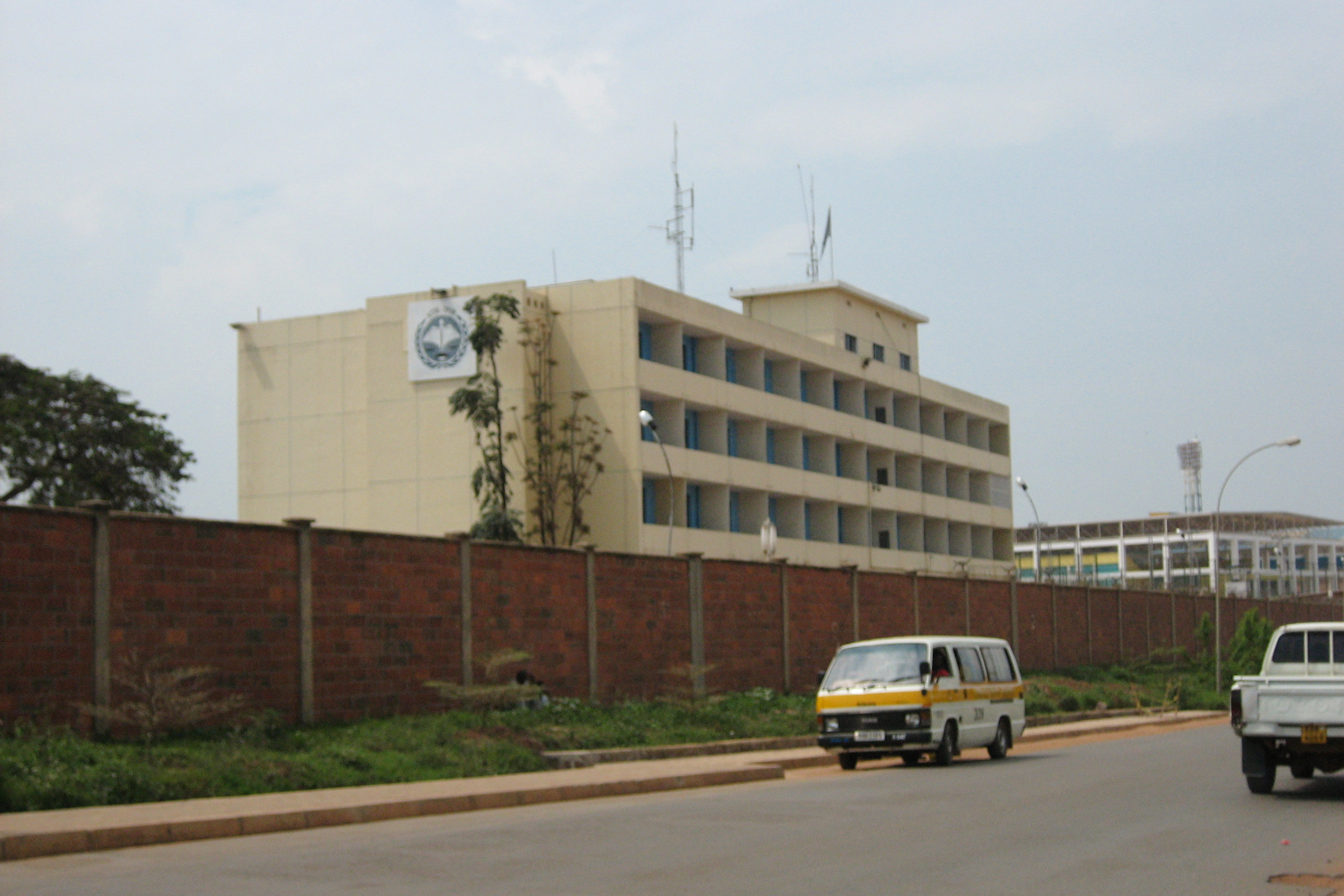
An ICTR building in Kigali

Evidence presented to the ICTR revealed Hutu political leaders ordered the mass rapes be carried out.

Jean-Paul Akayesu became the first person convicted for using rape as form of genocide. Initially, gender based violence had not been included in the indictment against Akayesu; however, following pressure by non-governmental organizations (NGOs), the indictment was amended. During the trial of Akayesu, the ICTR affirmed that sexual violence, including rape, fell under paragraph B of the Convention on the Prevention and Punishment of the Crime of Genocide, as the rapes had been carried out with the sole intent to destroy, in whole or in part, a specific group.

The ICTR also found that the sexual violence against Tutsi women was a systematic part of the genocide. To this extent, the finding against Akayesu, that rape can be an act of genocide, represented a major change in international jurisprudence and prosecutions of genocide. On 2 September 1998, Akayesu was sentenced to life imprisonment after being found guilty of genocide and crimes against humanity, including rape.

The first woman charged for genocidal rape was Pauline Nyiramasuhuko, a politician, who was the Minister for Family Welfare and the Advancement of Women during the conflict. The ICTR found that

Between 19 April and late June 1994 Nyiramasuhuko, Ntahobali, Interahamwe and soldiers went to the BPO to abduct hundreds of Tutsis; the Tutsi refugees were physically assaulted and raped; and the Tutsi refugees were killed in various locations throughout Ngoma commune.

During the Media trial, Hassan Ngeze (editor-in-chief of Kangura), and Ferdinand Nahimana and Jean-Bosco Barayagwiza (founders of RTLMC) were all brought up on charges. The ICTR judged that the Hutu Ten Commandments and another article titled The Appeal to the Conscience of the Hutu conveyed "contempt and hatred for the Tutsi ethnic group, and for Tutsi women in particular as enemy agents, and called on readers to take all necessary measures to stop the enemy, defined as the Tutsi population".

== See also ==
- The Uncondemned, a 2015 documentary film
- Rape during the Congo civil wars
- Rape during the Sierra Leone Civil War

== Bibliography ==
- Aginam, Obijiofor (27 June 2012). "Rape and HIV as Weapons of War". United Nations University. Archived from the original on 14 November 2020.
- Chalk, Frank (2007). "Journalism as Genocide: the Media Trial". In Allan Thompson (ed.). The Media and the Rwanda Genocide. Pluto Press. ISBN 978-0-7453-2625-2.
- de Brouwer, Anne-Marie (2005). Supranational Criminal Prosecution of Sexual Violence: The ICC and the Practice of the ICTY and the ICTR. Intersentia. ISBN 978-90-5095-533-1.
- Drumbl, Mark A. (2012). "'She makes me ashamed to be a woman': The Genocide Conviction of Pauline Nyiramasuhuko, 2011". Michigan Journal of International Law. 2013. SSRN 2155937.
- De Brouwer, Anne-Marie (2005). Supranational Criminal Prosecution of Sexual Violence: The ICC and the Practice of the ICTY and the ICTR. Intersentia. ISBN 978-90-5095-533-1.
- De Brouwer, Anne-Marie (2010). "Introduction". In Anne-Marie De Brouwer; Sandra Ka Hon Chu (eds.). The Men Who Killed Me: Rwandan Survivors of Sexual Violence. Douglas & McIntyre. ISBN 978-1-55365-310-3.
- Eboe-Osuji, Chile (2012). International Law and Sexual Violence in Armed Conflicts. Martinus Nijhoff. ISBN 978-90-04-20262-7.
- Elbe, Stefan (2002). "HIV/AIDS and the Changing Landscape of War in Africa". International Security. 27 (2): 159–177. doi:10.1162/016228802760987851. JSTOR 3092146.
- Eltringham, Nigel (2004). Accounting For Horror Post-Genocide Debates in Rwanda. Pluto Press. ISBN 978-0-7453-2000-7.
- Fielding, Leila (2012). Female Génocidaires: What was the Nature and Motivations for Hutu Female. GRIN Verlag. ISBN 978-3-656-32440-9.
- Grunfeld, Fred (2007). The Failure to Prevent Genocide in Rwanda: The Role of Bystanders. Brill. ISBN 978-9004157811.
- Jones, Adam (2011). Gender Inclusive: Essays on Violence, Men, and Feminist International Relations. Routledge. ISBN 978-0-415-66609-1.
- Jones, Adam (2010). "Genocide and Mass Violence". In Laura J. Shepherd (ed.). Gender Matters in Global Politics. Routledge. pp. 127–147. ISBN 978-0-203-86494-4.
- Ka Hon Chu, Sandra (2010). "Maria Louise Niyobuhungiro". In Anne-Marie De Brouwer; Sandra Ka Hon Chu (eds.). The Men Who Killed Me: Rwandan Survivors of Sexual Violence. Douglas & McIntyre. pp. 29–34. ISBN 978-1-55365-310-3.
- Leatherman, Janie L. (2011). Sexual Violence and Armed Conflict. Wiley. p. 2005. ISBN 978-0745641881.
- Lynch, Jake; McGoldrick, Annabel (2010). "A Global Standard for Reporting Conflict and Peace". In Richard Keeble; John Tulloch; Florian Zollma (eds.). Peace Journalism, War and Conflict Resolution. Peter Lang. ISBN 978-1-4331-0726-9.
- Merry, Sally Engle (2008). Gender Violence: A Cultural Perspective. Wiley-Blackwell. ISBN 978-0-631-22359-7.
- Mukamana, Donatilla; Collins, Anthony (2006). "Rape survivors of the Rwandan genocide". International Journal of Critical Psychology. 17 (Special Edition: Critical Psychology in Africa). Palgrave: 140–166. ISSN 1464-0538.
- Mukangendo, Marie Consolee (2007). "Caring for Children Born of Rape in Rwanda". In R. Charli Carpenter (ed.). Born of War: Protecting Children of Sexual Violence Survivors in Conflict Zones. Kumarian. pp. 40–52. ISBN 978-1-56549-237-0.
- Nowrojee, Binaifer (1996). Shattered Lives: Sexual Violence during the Rwandan Genocide and its Aftermath. Human Rights Watch. ISBN 1-56432-208-4.
- Nowrojee, Binaifer (2007). "A Lost Opportunity for Justice: Why Did the ICTR Not Prosecute Gender Propaganda?". In Allan Thompson (ed.). The Media and the Rwanda Genocide. Pluto Press. pp. 362–374. ISBN 978-0-7453-2625-2.
- Sai, Nancy (8 February 2012). "Rwanda". Women Under Siege.
- Rittner, Carol (2009). "Rape, Religion, and Genocide: An Unholy Silence". In Steven Leonard Jacobs (ed.). Confronting Genocide: Judaism, Christianity, Islam. Lexington. pp. 291–305. ISBN 978-0-7391-3589-1.
- Schabas, William (2000). Genocide in International Law: The Crimes of Crimes. Cambridge University Press. ISBN 978-0-521-78790-1.
- Singular, Muhutu (1999). "The Voice of Extremism". In John A. Berry (ed.). Genocide in Rwanda: A Collective Memory. Howard University Press. pp. 87–122. ISBN 978-0-88258-202-3.
- Taylor, Christopher C. (2009). "Visions of the "Oppressor" in Rwanda's Pre-Genocidal Media". In Nicholas A. Robins; Adam Jones (eds.). Genocides by the Oppressed: Subaltern Genocide in Theory and Practice. Indiana University Press. ISBN 978-0-253-22077-6.
- Verwimp, Philip (2006). "Machetes and Firearms: The Organization of Massacres in Rwanda". Journal of Peace Research. 43 (1): 5–22. doi:10.1177/0022343306059576. JSTOR 27640247.
- Volkmann-Benkert, Julia (2009). "Protection of Women Against Sexual Violence in Armed Conflicts". In Klaus Hoffmann-Holland (ed.). Ethics and Human Rights in a Globalized World: An Interdisciplinary and International Approach. Mohr Siebeck. pp. 155–178. ISBN 978-3-16-149992-0.
- Walsh, Annelotte (2012). "The Girl Child". In Lisa Yarwood (ed.). Women and Transitional Justice: The Experience of Women as Participants. Routledge. ISBN 978-0-415-69911-2.
