= Child marriage in Democratic Republic of the Congo =

Child marriage in the Democratic Republic of the Congo is the eighteenth highest in the world. In a child marriage, one or both parties are under the age of eighteen years old. In the Democratic Republic of the Congo (DRC), 37% of girls are married before they turn eighteen, and 10% of girls are married before age fifteen. Though significantly less than the rate of child marriage for girls, 6% of boys in the DRC are married before age eighteen.

Even though child marriage is prevalent in the DRC, it is illegal. The legal age of marriage is eighteen. There are multiple international laws and agreements that ban the practice. However, the DRC is one of seven countries in the African Union to have signed but not ratified the African Charter on the Rights and Welfare of the Child (ACRWC), which explicitly prohibits child marriage.

Parents sometimes force their daughters into child marriage to gain financial or social status benefits. Other causes include tradition and conflict in the region which leads to higher rates of child marriage. However, child marriages have consequences, as married girls experience worse health outcomes, lower levels of education, higher rates of violence, and psychological impacts.

Many organizations and programs have been initiated to combat child marriage, especially on the international scale from the United Nations. Advocates against the ubiquity of child marriage have fought for outreach or intervention programs.

== Laws ==
=== National ===
Constitution of the Democratic Republic of the Congo

The Democratic Republic of the Congo has laws against child marriage. In the Constitution of the Democratic Republic of the Congo, men and women have the right to marry the person of their choice. Marriage is recognized as an act between a man and a woman of legal age in which both people consent. The legal age of marriage is eighteen, and the law specifically prohibits children from marrying. There are some instances in which marriages can be nullified. If a marriage occurs without the consent of both parties, or if either party is underage, the marriage must be declared null. Marriages can be contested until both partners reach the age of eighteen years old. Anyone who was influenced by violence to enter into a marriage can request an annulment. However, laws against child marriage lack enforcement in the country. Some people in the DRC are unaware of these laws, including many people in North Kivu. Other people are reluctant to bring child marriage cases to court because of the finances involved in the legal proceedings.

Even though many laws in the DRC oppose child marriage, dowry payments and the designation of husbands as the heads of households uphold child marriage. Husbands are required to pay a dowry to the family of the bride upon marriage. The dowry provides a financial incentive for families to marry their daughters off, particularly in poor rural areas. In addition to the dowry, the Family Code identifies the husband as the head of the household, with his wife legally obligated to obey him. Wives must live with their husbands and ask for permission to travel or to access family planning services. Husbands and wives are both allowed to initiate divorces, but the wife's family must repay the dowry if a divorce occurs.

=== International ===
The Democratic Republic of the Congo has signed and ratified The Convention on the Elimination of All Forms of Discrimination Against Women (CEDAW), but not ACRWC. CEDAW prohibits child marriage and more specifically, the trafficking of women in Article 6. Some consider child marriage a form of trafficking and thus, a violation of CEDAW. The Democratic Republic of the Congo signed CEDAW on July 17, 1980, and ratified it on October 17, 1986. However, the DRC has signed but not ratified the African Charter on the Rights and Welfare of the Child (ACRWC). Additionally, the DRC has not ratified the United Nations' 1962 Consent to Marriage, Minimum Age for Marriage, and Registration of Marriages. This treaty denounces any form of marriage in which full and free consent is not provided, and it also requires that participating states set laws on the minimum age requirements for marriage. However, the Consent to Marriage, Minimum Age for Marriage, and Registration of Marriages does not address child marriage explicitly.

The United Nations General Assembly passed A/RES/66/170 and designated the 11th of October as the day to end child marriage as its primary theme, making it the first International Day of the Girl Child. It recognizes the importance of empowering and investing in girls, emphasizing its impact on economic growth. It also contributes to achieving the Millennium Development Goals, including the eradication of poverty of girls and their families, which may have a domino effect in the countries where child marriage remains prevalent. The investment in and the empowerment of girls according to A/RES/66/170 also reiterates that doing so would break down gender and sexual discrimination and violence, and promote the enjoyment of human rights.

== Regional differences ==
Child marriage in the Democratic Republic of the Congo is more common in rural areas. Rural areas sustain levels of child marriage at 11.6% before the age of fifteen, and 37.3% before the age of eighteen. For example, in the province of Kwilu, some tribes have a tradition of child marriage, such as the Yansi tribe. More generally, rural areas of the country have higher rates of child marriage because families want to relieve their obligations to sustain and provide necessary living conditions for their daughters. In contrast, Kinshasa, the capital of the country, has the lowest rate of child marriage. Urban areas sustain levels of child marriage at 7.3% before the age of fifteen, and 24.8% before the age of eighteen.

== Causes ==
=== Teenage pregnancy ===
One reason for child marriage is teenage pregnancy. When a young girl becomes pregnant, her parents often force her to marry the father of her child out of fear that she is no longer a desirable wife. There are laws in Sub-Saharan Africa that permit the early marrying of children if they have become pregnant before the age of eighteen. It has been deemed culturally appropriate to marry a daughter underage to "protect" her from the societal implications and consequences of engaging in premarital sex and unplanned pregnancy.

=== Tradition ===
For some groups, marrying off a daughter after she engages in sex is a tradition. For example, in the Bashi culture, a girl must marry her boyfriend if she has sex with him. There is a metaphor used in the South Kivu province that if a girl has sex with a boy, she is considered a "nkwale", which means a quail. Quails are wild birds, indicating that girls who engage in sex before marriage have wild behavior. It is tradition for a girl to be a virgin until she gets married, and this brings respect to her and her family. If a girl spends the night at her boyfriend's house, her parents might force them to marry to preserve the reputation of the girl and her family. Additionally, in the DRC, it is a common practice for a girl to be married in the event that she is raped as an out-of-court settlement.

=== Poverty ===
Poverty is another reason girls are forced into child marriages. Disadvantaged families have an incentive to marry their daughters young because of the economic benefits that come with child marriage. When families marry their daughters off, they no longer have to provide for them. This helps families save money and provide for other children they have, mainly boys who can obtain an education and later provide for their families. Additionally, the bride's family receives money or cattle, a "bride price", from the groom’s family when their daughter is married off. Furthermore, a family may marry their daughters off to a family of higher social status or a wealthier family so that the parents may obtain a higher social status or more economic benefit.

=== Level of education ===
Girls without an education are fourteen times more likely to be married before eighteen years old than girls with higher education. This may be due to the inability of girls' families to pay for tuition due to economic constraints. In areas where higher levels of educational attainment are unlikely, child marriage occurs at higher rates. Girls who are less motivated or underperform in their educations may also be more willing to enter into early marriages because they have less to lose in regards to their educational attainment and achievements. It is also the case that the younger a girl is married, the less likely it is that she is literate.

=== Conflict and violence in the region ===
There has been violence in the region between Congolese security forces and non-state armed groups with connection to the Islamic State of Iraq and the Levant (ISIL) and al-Qaeda. Sexual violence against girls increased during the First Congo War from 1996 to 1997 and Africa's First World War from 1998 to 2003. Some girls are forced into marriage by armed combatants. Additionally, the conflict and violence in the region have exacerbated other causes of child marriage, including poverty and a lack of access to education. Parents resort to marrying their daughters off when financial challenges increase during wartime.

== Effects ==
Child marriage in the Democratic Republic of the Congo is more prevalent among girls and has a greater impact on them.

=== Health ===
Girls' health is impacted when they are married young. Girls in child marriages are more likely to get pregnant at a young age and have more children. Childbirth at such a young age can be dangerous. Girls younger than fifteen are five times more likely to die during childbirth compared to women in their twenties according to the International Center for Research on Women (ICRW). Additionally, the children of young mothers have higher rates of child mortality. Girls in child marriages are also more likely to develop obstetric fistula and HIV.

=== Education and life outcomes ===
When girls marry young, they are more likely to drop out of school and have lower literacy levels. More specifically, they are less likely to complete primary and secondary school. In many cases, dropping out of school is due to pregnancy. Girls in child marriages typically perform household and childrearing duties instead of attending school, which decreases their future opportunities. Lower levels of educational attainment can lead to decreased employment and earning opportunities. Child brides' future earnings are reduced by 9%. Additionally, daughters of uneducated child mothers are more likely to drop out of school, which repeats the cycle of low educational attainment.

=== Violence ===
Oftentimes, the age gap between girls and their husbands can lead to unequal power dynamics. Girls in child marriages experience higher rates of violence. Married girls in the DRC have higher rates of forced sex than unmarried girls. Additionally, married girls are more likely to experience domestic violence. A study in South Kivu, DRC, found that married girls face higher rates of sexual and emotional violence and forced sex. For girls in child marriages in South Kivu, the rates of sexual violence are twice as high compared to unmarried girls. Forced sex in the past year is three times as high for married girls. Lastly, married girls in South Kivu are 20% more likely to experience emotional violence.

=== Psychological effects ===
There are psychological effects of child marriage. Married girls have lower self-esteem based on the Rosenberg self-esteem scale. Married girls in the DRC are more likely to believe they would be forced to marry their rapist if they were raped. Married girls are also more likely to believe it is sometimes acceptable for a husband to beat his wife. Leaving school early can lead to social isolation and disconnection from friends, which can develop into depression and ideas of committing suicide.

== Initiatives to prevent child marriage ==
Regardless of the actions taken to prohibit child marriage on the African continent such as the ACRWC, marriage for individuals under the age of 18 is still prevalent. Further international agreements include: the UN 1962 Convention of Consent to Marriage, Minimum Age for Marriage, and Registration of Marriages; the 1979 Convention on the Elimination of All Forms of Discrimination Against Women; and the 1989 Convention on the Rights of the Child. However, child marriage remains prevalent regardless of the incentives to stop it, which include increased social skills for girls, higher levels of education, developing friendships and relationships, preventing HIV or other sexually transmitted diseases, and preventing life-threatening health concerns such as cervical cancer and susceptibility to disease.

While there have been multiple international agreements for the prevention of child marriage, vigilance is required to effectively decrease the number of child marriages. Movements to stop child marriage begin at the local level, beginning with sex education, media campaigns against child marriage, and community health outreach programs to inform citizens of the consequences of child marriage. There also needs to be preventative measures and safe sex practices.

In Sub-Saharan Africa, roughly 90% of countries have dictated that the minimum age to marry is 18, yet one-third of them permit the marriage of underage individuals with parental consent.

There are also high rates of intimate partner violence (IPV) associated with child marriage, and finding mechanisms to prevent IPV with a focus on adult survivors may aid in the reduction of child marriages as well. This might be achieved with outreach or intervention programs. Advocates for the prohibition of child marriage also argue that psychosocial well-being and self-esteem are more reasons to stop child marriage.

== See also ==
- Women in the Democratic Republic of the Congo
