= Leah Chishugi =

Tutsi author and genocide survivor

- Born: 1974 (age 51–52); Democratic Republic of the Congo
- Known for: A Long Way From Paradise: Surviving The Rwandan Genocide
- Children: 1

Leah Chishugi (born 1974) is a Tutsi survivor of the Rwandan genocide, author and humanitarian. She was the founder of the charity Everything is a Benefit, which campaigned on behalf of the survivors of the victims of rape and other human rights abuses during the first and second civil conflicts in the Democratic Republic of the Congo (DRC). The charity was created in 2009 and was dissolved in 2013.

== Biography ==
Chishugi, who has nine siblings, was at Kigali airport on 6 April 1994 when the president Juvénal Habyarimana, was assassinated.

Chishugi, who currently resides in London and works as a nurse, grew up in Goma, a city in the DRC, just inside the border with Rwanda. When she was seventeen she moved to Rwanda and married, and gave birth to a son. In 1994 she fled the genocide which was occurring in Rwanda at the time and went to Britain as a refugee. In 2008 she returned home to deliver food and medicine, and appalled by what she found, she began to interview survivors of rape in the villages she visited. Chishugi hired transport in Bukavu and then traveled to Walungu, when the road became impossible to use she walked. She has said that "The forests were littered with corpses" and over a two-month period she interviewed roughly 500 survivors of rape. She documented the ages, names and locations of where attacks had occurred, as well as the ethnicity of the perpetrators. The youngest survivor she documented was one year old, and the eldest was ninety.

In 2010 she wrote, A Long Way From Paradise: Surviving The Rwandan Genocide which is a recounting of her escape from the genocide.

== Bibliography ==
- Callaghan, Greg (29 October 2011). "Leah Chishugi". The Australian. Archived from the original on October 29, 2011.
- Chishugi, Leah (2010). A Long Way From Paradise: Surviving The Rwandan Genocide. Hachette. ISBN 978-1844086573.
- Enus, Anton (14 September 2011). "How I survived the genocide: Leah Chishugi". SBS.
- McClements, Melissa (30 October 2010). "Leah Chishugi: 'He's my cup of tea every day'". The Guardian.
- Sackur, Stephen (17 December 2008). "Leah Chishugi". BBC.
- Taylor, Diane (5 December 2008). "Aged one to 90, the victims of hidden war against women". the Guardian.
