= Yogyakarta Principles =

2006 document on human rights in the areas of sexual orientation and gender identity

The Yogyakarta Principles is a document about human rights in the areas of sexual orientation and gender identity that was published as the outcome of an international meeting of human rights groups in Yogyakarta, Indonesia, in November 2006. The principles were supplemented and expanded in 2017 to include new grounds of gender expression and sex characteristics and a number of new principles. The principles and the supplement contain a set of precepts intended to apply the standards of international human rights law to address the abuse of human rights of lesbian, gay, bisexual, transgender, and intersex (LGBTI) people. The principles have never been accepted by the United Nations (UN) and the attempt to make gender identity and sexual orientation new categories of non-discrimination has been repeatedly rejected by the General Assembly, the UN Human Rights Council and other UN bodies.

== Versions ==
=== Original 2006 Principles ===
The Principles themselves are a lengthy document addressing legal matters. A website that was established to hold the principles and to make them accessible has an overview of the principles, reproduced here in full:

- Preamble: The Preamble acknowledges human rights violations based on sexual orientation and gender identity, which undermine the integrity and dignity, establishes the relevant legal framework, and provides definitions of key terms.
- Rights to Universal Enjoyment of Human Rights, Non-Discrimination and Recognition before the Law: Principles 1 to 3 set out the principles of the universality of human rights and their application to all persons without discrimination, as well as the right of all people to recognition as a person before the law.
  - Example:
    - Laws criminalising homosexuality violate the international right to non-discrimination (decision of the UN Human Rights Committee).
- Rights to Human and Personal Security: Principles 4 to 11 address fundamental rights to life, freedom from violence and torture, privacy, access to justice and freedom from arbitrary detention, and human trafficking.
  - Examples:
    - Some nations still have laws imposing the death penalty for homosexual sex between consenting adults, despite UN resolutions specifically opposing such laws.
    - Eleven men were arrested in a gay bar and held in custody for over a year. The UN Working Group on Arbitrary Detention concluded that the men were detained in violation of international law, noting with concern that "one of the prisoners died as a result of his arbitrary detention".
- Economic, Social and Cultural Rights: Principles 12 to 18 set out the importance of non-discrimination in the enjoyment of economic, social and cultural rights, including employment, accommodation, social security, education, sexual and reproductive health including the right for informed consent and sex reassignment therapy.
  - Examples:
    - Lesbian and transgender women are at increased risk of discrimination, homelessness and violence (report of United Nations Special Rapporteur on adequate housing).
    - Girls who display same-sex affection face discrimination and expulsion from educational institutions (report of UN Special Rapporteur on the right to education).
    - The United Nations High Commissioner for Human Rights has expressed concern about laws which "prohibit gender reassignment surgery for transsexuals or require intersex persons to undergo such surgery against their will".
- Rights to Expression, Opinion and Association: Principles 19 to 21 emphasise the importance of the freedom to express oneself, one's identity and one's sexuality, without State interference based on sexual orientation or gender identity, including the rights to participate peaceably in public assemblies and events and otherwise associate in community with others.
  - Example:
    - A peaceful gathering to promote equality on the grounds of sexual orientation and gender identity was banned by authorities, and participants were harassed and intimidated by police and extremist nationalists shouting slogans such as "Let's get the fags" and "We'll do to you what Hitler did with Jews" (report of the UN Special Rapporteur on contemporary forms of racism, racial discrimination, xenophobia & related intolerance).
- Freedom of Movement and Asylum: Principles 22 and 23 highlight the rights of persons to seek asylum from persecution based on sexual orientation or gender identity.
  - Example:
    - Refugee protection should be accorded to persons facing a well-founded fear of persecution based on sexual orientation (Guidelines of the United Nations High Commissioner for Refugees).
- Rights of Participation in Cultural and Family Life: Principles 24 to 26 address the rights of persons to participate in family life, public affairs and the cultural life of their community, without discrimination based on sexual orientation or gender identity.
  - Example:
    - States have an obligation not to discriminate between different-sex and same-sex relationships in allocating partnership benefits such as survivors' pensions (decision of the UN Human Rights Committee).
- Rights of Human Rights Defenders: Principle 27 recognises the right to defend and promote human rights without discrimination based on sexual orientation and gender identity, and the obligation of States to ensure the protection of human rights defenders working in these areas.
  - Examples:
    - Human rights defenders working on sexual orientation and gender identity issues in countries and regions around the world "have been threatened, had their houses and offices raided, they have been attacked, tortured, sexually abused, tormented by regular death threats and even killed. A major concern in this regard is an almost complete lack of seriousness with which such cases are treated by the concerned authorities." (report of the Special Representative of the UN Secretary-General on Human Rights Defenders).
- Rights of Redress and Accountability: Principles 28 and 29 affirm the importance of holding rights violators accountable, and ensuring appropriate redress for those who face rights violations.
  - Example:
    - The UN High Commissioner for Human Rights has expressed concern about "impunity for crimes of violence against LGBT persons" and "the responsibility of the State to extend effective protection. The High Commissioner notes that "excluding LGBT individuals from these protections clearly violates international human rights law as well as the common standards of humanity that define us all."
- Additional Recommendations: The Principles set out 16 additional recommendations to national human rights institutions, professional bodies, funders, NGOs, the High Commissioner for Human Rights, UN agencies, treaty bodies, Special Procedures, and others.
  - Example:
    - The Principles conclude by recognising the responsibility of a range of actors to promote and protect human rights and to integrate these standards into their work. A joint statement delivered at the United Nations Human Rights Council by 54 States from four of the five UN regions on 1 December 2006, for example, urges the Human Rights Council to "pay due attention to human rights violations based on sexual orientation and gender identity" and commends the work of civil society in this area, and calls upon "all Special Procedures and treaty bodies to continue to integrate consideration of human rights violations based on sexual orientation and gender identity within their relevant mandates." As this statement recognises, and the Yogyakarta Principles affirm, effective human rights protection truly is the responsibility of all.

=== 2017 Yogyakarta Principles plus 10 ===
- Preamble: The Preamble recalls developments in international human rights law, and an intention to regularly update the Principles. It defines gender expression and sex characteristics, applies these grounds to the original Principles, recognizes the intersectionality of the grounds adopted in the Principles, and their intersectionality with other grounds.
- The Rights to State Protection: Principle 30 recognises the right to State protection from violence, discrimination and harm, including the exercise of due diligence in prevention, investigation, prosecution and remedies.
- The Right to Legal Recognition: Principle 31 calls for a right to legal recognition without reference to sex, gender, sexual orientation, gender identity, gender expression or sex characteristics, ending the superfluous inclusion of such information in identification documents.
- The Right to Bodily and Mental Integrity: Principle 32 recognizes a right to bodily and mental integrity, autonomy and self-determination, including a freedom from torture and ill-treatment. It calls for no-one to be subjected to invasive or irreversible medical procedures to modify sex characteristics without their consent unless necessary to prevent urgent and serious harm.
- The Right to Freedom from Criminalization and Sanction: Principle 33 recognizes a right to freedom from indirect or direct criminalization or sanction, including in customary, religious, public decency, vagrancy, sodomy and propaganda laws.
- The Right to Protection from Poverty: Principle 34 calls for the right to protection from poverty and social exclusion.
- The Right to Sanitation: Principle 35 calls on a right to safe and equitable access to sanitation and hygiene facilities.
- The Right to the Enjoyment of Human Rights in Relation to Information and Communication Technologies: Principle 36 calls for the same protection of rights online as offline.
- The Right to Truth: Principle 37 calls for the right to know the truth about human rights violations, including investigation and reparation unlimited by statutes of limitations, and including access to medical records.
- The Right to Practice, Protect, Preserve and Revive Cultural Diversity: Principle 38 calls on the right to practise and manifest cultural diversity.
- Additional State Obligations: the YP Plus 10 set out a range of additional obligations for States, including in relation to HIV status, access to sport, combating discrimination in prenatal selection and genetic modification technologies, detention and asylum, education, the right to health, and freedom of peaceful assembly and association.
- Additional Recommendations: the Principles also set out recommendations for national human rights institutions and sporting organizations.

== History ==
The website promoting the Principles notes that concerns have been voiced about a trend of people's human rights being violated because of their sexual orientation or gender identity. While the United Nations human rights instruments detail obligations to ensure that people are protected from discrimination and stereotypes, which includes people's expression of sexual orientation or gender identity, implementation of these rights has been fragmented and inconsistent internationally. The Principles aim to provide a consistent understanding about application of international human rights law in relation to sexual orientation and gender identity.

The Yogyakarta Principles were developed at a meeting of the International Commission of Jurists, the International Service for Human Rights and human rights experts from around the world at Gadjah Mada University on Java from 6 to 9 November 2006. The seminar clarified the nature, scope and implementation of states' human rights obligations under existing human rights treaties and law, in relation to sexual orientation and gender identity. The principles that developed out of this meeting were adopted by human rights experts from around the world, and included judges, academics, a former UN High Commissioner for Human Rights, NGOs and others. The Irish human rights expert Michael O'Flaherty was rapporteur responsible for drafting and development of the Yogyakarta Principles adopted at the meeting. Vitit Muntarbhorn and Sonia Onufer Corrêa were the co-chairpersons.

The concluding document "contains 29 principles adopted unanimously by the experts, along with recommendations to governments, regional intergovernmental institutions, civil society, and the UN itself". The principles are named after Yogyakarta, the city where the conference was held. These principles have not been adopted by States in a treaty, and are thus not by themselves a legally binding part of international human rights law. However the Principles are intended to serve as an interpretive aid to the human rights treaties.

Among the 29 signatories of the principles were Mary Robinson, Manfred Nowak, Martin Scheinin, Mauro Cabral, Sonia Corrêa, Elizabeth Evatt, Philip Alston, Edwin Cameron, Asma Jahangir, Paul Hunt, Sanji Mmasenono Monageng, Sunil Babu Pant, Stephen Whittle and Wan Yanhai. The signatories intended that the Yogyakarta Principles should be adopted as a universal standard, affirming binding international legal standard with which all States must comply but some states have expressed reservations.

In alignment with the movement towards establishing basic human rights for all people, the Yogyakarta Principles specifically address sexual orientation and gender identity. The Principles were developed in response to patterns of abuse reported from around the world. These included examples of sexual assault and rape, torture and ill-treatment, extrajudicial executions, honour killing, invasion of privacy, arbitrary arrest and imprisonment, medical abuse, denial of free speech and assembly and discrimination, prejudice and stigmatization in work, health, education, housing, family law, access to justice and immigration. These are estimated to affect millions of people who are, or have been, targeted on the basis of perceived or actual sexual orientation or gender identity.

=== Launch ===
The finalised Yogyakarta Principles was launched as a global charter on 26 March 2007 at a public event in Geneva, timed to coincide with the main session of the United Nations Human Rights Council. Michael O'Flaherty, spoke at the International Lesbian and Gay Association (ILGA) Conference in Lithuania on 27 October 2007; he explained that "all human rights belong to all of us. We have human rights because we exist – not because we are gay or straight and irrespective of our gender identities", but that in many situations these human rights are not respected or realised, and that "the Yogyakarta Principles is to redress that situation".

The Yogyakarta Principles were presented at a United Nations event in New York City on 7 November 2007, co-sponsored by Argentina, Brazil and Uruguay. Human Rights Watch explain that the first step towards this would be the de-criminalisation of homosexuality in 77 countries that still carry legal penalties for people in same-sex relationships, and repeal of the death penalty in the seven countries that still have the death penalty for such sexual practice.

=== Yogyakarta Principles plus 10 ===
On 10 November 2017, the "Yogyakarta Principles plus 10" (The YP +10) to the supplement the Principles, formally as "Additional Principles and State Obligation on the Application of International Human Rights Law in Relation to Sexual Orientation, Gender Expression and Sex Characteristics to Complement the Yogyakarta Principles", emerged from the intersection of the developments in international human rights law with the emerging understanding of violations suffered by person on ground of sexual orientation and gender identity and the recognition of the district and intersectional grounds of gender expression and sex characteristics.

The update was drafted by a committee of Mauro Cabral Grinspan, Morgan Carpenter, Julia Ehrt, Sheherezade Kara, Arvind Narrain, Pooja Patel, Chris Sidoti and Monica Tabengwa. Signatories additionally include Philip Alston, Edwin Cameron, Kamala Chandrakirana, Sonia Onufer Corrêa, David Kaye, Maina Kiai, Victor Madrigal-Borloz, Sanji Mmasenono Monageng, Vitit Muntarbhorn, Sunil Pant, Dainius Puras, Ajit Prakash Shah, Sylvia Tamale, Frans Viljoen, and Kimberly Zieselman.

== Reasoning ==
The compilers explain that the Principles detail how international human rights law can be applied to sexual orientation and gender identity issues, in a way that affirms international law and to which all states can be bound. They maintain that wherever people are recognised as being born free and equal in dignity and rights, this should include LGBT people. They argue that human rights standards can be interpreted in terms of sexual orientation and gender identity when they touch on issues of torture and violence, extrajudicial execution, access to justice, privacy, freedom from discrimination, freedom of expression and assembly, access to employment, health-care, education, and immigration and refugee issues. The Principles aim to explain that States are obliged to ensure equal access to human rights, and each principle recommends how to achieve this, highlighting international agencies' responsibilities to promote and maintain human rights.

The Principles are based on the recognition of the right to non-discrimination. The Committee on Economic, Social and Cultural Rights (CESCR) has dealt with these matters in its General Comments, the interpretative texts it issues to explicate the full meaning of the provisions of the International Covenant on Economic, Social and Cultural Rights. In General Comments Nos. 18 of 2005 (on the right to work), 15 of 2002 (on the right to water) and 14 of 2000 (on the right to the highest attainable standard of health), it indicated that the Covenant proscribes any discrimination on the basis of, inter alia, sex and sexual orientation "that has the intention or effect of nullifying or impairing the equal enjoyment or exercise of [the right at issue]".

The Committee on the Elimination of Discrimination against Women (CEDAW), notwithstanding that it has not addressed the matter in a General Comment or otherwise specified the applicable provisions of the Convention on the Elimination of All Forms of Discrimination Against Women, on a number of occasions has criticised states for discrimination on the basis of sexual orientation. For example, it addressed the situation of sexual minority women in Kyrgyzstan and recommended that, 'lesbianism be reconceptualised as a sexual orientation and that penalties for its practice be abolished'.

== Reception ==
=== United Nations ===
The Principles have never been accepted by the United Nations and the attempt to make gender identity and sexual orientation new categories of non-discrimination has been repeatedly rejected by the General Assembly, the UN Human Rights Council and other UN bodies. In July 2010, Vernor Muñoz, United Nations Special Rapporteur on the Right to Education, presented to the United Nations General Assembly an interim report on the human right to comprehensive sexual education, in which he cited the Yogyakarta Principles as a Human Rights standard. In the ensuing discussion, the majority of General Assembly Third Committee members recommended against adopting the principles. The Representative of Malawi, speaking on behalf of all African States argued that the report:

Reflected an attempt to introduce controversial notions and a disregard to the Code of Conduct for Special Procedures Mandate-holders as outlined in Human Rights Council resolution 8/4. She expressed alarm at the reinterpretation of existing human rights instruments, principles and concepts. The report also selectively quoted general comments and country-specific recommendations made by treaty bodies and propagated controversial and unrecognized principles, including the so-called Yogyakarta Principles, to justify his personal opinion.

Trinidad and Tobago, on behalf of the Caribbean States members of CARICOM, argued that the special rapporteur "had chosen to ignore his mandate, as laid down in Human Rights Council resolution 8/4, and to focus instead on the so-called 'human right to comprehensive education.' Such a right did not exist under any internationally agreed human rights instrument or law and his attempts to create one far exceeded his mandate and that of the Human Rights Council." The representative of Mauritania, speaking on behalf of the Arab League, said that the Arab States were "dismayed" and accused the rapporteur of attempting to promote "controversial doctrines that did not enjoy universal recognition" and to "redefine established concepts of sexual and reproductive health education, or of human rights more broadly". The Russian Federation expressed "its disappointment and fundamental disagreement with the report," writing of the rapporteur:

As justification for his conclusions, he cited numerous documents which had not been agreed to at the intergovernmental level, and which therefore could not be considered as authoritative expressions of the opinion of the international community. In particular, he referred to the Yogyarkarta Principles and also to the International Technical Guidance on Sexuality Education. Implementation of various provisions and recommendations of the latter document would result in criminal prosecution for such criminal offences as corrupting youth.

=== Regional institutions ===
The Council of Europe states in "Human Rights and Gender Identity" that Principle 3 of the Yogyakarta Principles is "of particular relevance". They recommend that member states "abolish sterilisation and other compulsory medical treatment as a necessary legal requirement to recognise a person's gender identity in laws regulating the process for name and sex change," (V.4) as well as to "make gender reassignment procedures, such as hormone treatment, surgery and psychological support, accessible for transgender persons, and ensure that they are reimbursed by public health insurance schemes." (V.5) Similarly, the Parliamentary Assembly of the Council of Europe adopted a document titled "Discrimination on the basis of sexual orientation and gender identity" on 23 March 2010, describing the prejudice that "homosexuality is immoral" as a "subjective view usually based on religious dogma that, in a democratic society, cannot be a basis for limiting the rights of others." The document argued that the belief that "homosexuality is worsening the demographic crisis and threatening the future of the nation" is "illogical," and that "granting legal recognition to same-sex couples has no influence on whether heterosexuals marry or have children."

=== National institutions ===
The Principles have been cited by numerous national governments and court judgments. The principles influenced the proposed UN declaration on sexual orientation and gender identity in 2008. Human rights and LGBT-rights groups took up the principles, and discussion has featured in the gay press, as well as academic papers and text books (see bibliography).

==== Brazil ====
In a unanimous decision on May 5, 2011, the Brazilian Supreme Federal Court became the first supreme court in the world to recognize same-sex civil unions as a family entity equal in rights to a heterosexual one, as certified by UNESCO, expressly citing the Yogyakarta Principles as a significant legal guideline:

It is important to point out, for relevant, that this examination is in line with the Yogyakarta Principles, that translates recommendations addressed to the national States, as a result of a conference held in Indonesia, in November 2006, under the coordination of the International Commission of Jurists and the International Service for Human Rights. This Charter of Principles on the application of international human rights regarding sexual and gender identity has, in its text, the Principle 24, the wording of which is as follows: THE RIGHT TO CONSTITUTE FAMILY ... .

==== India ====
The Supreme Court of India relied on the Yogyakarta Principles (2007), when ruling in the case of NLSA v. Union of India (2014), which recognised the right to self-identify gender and recognized non-binary gender as "Third Gender". The court held that Yogyakarta Principles must be recognised and followed as long as they are consistent with the fundamental rights enshrined in the Constitution of India.

53. ...Any international convention not inconsistent with the fundamental rights and in harmony with its spirit must be read into those provisions, e.g., Articles 14, 15, 19 and 21 of the Constitution to enlarge the meaning and content thereof and to promote the object of constitutional guarantee. Principles discussed hereinbefore on [Transgender Person]s and the International Conventions, including Yogyakarta principles, which we have found not inconsistent with the various fundamental rights guaranteed under the Indian Constitution, must be recognized and followed, which has sufficient legal and historical justification in our country.

The Constitutional Bench of the Supreme Court of India held that the Yogyakarta Principles (2007) conform to the constitutional view of fundamental rights, when decriminalizing homosexuality in the case of Navtej Singh Johar v. Union of India (2018). In his concurring opinion, Justice R.F. Nariman said,

84. ...the Yogyakarta Principles on the Application of International Human Rights Law in relation to Sexual Orientation and Gender Identity discussed below, which were also referred to by Radhakrishnan, J. in NALSA (supra), conform to our constitutional view of the fundamental rights of the citizens of India and persons who come to this Court.
85. The International Commission of Jurists and the International Service for Human Rights, on behalf of a coalition of human rights organisations, had undertaken a project to develop a set of international legal principles on the application of international law to human rights violations based on sexual orientation and gender identity to bring greater clarity and coherence to States' human rights obligations...
88. These principles give further content to the fundamental rights contained in Articles 14, 15, 19 and 21, and viewed in the light of these principles also, Section 377 will have to be declared to be unconstitutional.

Essentially, the Supreme Court read the Yogyakarta Principles (2007) into the Fundamental Rights of the Indian Constitution.

== Intersex people ==
The Yogyakarta Principles mention intersex people only briefly. In a manual on Promoting and Protecting Human Rights in relation to Sexual Orientation, Gender Identity and Sex Characteristics, the Asia Pacific Forum of National Human Rights Institutions (APF) states, "The Principles do not deal appropriately or adequately with the application of international human rights law in relation to intersex people. They do not specifically distinguish sex characteristics." Those issues were addressed in the Yogyakarta Principles plus 10 update. Boris Dittrich of Human Rights Watch comments that the new update "protects intersex children from involuntary modification of their sex characteristics".

== See also ==
- Declaration of Montreal

== Bibliography ==
- The Yogyakarta Principles
- Yogyakarta Principles plus 10
- The Yogyakarta Principles (Official site of UNHCR)
- Yogyakarta Principles in Action
- Andrzejewski, Ju; Baltodano, Marta; Symcox, Linda (2009). Social Justice, Peace, and Environmental Education: Transformative Standards. Routledge. ISBN 9780203879429.
- Dittrich, Boris, Yogyakarta Principles: applying existing human rights norms to sexual orientation and gender identity, HIV AIDS Policy Law Rev. 2008 Dec;13(2–3):92-3.
- Ettelbrick, Paula L.; Trabucco Zerán, Alia (2016), The impact of the Yogyakarta Principles on the International Human Rights Law Development, A Study of November 2007 – June 2010 (PDF)
- S. Farrior, Human Rights Advocacy on Gender Issues: Challenges and Opportunities, J Human Rights Practice, March 1, 2009; 1(1): 83–100.
- Kara, Sheherezade (2016). "Reclaiming the Gender Framework: Contextualizing Jurisprudence on Gender Identity in UN Human Rights Mechanisms". LGBTQ Policy Journal. VI: 22–32.
- Michael O'Flaherty and John Fisher, Sexual Orientation, Gender Identity and International Human Rights Law: Contextualising the Yogyakarta Principles, Human Rights Law Review 2008 8(2):207–248; doi:10.1093/hrlr/ngn009
- Otto, Dianne (October 2015). "Queering Gender (Identity) in International Law". Nordic Journal of Human Rights. 33 (4): 299–318. doi:10.1080/18918131.2016.1123474. ISSN 1891-8131. S2CID 147374368.
- Tozzi, Piero A. (2008), Six Problems with the "Yogyakarta Principles" (PDF), Catholic Family & Human Rights Institute
- Waites, Matthew (2009). "Critique of 'sexual orientation' and 'gender identity' in human rights discourse: global queer politics beyond the Yogyakarta Principles". Contemporary Politics. 15 (1): 137–156. doi:10.1080/13569770802709604. ISSN 1356-9775. S2CID 143695135.
