= Women in the Democratic Republic of the Congo =

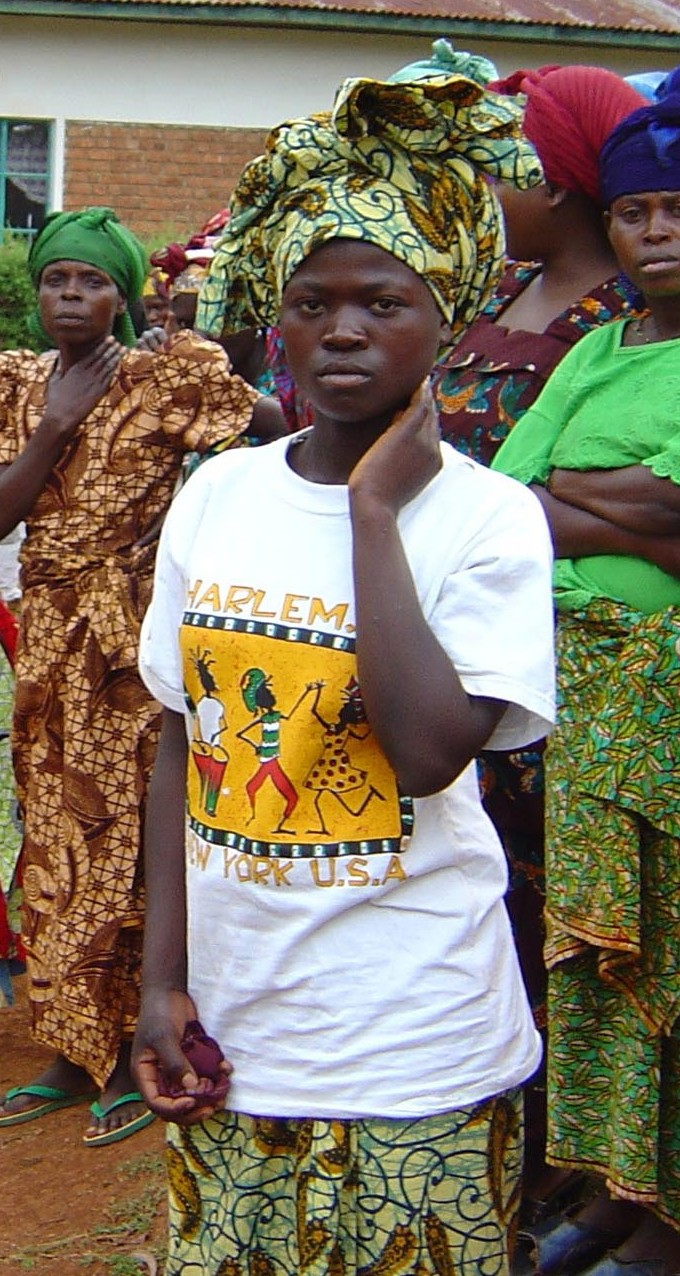
- Congolese woman near Walungu, South Kivu

General statistics
- Maternal mortality (per 100,000): 540 (2010)
- Women in parliament: 8.2% (2012)
- Women over 25 with secondary education: 10.7% (2010)
- Women in labour force: 70.2% (2011)

Gender Inequality Index
- Value: 0.601 (2021)
- Rank: 151st out of 191

Global Gender Gap Index
- Value: 0.575 (2022)
- Rank: 144th out of 146

Women in the Democratic Republic of the Congo have not attained a position of full equality with men, with their struggle continuing to this day. Although the Mobutu regime paid lip service to the important role of women in society, and although women enjoy some legal rights (e.g., the right to own property and the right to participate in the economic and political sectors), custom and legal constraints still limit their opportunities.

The inferiority of women has always been embedded in the indigenous social system and reemphasized in the colonial era. The colonial-era status of African women in urban areas was low. Adult women were legitimate urban dwellers if they were wives, widows, or elderly. Otherwise they were presumed to be femmes libres (free women) and were taxed as income-earning prostitutes, whether they were or not. From 1939 to 1943, over 30% of adult Congolese women in Stanleyville (now Kisangani) were so registered. The taxes they paid constituted the second largest source of tax revenue for Stanleyville.

== Social issues ==
=== Sexual violence ===
The war situation has made the life of women more precarious. Violence against women seems to be perceived by large sectors of society to be normal. In July 2007, the International Committee of the Red Cross expressed concern about the situation in eastern DRC.

A phenomenon of 'pendulum displacement' has developed, where people hasten at night to safety. According to Yakin Ertürk, the UN Special Rapporteur on Violence against Women who toured eastern Congo in July 2007, violence against women in North and South Kivu included "unimaginable brutality". "Armed groups attack local communities, loot, rape, kidnap women and children and make them work as sexual slaves," Ertürk said. A local initiative by women in Bukavu aims for recovery from violence based on women's own empowerment.

In December 2008 GuardianFilms posted a film on the Guardian newspaper website profiling a project to record the testimony of over 400 women and girls who had been abused by marauding militia.

=== Female genital mutilation ===
Besides war rape in Congo's civil wars, there are other serious threats to women's physical well-being in the Democratic Republic of the Congo. Female genital mutilation (FGM), while not widespread, exists among some populations in northern parts of the DRC. The prevalence of FGM is estimated at 5% of women in the DRC. FGM is now illegal: the law imposes a penalty of two to five years of prison and a fine of 200,000 Congolese francs on any person who violates the "physical or functional integrity" of the genital organs.

=== Women's health ===
Maternal mortality rates are high, as access to maternal healthcare is limited. Additionally, a woman can only use contraceptives with the permission of her husband, rendering her unable to prevent herself from contracting AIDS from him.

Women are disproportionately impacted by HIV in the DRC: of the 390,000 adults infected with HIV 71.79% are women. The rate of new HIV infections among women ages 15–24 was four-times higher than that of men in the same demographic. Women are also less likely to have access to treatment than men. 73% of adult men living with HIV are on treatment, compared to 58% of adult women.

Under the penal code of the Democratic Republic of Congo (DRC) abortion is prohibited, but it is generally accepted that an abortion can be performed to save a woman's life. However, access to safe abortion in the DRC is extremely limited and women are rarely able to access reliable medical procedures. The DRC is a signatory to the Maputo Protocol which directs states to legalize abortion in cases where a woman's physical and mental health is at jeopardy or in cases of rape, incest, and fetal anomaly. The Congolese government ratified the Maputo Protocol in March 2008, and due to the nature of the country's legal system, this expanded the categories of legal abortion in compliance with the Maputo Protocol. Nonetheless, Congolese women's health advocate Anny Modi identified in 2020 that few doctors in the DRC are capable of conducting the procedure, creating an "obstacle race" for women seeking to terminate a pregnancy.

=== Child marriage ===
Child marriage in the Democratic Republic of the Congo is the eighteenth highest in the world. In a child marriage, one or both parties are under the age of eighteen years old. In the Democratic Republic of the Congo (DRC), 37% of girls are married before they turn eighteen, and 10% of girls are married before age fifteen. Though significantly less than the rate of child marriage for girls, 6% of boys in the DRC are married before age eighteen.

Even though child marriage is prevalent in the DRC, it is illegal. The legal age of marriage is eighteen. There are multiple international laws and agreements that ban the practice. However, the DRC is one of seven countries in the African Union to have signed but not ratified the African Charter on the Rights and Welfare of the Child (ACRWC), which explicitly prohibits child marriage.

Parents sometimes force their daughters into child marriage to gain financial or social status benefits. Other causes include tradition and conflict in the region which leads to higher rates of child marriage. However, child marriages have consequences, as married girls experience worse health outcomes, lower levels of education, higher rates of violence, and psychological impacts.

Many organizations and programs have been initiated to combat child marriage, especially on the international scale from the United Nations. Advocates against the ubiquity of child marriage have fought for outreach or intervention programs.

=== Human trafficking ===
The DRC is a source and destination country for men, women, and children subjected to trafficking in persons, specifically conditions of forced labor and forced prostitution. The majority of this trafficking is internal, and much of it is perpetrated by armed groups and government forces outside government control within the DRC's unstable eastern provinces.

=== Prostitution ===
Food insecurity and extreme poverty are now the main reasons why women in the DRC become prostitutes. Traders make up the majority of clients, along with officials working for national and international NGOs. Many sex workers earn between $2 and $5 and payment is sometimes made in the form of food or other goods. Prostitutes working in bars and nightclubs receive between $10 and $20, and are known as "Londoners" as they dress like British girls on a Saturday night out. "VIP prostitution" operates from hotels, with sex workers earning between $50 and $100. Many Congolese prostitutes are from abroad or homeless children who have been accused of witchcraft.

== Economy and society ==
"There were food taboos which restrict women from eating certain foods (usually the most desirable) since 'they are not the equals of men.' Women may not eat in the presence of other men, and they are often allowed only their husband's leftovers."

=== Urban women ===
Opportunities for wage labor jobs and professional positions remained rare even after independence. For example, in Kisangani there were no women in law, medicine, or government in 1979, nineteen years after independence. Moreover, educational opportunities for girls remained constricted compared with those for boys.

By the 1990s, women had made strides in the professional world, and a growing number of women now work in the professions, government service, the military, and the universities. But they remain underrepresented in the formal work force, especially in higher-level jobs, and generally earn less than their male counterparts in the same jobs.

In addition, certain laws clearly state that women are legally subservient to men. A married woman must have her husband's permission to open a bank account, accept a job, obtain a commercial license, or rent or sell real estate. Article 45 of the civil code specifies that the husband has rights to his wife's goods, even if their marriage contract states that each spouse separately owns his or her own goods. Women have to get the approval of their husband before getting any sort of job offer.

Adapting to this situation, urban women have exploited commercial opportunities in the informal economy, outside of men's control. They generally conduct business without bank accounts, without accounting records, and without reporting all of their commerce. Anthropologist Janet MacGaffey's study of enterprises in Kisangani showed that 28 percent of the city's large business owners not dependent on political connections were women; these women specialized in long-distance distribution and retail and semi-wholesale trade. About 21 percent of the retail stores in the commercial and administrative zone of the city were women's, and women dominated the market trade.

=== Rural women ===
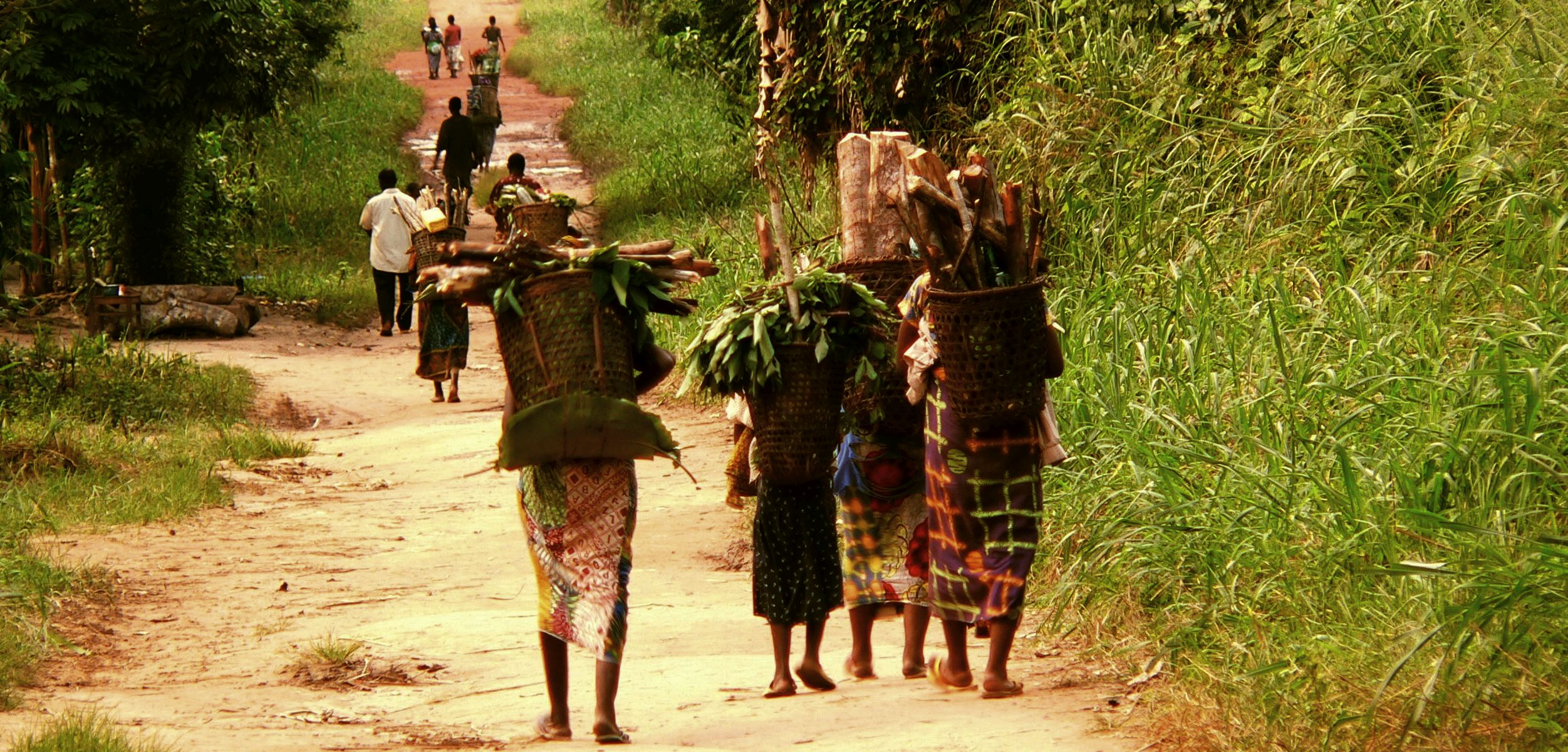
Women returning from their vegetable gardens with cassava and firewood.

Rural women find fewer such strategies available. Saddled with the bulk of agricultural work, firewood gathering, water hauling, and child care, they have generally seen an increase in their labor burdens as the economy has deteriorated. In the DRC's eastern highlands, conditions have grown particularly severe. The state promoted expansion of cash crop hectarage for export, particularly of coffee and quinine, has reduced the amount and quality of land available for peasant household food-crop production.

Plantations owned by the politico-commercial and new commercial elites have increasingly expanded onto communal lands, displacing existing food crops with cash crops. Within peasant households, men's control of the allocation of household land for export and food crops has led to greater use of land for export crops, and the diminution of women's access to land and food crops.

Even when male producers turn to cultivating food crops, the household does not necessarily profit nutritionally. Food needed for household consumption is frequently sold for cash, cash needed to pay for daily necessities, clothes, school fees, taxes, and so on. Higher-priced and nutritionally superior food crops such as sorghum are frequently sold by producers who eat only their cheaper, less nutritious food crops such as cassava. Widespread malnutrition among children has resulted.

Among groups where women have more power, the situation is less severe. Among the Lemba, for example, women not only have more say in determining what is grown but also in what is consumed. In a country where the most widespread pattern is for the men to be served the best food first, with the remainder going to women and children, Lemba women traditionally set aside choice food items and sauces for their own and their children's consumption before feeding the men their food. Their nutritional status and that of their children is correspondingly better.

Rural women have arguably borne the brunt of state exactions. In some cases, women have banded together to resist the rising tolls and taxes imposed on them. Political scientist Katharine Newbury studied a group of Tembo women growers of cassava and peanuts west of Lac Kivu who successfully protested against the imposition of excessive collectivity taxes and market taxes levied on them when they went to market. The local chief was hostile. But a sympathetic local Catholic church, which provided a forum for meetings and assistance in letter writing, was helpful, as was the ethnic homogeneity of the group. Although they could not nominate a woman for election to the local council, they did succeed in voting for males friendly to their position. The newly elected councillors hastened to suspend the taxes and the tolls.

== Women's organizations ==
Not all women's organizations have been equally successful. In Kisangani the Association of Women Merchants (Association des Femmes Commerçantes—Afco) failed to advance the interests of the assembled women merchants. The group instead turned into a vehicle for class interests, namely those of the middle-class president. MacGaffey clearly saw the case as one of the triumph of class solidarity over gender solidarity.

A continuing challenge for women has been the limited integration of women's experience and perspectives into the development initiatives of Western development agencies. As Brooke Schoepf has documented, little effort has been made to create agricultural extension networks for women, who have continued to contribute the overwhelming bulk of agricultural labor. In addition, project production goals rarely have taken into account the effect of the withdrawal of women's time from current food production and household work to meet the goals of the new programs. Development in such a context often has meant a step backward rather than a step forward from the perspective of the women being "developed".

The United Nations Committee on the Elimination of Discrimination against Women in 2006 expressed concern that in the post-war transition period, the promotion of women's human rights and gender equality is not seen as a priority.

A 2006 report by the African Association for the Defence of Human Rights prepared for that committee provides a broad overview of issues confronting women in the DRC in law and in daily life.

In 2015, diaspora figures such as Emmanuel Weyi began to comment on the plight affecting women, and the need to make their progress a key issue in the approaching democratic election (which didn't take place).

== Women in the ICD process ==
The ICD or the inter-Congolese dialogue was designed to create a new political process that works toward peace in the DRC. As the DRC is a very hostile place that has many rebel groups as well as an unstable economy leading to constant civil wars and hostility. As the ICD was established in 1999, they work on making the DRC a more neutral place such as, all participants in the movement to have equal status. After six months of cooperation and careful consideration, the ICD appointed Sir Ketumile Masire as the facilitator. The ICD was made up of mostly men where they created rules for the requirements to become a delegate at which left women at a disadvantage or impossible to join.

Out of the 73 delegates, only six were women and were told that they were not allowed to bring up gender related issues. Some women that would go against what they were told would bring up issues of protecting women's rights while a different women shamed her for bring up topics unrelated to the ICD process. Many women that were chosen to be delegates were wives, girlfriends, and or significant others that would fall in line to whatever their husband or so forth would tell them to do. Women became tired of watching the men in their country make the rules for women without a say. The UN Security Council Resolution 1325 and the SADC or (Southern African Development Community), fight to end all forms of discrimination against women. They called for women to hold 30 percent of the delegate positions to ensure that their voices and needs are being heard.

Sir Ketumile Masire held meetings with the UNIFEM or (The United Nations Development Fund for Women) to promote women to be a part of the dialogue process. UNIFEM educated the women that were to become delegates, so they are informed on their gender dimensions. While having women as delegates is great, the women need to promote and bring together other women to fight for their issues. Women provide knowledge about the territories where they live as well as what the needs of their people are.

== Women's voice in the community dialogue ==
The ongoing cycle of violence in Congo killed more people than any other conflict since World War II and caused many to flee their homes and reside in displacement camps. Some women activists who are also affected by the war in the country stepped into a high-risk role of appealing to a group of military men in an army post. The women requested protection for those who live in and around camps while on their daily duties. The activist action is considered an inspiring approach to help improve relationships between soldiers and civilians- to reduce vulnerability and tensions in the camp areas. The women's attempt includes assessing security situations and negotiation with some rebels through individual and group discussions especially at the time of escalations and when tensions rise between warring groups. These women were considered brave for presenting their security cases to the very same military groups that are accused by the UN as alleged perpetrators.

== See also ==
- Women in Africa
