= Genocidal rape =

Mass sexual assault during wartime as part of a genocidal campaign

Genocidal rape is the action of a group which has carried out acts of mass rape and gang rapes, against its enemy during wartime as part of a genocidal campaign. It is a form of wartime sexual violence. During the Armenian genocide, the Greek genocide, the Assyrian genocide, the second Sino-Japanese war, the Holocaust, the Genocide of Serbs in Croatia, the Bangladesh genocide, the Yugoslav Wars (particularly the Bosnian and Kosovo Wars), the Rwandan genocide, the Tamil genocide, the Circassian genocide, the Congolese conflicts, the War in Darfur, the South Sudanese Civil War, the Yazidi Genocide, the Firman of Mir Muhammad and Rohingya genocide, mass rapes that had been an integral part of those conflicts brought the concept of genocidal rape to international prominence. Although war rape has been a recurrent feature in conflicts throughout human history, it has usually been looked upon as a by-product of conflict and not an integral part of military policy.

== Genocide debate ==
Some scholars argue that the Convention on the Prevention and Punishment of the Crime of Genocide should state that mass rape is a genocidal crime. Other scholars argue that genocidal rape is already included in the definition under Article II (Note: ...any of the following acts committed with intent to destroy, in whole or in part, a national, ethnical, racial or religious group, as such: (a) Killing members of the group; (b) Causing serious bodily or mental harm to members of the group; (c) Deliberately inflicting on the group conditions of life calculated to bring about its physical destruction in whole or in part; (d) Imposing measures intended to prevent births within the group; (e) Forcibly transferring children of the group to another group. — Convention on the Prevention and Punishment of the Crime of Genocide, Art. II.) of the convention. Catharine MacKinnon argues that the victims of genocidal rape are used as a substitute for the entire ethnic group, that rape is used as a tool, with the target being the destruction of the entire ethnic group.

Siobhan Fisher has argued that forced impregnation and not the rape itself constitutes genocide. She says, "Repeated rape alone is still 'just' rape, but rape with the intent to impregnate is something more." Lisa Sharlach argues that this definition is too narrow because these mass rapes should not be defined as genocide based solely on those raped having been forcibly impregnated.

== Rape as genocide ==
Per the United Nations Security Council Resolution 1820 (declared on 2008) rape and other forms of sexual violence can constitute war crimes, crimes against humanity or a constitutive act with respect to genocide.

According to Amnesty International, the use of rape during times of war is not a by-product of conflicts but rather a pre-planned and deliberate military strategy. In the last quarter of a century, the majority of conflicts have shifted from wars between nation states to communal and intrastate civil wars. During these conflicts the use of rape as a weapon against the civilian population by state and non-state actors has become more frequent. Journalists and human rights organizations have documented campaigns of genocidal rape during conflicts in former Yugoslavia, Sierra Leone, Rwanda, Liberia, Sudan, Uganda, and during the civil war in the Democratic Republic of the Congo.

The strategic aims of these mass rapes are twofold. The first is to instill terror in the civilian population, with the intent to forcibly dislocate them from their land. (Note: "In the context of genocide [...] violence against women may be aimed at the destruction of the integrity of the group through its women, who embody its genetic and cultural continuity.") The second is to degrade the chance of possible return and reconstitution by having inflicted humiliation and shame on the targeted population and to decrease social cohesion of a targeted group. Targeted rape has also been used to force those who might resist genocide into submission. These effects are strategically important for non-state actors, as it is necessary for them to remove the targeted population from the land. Rape as genocide is often used for campaigns which involve ethnic cleansing and genocide, as the objective is to destroy, or forcefully remove the target population, and ensure they do not return.

One objective of genocidal rape is forced pregnancy, so that the aggressing actor not only invades the targeted population's land, but their bloodlines and families as well. However, those unable to bear children are also subject to sexual assault. Victims' ages can range from children to women in their eighties.

== Documented instances ==
Armin Wegner's description: "the Armenian women and girls are generally very beautiful. Looking at you is the dark [and] beautiful face of Babesheea who was robbed by Kurds, raped, and freed only after ten days; like a wild beast the Turkish soldiers, officers, and gendarmes swept down on this welcome prey. All the crimes that had ever been committed against women, were committed here. They cut off their breasts, mutilated their limbs, and their corpses lay naked, defiled, or blackened by the heat on the fields."

Rape was widespread during the Armenian Genocide, which was committed by the Ottoman Turks. During the death marches of Armenian civilians through Anatolia in 1915, Turkish soldiers frequently raped and killed Armenian women and children. In many cases, Turkish and Kurdish civilians also participated in these crimes. Turks took Armenian women and girls into sexual slavery or forced them into marriage. Those women forced into marriage also had to convert to Islam. Some perpetrators believed that women and girls could be successfully assimilated into Muslim Turkish culture, unlike men and boys. After the genocide ended, women and girls who had been forced into marriage often could not return to their former lives. They had no family left, no source of income, or otherwise feared the stigma of having married a Turk. Additionally, Turks publicly raped the wives, daughters, and other female relatives of important Armenian men. In addition to dehumanizing the victims, these targeted rapes intimidated the Armenian leadership into submission and dissuaded them from resisting. Some Armenian women and girls were sold as sex slaves. The Turkish soldiers stripped them naked and displayed them at auction. Their nudity in a conservative society served to further dehumanize them and strip them of agency. Many were forced into marriage or prostitution.

During the Greek genocide, another of the late Ottoman genocides, Turkish troops and civilians abducted Greek village women and raped them for hours or days. Turkish villagers raped one woman for eight days in a row; she died soon after. One man, who protested the violation of his wife, was sodomized. In the Pontos region, bands of brigands led by Topal Osman went from village to village, plundering, raping women, and killing at will. As in the Armenian genocide, it was common for Turkish troops to kill the men and rape the women; the women often died later during the long marches to Syria. Massacres were especially prevalent along the Black Sea coast while the Russians invaded and the Turkish troops fell back. In one Pontic village, dozens of women and girls leapt into a river to avoid rape. Turkish troops rounded up women at Vazelon Monastery, a Greek Orthodox monastery, and raped them before killing them. Many women and girls were also raped during the death marches to Syria.

During Sayfo, or the Assyrian genocide, Turkish soldiers followed the same pattern: they massacred the young men and deported the women, children, and elderly. Many women were raped during deportation or sold to Muslim civilians as sex slaves. Women were abducted and forced to convert to Islam. In Urmia, which had a large Assyrian population before the genocide, both Turkish and Kurdish civilians raped or abducted Assyrian girls. In one village, perpetrators subjected girls as young as eight to rape; in another, girls as young as six or seven who had been hiding on a rooftop were raped. Many rape victims later died. Turkish irregulars raped some women as they were dying.

In the Democratic Republic of the Congo (DRC), it is estimated that in 2011 alone there were 400,000 rapes. In the DRC, genocidal rape is focused on the destruction of family and communities. An interview with a survivor gave an account of gang rape, forced cannibalism of a fetus taken from an eviscerated woman, and child murder.

During the Bangladesh Liberation War in 1971, members of the Pakistani military and supporting Bihari and Razakar militias raped between 200,000 and 400,000 Bangladeshi women in a systematic campaign of genocidal rape. Some women may have been raped as many as eighty times in a night.

In the ongoing Darfur genocide, the Janjaweed militias have carried out actions described as genocidal rape, with not just women, but children also being raped, as well as babies being bludgeoned to death and the sexual mutilation of victims being commonplace.

During the Second Sino-Japanese War, the Imperial Japanese Army during the Battle of Nanjing carried out what has come to be known as the Rape of Nanjing, which has been described by political scientist, Adam Jones, as "one of the most savage instances of genocidal rape". The violence saw tens of thousands of women gang raped and killed. The International Military Tribunal for the Far East estimated that 20,000 women were raped, including infants and the elderly.

A large portion of these rapes were systematized in a process where soldiers would search door-to-door for young girls, with many women taken captive and gang raped. The women were often killed immediately after being raped, often through explicit mutilation or by stabbing a bayonet, long stick of bamboo, or other objects into the vagina. Young children were not exempt from these atrocities, and were cut open to allow Japanese soldiers to rape them.

On 19 December 1937, the Reverend James M. McCallum wrote in his diary:

I know not where to end. Never I have heard or read such brutality. Rape! Rape! Rape! We estimate at least 1,000 cases a night, and many by day. In case of resistance or anything that seems like disapproval, there is a bayonet stab or a bullet ... People are hysterical ... Women are being carried off every morning, afternoon and evening. The whole Japanese army seems to be free to go and come as it pleases, and to do whatever it pleases.

During the Rwandan genocide, the violence took a gender specific form, with women and girls being targeted in a systematic campaign of sexual assault. It is estimated that between 250,000 and 500,000 were victims of rape. Those who survived the genocidal rape found themselves stigmatised, and many also discovered that they were infected with HIV. This has resulted in these women being denied their rights to property and inheritance as well as their employment chances being restricted. The first woman charged and convicted for genocidal rape was Pauline Nyiramasuhuko.

In 1996, Beverly Allen wrote Rape Warfare: The Hidden Genocide in Bosnia-Herzegovina and Croatia in which the term genocidal rape was first introduced, she used the term to describe the actions of the Serbian armed forces who had a policy of rape with the intention of genocide. In her book she compares genocidal rape to biological warfare. During the conflict in Bosnia Allen gave a definition of genocidal rape as "a military policy of rape for the purpose of genocide currently practiced in Bosnia-Herzegovina and Croatia by the Yugoslav army the Bosnian Serb forces and the irregular Serb forces known as Chetniks".

Coverage of the mass rapes during the ethnic cleansing carried out by the Serbian forces in the 1990s began the analysis over the use of rape as a part of genocide. Catharine MacKinnon argues that the mass rapes during the conflict "were a simultaneous expression of misogyny and genocide", and argues that rape can be used as a form of extermination. (Note: "It is also rape unto death, rape as massacre, rape to kill and to make the victims wish they were dead. It is rape as an instrument of forced exile, rape to make you leave your home and never want to go back. It is rape to be seen and heard and watched and told to others: rape as spectacle. It is rape to drive a wedge through a community, to shatter a society, to destroy a people. It is rape as genocide")

The acts of violence which were committed against women during the Partition of India have also been cited as examples of genocidal rape. Dyan Mazurana et al argued that the "patterns of rape and sexual violence carried out [in the Tigray War] by the ENDF, the EDF and Amhara regional militia and special forces against Tigrayan civilians are consistent with acts of genocide, potentially conducted with the intent of destroying the Tigrayan people."

== See also ==
- Outline of genocide studies
