= Sonia Corrêa =

Brazilian feminist activist and researcher

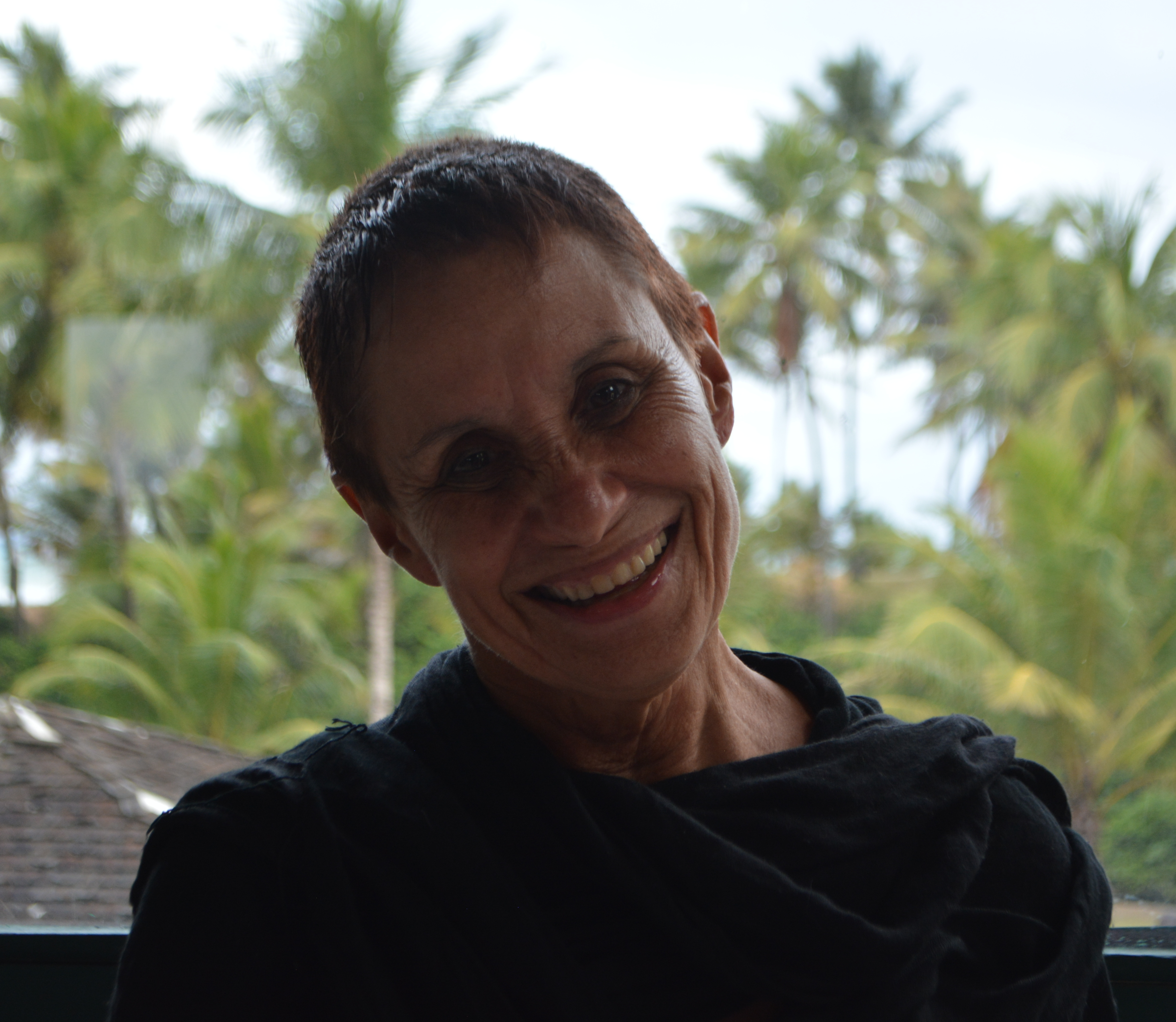
- Sonia Corrêa in 2016
- Born: 18 November 1948 (age 77)

Sonia Corrêa (born 18 November 1948) is a feminist activist and researcher from Brazil, working primarily on issues of gender equality, health and sexuality. Since 2002, she has co-chaired Sexuality Policy Watch (SPW), a global policy forum analysing global trends in sexuality related policies and projects.

From 1992 to 2009, Corrêa was the research coordinator for sexual and reproductive health and rights at Development Alternatives with Women for a New Era (DAWN), a global South feminist network. In this capacity, as a civil society member, she was involved in the United Nations negotiations on gender and sexuality related issues at the 1994 International Conference on Population and Development (ICPD), the 1995 World Conference on Women, International Conference that has adopted the Yogyakarta Principles as one of 29 signatories and their respective reviews.

== Sexuality Policy Watch ==
With Richard Parker, Corrêa co-chairs Sexuality Policy Watch, a global forum of researchers and activists working on sexual rights issues and policies across the world. The forum was launched in 2002 as the International Working Group on Sexuality and Social Policy (IWGSSP), but changed its name to Sexuality Policy Watch in 2006. Since its inception, SPW has conducted research on trends in sexuality, advocated to prevent violence against women, built partnerships with sexual rights groups, and published key policy analyses.

== Selected publications ==
Corrêa has published extensively in Portuguese and English. Her publications include:

- Population and Reproductive Rights: Feminist Perspectives from the South (Zed Books, 1994) ISBN 9781856492836, OCLC 247012868
- Sexuality, Health and Human Rights, co-authored with Richard Parker and Rosalind Petchesky (Routledge, 2008) ISBN 9780415351171, OCLC 449934565
- Development with a Body, co-authored with Andrea Cornwall and Susan Jolly (Zed Books, 2008) ISBN 9781848136465, OCLC 990190773
- "Emerging powers, sexuality and human rights: Fumbling around the elephant", co-authored with Sonia Corrêa and Akashay Khanna (SPW Working Papers, June 2015)
- <<Ideología de género>>. Una genealogía de la hidra, en La reacción patriarcal: neoliberalismo autoritario, politización religiosa y nuevas derechas, coordinado por Martha Cabezas Fernández y Chistina Vega Solís (Bellaterra, 2022) ISBN 9788418684449
