= Rape during the Sierra Leone Civil War =

Sexual violence perpetrated during Sierra Leonean civil war

During the Sierra Leone Civil War gender specific violence was widespread. Rape, sexual slavery and forced marriages were commonplace during the conflict. It has been estimated by Physicians for Human Rights (PHR) that up to 257,000 women were victims of gender related violence during the war. The majority of assaults were carried out by the Revolutionary United Front (RUF). The Armed Forces Revolutionary Council (AFRC), The Civil Defence Forces (CDF), and the Sierra Leone Army (SLA) have also been implicated in sexual violence.

Multiple perpetrator rape (MPR) was widespread during the conflict, with one report showing that seventy-six percent of survivors had been subjected to MPR. There were high levels of survivors having caught a sexually transmitted disease, and six percent reported that they had been forcibly impregnated. Human Rights Watch (HRW) said of the gender related violence that it had been "widespread and systematic".

War crimes trials began in 2006, with thirteen people indicted for gender related violence, and for the first time, forced marriage was found by the trial chamber to be a crime against humanity.

== Rape as genocide ==
According to Amnesty International, the use of rape during times of war is not a by-product of conflicts but a planned and deliberate military strategy. Since the end of the 20th century, the majority of conflicts have shifted from wars between nation states to communal and intrastate civil wars. During these conflicts the use of rape as a weapon against the civilian population by state and non-state actors has become more frequent. Journalists and human rights organisations have documented campaigns of genocidal rape during the conflicts in Bosnia, Sierra Leone, Rwanda, Liberia, Sudan, Uganda, and in the Democratic Republic of Congo (DRC).

The strategic aim of these mass rapes are twofold, the first is to instil terror in the civilian population, with the intent to forcibly dislocate them from their property. The second, to degrade the chance of possible return and reconstitution by having inflicted humiliation and shame on the targeted population. These effects are strategically important for non-state actors, as it is necessary for them to remove the targeted population from the land. Rape as genocide is well suited for campaigns which involve ethnic cleansing and genocide, as the objective is to destroy, or forcefully remove the target population, and ensure they do not return. Cultural anthropologists, historians and social theorists have indicated that the use of mass rape in wartime has become an integral part of modern-day conflicts, such as in the DRC, Darfur, Liberia, and Colombia.

The devastating effects of mass rape do not only affect the person assaulted, but also have a profound impact on familial and community bonds. The destruction wrought by sexual violence weakens the targeted population's survival strategies. The stigma which is associated with rape often results in victims being abandoned, which can lead to the victims being unable to take part in community life, and makes it more difficult to bear and raise children. The use of mass rape allows an enemy to force suffering on an entire community, and in doing this it can lead to the annihilation of the targeted culture.

== Perpetrators ==
The RUF, even though they had access to women, who had been abducted for use as either sex slaves or combatants, frequently raped non-combatants. The militia also carved the RUF initials into women's bodies, which placed them at risk of being mistaken for enemy combatants if they were captured by government forces. Women who were in the RUF were expected to provide sexual services to the male members of the militia. And of all women interviewed, only two had not been repeatedly subjected to sexual violence; gang rape and individual rapes were commonplace. A report from PHR stated that the RUF was guilty of 93 percent of sexual assaults during the conflict. The RUF was notorious for human rights violations, and regularly amputated arms and legs from their victims.

== Estimates of victims ==
Trafficking by military and militias of women and girls, for use as sex slaves is well documented. With reports from recent conflicts such as those in, Angola, the former Yugoslavia, Sierra Leone, Liberia, the DRC, Indonesia, Colombia, Burma and Sudan. During the decade long civil conflict in Sierra Leone, women were used as sex slaves having been trafficked into refugee camps. According to PHR, one third of women who reported sexual violence had been kidnapped, with fifteen per cent forced into sexual slavery. The PHR report also showed that ninety four per cent of internally displaced households had been victims of some form of violence. PHR estimated that there were between 215,000 and 257,000 victims of rape during the conflict.

Of the types of assaults reported seventy-six percent were multiple perpetrator rape (MPR), with seventy-five percent of these being perpetrated by male only groups. The remaining twenty-five percent of sexual assaults were carried out by mixed sex groups, which indicates that one in four incidents of MPR women had actively participated.

HRW reported that "Throughout the nine-year Sierra Leonean conflict there has been widespread and systematic sexual violence against women and girls including individual and gang rape, sexual assault with objects such as firewood, umbrellas and sticks, and sexual slavery," and that "the rebel factions use sexual violence as a weapon to terrorise, humiliate, punish and ultimately control the civilian population into submission.'"

== Aftermath ==
The violence directed towards women during the conflict was extraordinarily brutal. Militias were indiscriminate about the ages of those assaulted, and there was a marked tendency towards younger women and girls believed to be virgins. Some women were raped with such violence they bled to death following the assault. A report by MSF showed that fifty five per cent of survivors had suffered gang rape, with the attacks usually involving insertion of objects such as knives and burning firewood into the vagina.

There were reports of pregnant women being eviscerated with rebels placing wagers on the gender of the unborn child. Thirty four per cent of survivors have reported that they have caught a sexually transmitted disease, and a further fifteen per cent have reported being ostracised by their family due to having been raped. Six percent reported that they had been forcibly impregnated. Women who had been kidnapped and who had spent years living in the bush have reported severe health problems, such as tuberculosis, malnutrition, malaria, skin and intestinal infections, and respiratory diseases.

== International and domestic reaction ==
The International Rescue Committee, in conjunction with the Sierra Leone government founded three Sexual Assault Referral Centers (SARC). Locally the SARC project are called "rainbow centers" and they give free psychosocial and medical care as well as offering legal advice. The United Nations High Commissioner for Refugees has singled out the SARC project as a "best-practice gender-based violence program".

== Post-war trials ==
The Special Court for Sierra Leone (SCSL), was founded on 16 January 2002, and at first adopted the definition of rape as laid down by the International Criminal Tribunal for the former Yugoslavia in the Dragoljub Kunarac case. (Note: (1) The non-consensual penetration, however slight, of the vagina or anus of the victim by the penis of the perpetrator or by any other object used by the perpetrator, or of the mouth of the victim by the penis of the perpetrator; and (2) The intent to effect this sexual penetration, and the knowledge that it occurs without the consent of the victim.") The prosecutor of the SCSL focused on investigating gender-related crimes, which resulted in the indictment of thirteen people for gender-related violence. In 2007 a trial chamber of the SCSL found that forced marriage was a crime against humanity, and the appeal chamber upheld this judgement in 2008 stating, "forced marriage is a distinct, inhumane act of sufficient gravity to be considered a crime against humanity" (Note: "The SCSL defined the crime of forced marriage as a situation in which the perpetrator through his words or conduct, or those of someone for whose actions he is responsible, compels a person by force, threat of force, or coercion to serve as a conjugal partner resulting in severe suffering, or physical, mental or psychological injury to the victim.") The prosecutor of the SCSL charged Brima Bazzy Kamara, Alex Tamba Brima and Santigie Borbor Kanu, who were leaders of the AFRC, with counts of sexual slavery, forced marriages, and other forms of sexual violence committed by the men under their command.

On 20 June 2007, the three members of the AFRC were found guilty of rape as a crime against humanity, and sexual slavery as a war crime. They were also found guilty of recruiting child soldiers, who had also carried out acts of sexual violence on non-combatants. The rapes in the indictment were described as "brutal", and were often in the form of gang rape.

The trials of Samuel Hinga Norman, Moinina Fofana and Allieu Kondewa, known as the "Civil Defence Forces case", made little mention of gender-related crimes, this was due to the majority of the trial chamber's judges systematically excluding evidence. This decision was criticised by the appeals chamber, however it declined a request for a new trial. The trial of three RUF members was the first time in either a national or international court convicted individuals for forced marriage and sexual slavery as a crime against humanity.

== See also ==
- Rape during the Congo civil wars
- Rape during the Rwandan genocide

== Bibliography ==
- Bellelli, Roberto (2010). International Criminal Justice: Law and Practice from the Rome Statute to its Review. Ashgate. ISBN 978-1-4094-0267-1.
- Canning, Victoria (2012). "Who's Human? Developing sociological understandings of the rights of women raped in conflict". In Patricia Hynes; Michele Lamb; Damien Short; Matthew Waites (eds.). Sociology and Human Rights: New Engagements. Routledge. pp. 39–54. ISBN 978-0-415-63430-4.
- Cohen, Dara Kay (2013). "Female Combatants and the Perpetration of Violence: Wartime Rape in the Sierra Leone Civil War" (PDF). World Politics. 65 (3): 383–415. doi:10.1017/S0043887113000105. S2CID 46185439.
- Reis, Chen; Amowitz, Lynn L.; Hare Lyons, Kristina; Iacopino, Vincent; Burkhalter, Holly; Heisler, Michele; Askin, Kelly (2002). War-Related Sexual Violence in Sierra Leone A Population-Based Assessment (PDF). Physicians for Human Rights. ISBN 1-879707-37-3.
- Chernor Jalloh, Charles (2012). "Interlocutory Decisions – Trial Chamber". In Chernor Jalloh, Charles; Meisenberg, Simon M. (eds.). The Law Reports of the Special Court for Sierra Leone. Vol. 1. Martinus Nijhoff. ISBN 978-90-04-18911-9.
- Decker, Michele R.; Oram, Siân; Gupta, Jhumka; Silverman, Jay G. (2009). "Forced Prostitution and Trafficking for Sexual Exploitation Among Women and Girls in Situations of Migration and Conflict: Review and Recommendations for Reproductive Health Care Personnel". In Susan Forbes Martin; John Tirman (eds.). Women, Migration, and Conflict: Breaking a Deadly Cycle. Springer. pp. 63–86. ISBN 978-90-481-2824-2.
- Denov, Myriam (2010). Child Soldiers: Sierra Leone's Revolutionary United Front. Cambridge University Press. ISBN 978-0-521-87224-9.
- Eriksson, Maria (2010). Defining Rape: Emerging Obligations for States Under International Law?. Örebro University Press. ISBN 978-91-7668-730-7.
- Kennedy, Caroline; Waldman, Thomas (2014). "The Changing Nature of Intrastate Conflict and 'New Wars'". In Newman, Edward; DeRouen, Jr, Karl (eds.). Routledge Handbook of Civil Wars. Routledge. pp. 213–310. ISBN 978-0-415-62258-5.
- Leaning, Jennifer; Susan Bartels; Hani Mowafi (2009). "Sexual Violence during War and Forced Migration". In Susan Forbes Martin; John Tirman (eds.). Women, Migration, and Conflict: Breaking a Deadly Cycle. Springer. pp. 173–199. ISBN 978-90-481-2824-2.
- MacKenzie, Megan (2009). "The international politics of rape, sex and the family in Sierra Leone" (PDF). ISS Africa (203).
- Martin, Susan; Amber Callaway (2009). "Sexual Violence during War and Forced Migration". In Susan Forbes Martin; John Tirman (eds.). Women, Migration, and Conflict: Breaking a Deadly Cycle. Springer. pp. 173–199. ISBN 978-90-481-2824-2.
- Meyersfeld, Bonita (2012). "Implementing the Rome Statute in Africa: Potential and problems of the prosecution of gender crimes in Africa in accordance with the Rome Statute". In Ambos, Kai; Maunganidze, Ottilia A. (eds.). Défis Et Opportunités Pour la Justice Pénale Internationale en Afrique SubSaharienne. Universitätsverlag Göttingen. pp. 145–178. ISBN 978-3-86395-078-1.
- Mustapha, Marda (2003). "Civil Conflict, Sexual Violence, and HIV/AIDS". In Singhal, Arvind; Howard, W. Stephen (eds.). The Children of Africa Confront AIDS: From Vulnerability to Possibility. Ohio University Press. pp. 40–50. ISBN 978-0-89680-232-2.
- Oosterveld, Valerie (2013). "Evaluating the Special Court for Sierra Leone's Gender Jurisprudence". In Charles Chernor Jalloh (ed.). The Sierra Leone Special Court and its Legacy: The Impact for Africa and International Criminal Law. Cambridge University Press. pp. 234–259. ISBN 978-1-107-02914-9.
- Oosterveld, Valerie (2011). "The Gender Jurisprudence of the Special Court for Sierra Leone: Progress in the Revolutionary United Front Judgments". Cornell International Law Journal. 44 (1): 49–74. SSRN 1933437.
- Simpson, Deanna (7 February 2013). "Sierra Leone". Women Under Siege.
- Smith-Spark, Laura (8 December 2004). "How did rape become a weapon of war?". British Broadcasting Corporation.
- Wood, Elisabeth J. (2013). "Multiple perpetrator rape during war". In Horvath, Miranda A.H; Woodhams, Jessica (eds.). Handbook on the Study of Multiple Perpetrator Rape: A multidisciplinary response to an international problem. Routledge. pp. 132–159. ISBN 978-0-415-50044-9.
