= Monica Tabengwa =

Lawyer and researcher on LGBTIQ issues

Monica Tabengwa is a lawyer and researcher from Botswana who works for Pan-Africa ILGA and Human Rights Watch (HRW). She is a specialist on LGBT issues in sub-Saharan Africa. Tabengwa has written on violence and discrimination faced by LGBT people in sub-Saharan Africa.

Tabengwa is a member of the drafting committee and a signatory of the Yogyakarta Principles plus 10.

== Selected bibliography ==
- Ghoshal, Neela; Tabengwa, Monica (2015), The Issue is Violence : Attacks on LGBT People on Kenya's Coast, Human Rights Watch
- Tabengwa, Monica (2013), "It's nature, not a crime" : discriminatory laws and LGBT people in Liberia, Human Rights Watch, ISBN 9781623130787
- Tabengwa, Monica & Nicol, Nancy (2013). "The development of sexual rights and the LGBT movement in Botswana" (PDF). In Lennox, Corinne (ed.). Human Rights, Sexual Orientation and Gender Identity in The Commonwealth: Struggles for Decriminalisation and Change. School of Advanced Study, University of London. pp. 352–362.
