= International Service for Human Rights =

Nonprofit organization

- Founded: 1984
- Location: New York, United States
- Region served: worldwide
- Products: Human Rights Monitor
- Method: supporting human rights defenders, strengthening human rights systems, and leading and participating in coalitions for human rights change
- Key people: Phil Lynch – Executive Director; Rosemary McCreery – Chair; Chris Sidoti – Vice-Chair; Michael H. Posner
- Website: ishr.ch

The International Service for Human Rights (ISHR) is an independent, non-profit organization with offices in Geneva and New York which promotes and protects human rights by supporting human rights defenders, strengthening human rights standards and systems, and leading and participating in coalitions for human rights change.

Established in 1984, ISHR's role is to support human rights defenders by building their capacity and expertise, strengthening their recognition and protection under international law, and protecting them from threats, risks and reprisals. ISHR provides human rights defenders with a range of tools and support, including access to high-quality research and analysis, tailored training and capacity building services, legal advice and strategic litigation, and advocacy and networking support. ISHR works to strengthen human rights systems.

== History ==
ISHR has been involved in the development of international standards and protection mechanisms relevant to human rights defenders. These include advocacy around the drafting of the 1996 ECOSOC Resolution providing for the accreditation of NGOs to participate in the work of the Commission on Human Rights and the drafting of the UN Declaration on the Right and Responsibility of Individuals, Groups and Organs of Society to Promote and Protect Universally Recognized Human Rights and Fundamental Freedoms in 1998. ISHR's advocacy was also assisted in the creation of the mandates of the UN and African Commission on Human and Peoples' Rights special rapporteurs on human rights defenders in 2000 and 2005, respectively.

In 2003, ISHR assumed a facilitating role at the NGO Forum prior to the annual meeting of African Commission and became a co-facilitator of NGOs for the Asia Pacific Forum in 2006.

In 2006, ISHR was instrumental in the drafting of the Yogyakarta Principles on the application of international human rights law in relation to sexual orientation and gender identity. It also played a central role in the creation of the United Nations Human Rights Council, particularly the drafting of the modalities of the Universal Periodic Review mechanism (UPR) and the review of the system of special procedures.

In 201,1 ISHR's sustained advocacy on the issue of reprisals and intimidation faced by human rights defenders led to the adoption of a UN Human Rights Council resolution condemning and strengthening protections against reprisals.

In 2012, working with NGO partners such as Amnesty International, ISHR led civil society efforts to strengthen UN human rights treaty body, prevent their weakening, and better connect their work with victims and human rights defenders.

In 2013, an ISHR proposal to develop a model national law on the recognition and protection of human rights defenders was unanimously endorsed by the International Human Rights Experts Conference. Working with supportive states and NGOs, ISHR advocacy led to the adoption of a Human Rights Council resolution calling on all States to review and amend national laws to respect and protect the work of human rights defenders.

== Publications ==
ISHR publishes periodic digital human rights monitors, including the monthly Human Rights Monitor, together with periodic monitors on the UN Human Rights Council, the UN General Assembly and the African Commission on Human and Peoples' Rights while they are in session. These monitors highlight developments in the international and regional human rights systems, as well as events, meetings and opportunities for engagement by NGOs and national human rights institutions.

In addition to the human rights monitors, ISHR produces regular news pieces and articles, analytic and research reports, briefing papers, manuals and handbooks for human rights defenders. The organisation also publishes opinion pieces from international human rights experts.

== Assets ==
- ISHR's information products and news stories are delivered in real time or shortly after the meetings take place.
- ISHR conducts regular training courses on the use of the main UN human rights mechanisms, including the Human Rights Council, the special procedures, the treaty bodies and the Universal Periodic Review (UPR). The Human Rights Defenders Advocacy Programme in Geneva, equips human rights defenders with the knowledge and skills to strategically integrate the system into their existing work at the national level. The programme also provides an opportunity for participants to directly engage in lobbying and advocacy activities at the UN level with the aim to effect change on the ground back home.

== Funding ==
ISHR receives its financial support from major and individual donors. These include governments, trusts and foundations, law firms and private individuals.
