= Rosalind P. Petchesky =

American political scientist (born 1942)

Rosalind Pollack Petchesky (born August 16, 1942) is an American political scientist, and Distinguished Professor of Political Science at Hunter College, City University of New York. She is the founder of the International Reproductive Rights Research Action Group (IRRAG).

== Early life and education ==
Rosalind Pollack Petchesky was born in Bay City, Texas to Roberta Friedman and Simon Pollack. She grew up in Tulsa, Oklahoma in a Liberal Zionist family.

Petchesky graduated from Smith College summa cum laude, and has a Ph.D. in political science from Columbia University. She previously taught at Ramapo College.

== Career ==
Petchesky is known for incorporating differing theoretical frameworks, including ethics, political philosophy, history, political science, and others, into the study of reproductive rights.

From 1972 to 1987 she was Professor of Political and Social Theory at Ramapo College of New Jersey. In 1987 she was hired as Professor of Political Science and Coordinator of Women's Studies at Hunter College in New York. Petchesky lectures widely and is the author/editor of many professional articles and numerous books.

Petchesky is on the international advisory board of Signs, an international journal in women's and gender studies.

== Activism ==
Petchesky describes her youth as "involved and influenced" by the Civil rights movement. She stopped attending synagogue when her father and rabbis did not support her anti-racist activism. She says that a class at Smith College under Ibrahim Abu-Lughod was her first interaction with a Palestinian. Following her retirement from academia, she dedicated herself to Anti-Zionist organizing with Jewish Voice for Peace. In 2021, Petchesky co-editied the book "A Land With A People: Palestinians and Jews Confront Zionism."

On October 27, 2023, Petchesky was the oldest person arrested at Grand Central Terminal in a protest calling for a ceasefire in the Gaza war. She organized a group of more than 30 Jewish seniors to participate. She was also among a group of 18 Jewish elder women who chained themselves to the White House front gate prior to the annual Hanukkah party.

== Awards ==
- 1995 MacArthur Fellows Program

== Works ==
- Petchesky, Rosalind P. (1984). "Abortion and Woman's Choice: The State, Sexuality, and Reproductive Freedom". Boston: Northeastern University Press: 412. The first edition was winner of the American Historical Association's 1984 Joan Kelly Memorial Prize in Women's History. Second revised edition: 1990.
- Petchesky, Rosalind P. (1985), "Abortion in the 1980's: feminist morality and women's health", in Lewin, Ellen; Olesen, Virginia (eds.), Women, Health, and Healing: Toward a New Perspective, New York: Tavistock Publications
- Petchesky, Rosalind P. (Summer 1987). "Fetal Images: The Power of Visual Culture in the Politics of Reproduction". Feminist Studies. 13 (2): 263–292. doi:10.2307/3177802. hdl:2027/spo.0499697.0013.203. JSTOR 3177802. S2CID 41193716.
- Petchesky, Rosalind P. (Fall 2003). "Response". Dissent. University of Pennsylvania Press.
- Petchesky, Rosalind P. (October 2001). "Phantom towers: feminist reflections on the battle between global capitalism and fundamentalist terrorism". Socialistische Positionen [Socialist Positions]. Germany.
- Petchesky, Rosalind P. (22 March 2006). "On the unstable marriage of reproductive and sexual rights: the case for a trial separation". Conscience. Catholics for Choice.
- Petchesky, Rosalind P. (2000), "Sexual rights: inventing a concept, mapping an international practice", in Parker, Richard G.; Barbosa, Regina M.; Aggleton, Peter (eds.), Framing the sexual subject: the politics of gender, sexuality, and power, Berkeley: University of California Press, pp. 81–103, ISBN 9780520218383. Preview.
- Petchesky, Rosalind P. (1997), "Spiraling discourses of reproductive and sexual rights", in Tronto, Joan C.; Cohen, Cathy J.; Jones, Kathleen B. (eds.), Women transforming politics: an alternative reader, New York: New York University Press, ISBN 9780814715581. Preview.
- Petchesky, Rosalind P. (September 2012). Perspectivas críticas sobre el empoderamiento [Society for International Development]. Gender and Diversity Department, Buenos Aires Chapter.
- Petchesky R. P. & Alexander M. (2014). Debt. Feminist Press at the City University of New York. ISBN 9781558618541
- Farmer, E., Petchesky, R. P., Sills, S., & Erakat, N. (2021). A land with a people : Palestinians and Jews confront Zionism : a collection of personal stories, history, poetry, and art. Monthly Review Press. ISBN 9781583679296
