= Rape during the Darfur genocide (2003–2005) =

Throughout the Darfur genocide in the Darfur war there has been a systematic campaign of rape, which has been used as a weapon of war, in the ethnic cleansing of black Africans from the region. The majority of rapes have been carried out by the Sudanese government forces and the Janjaweed ("evil men on horseback") paramilitary groups. The actions of the Janjaweed have been described as genocidal rape, with not just women, but children also being raped, as well as babies being bludgeoned to death and the sexual mutilation of victims being commonplace.

The genocide, which is being carried out against the Fur, Masalit and the Zaghawa ethnic peoples has led to the International Criminal Court (ICC) indicting several people for crimes against humanity, rape, forced transfer and torture. According to Eric Reeves more than one million children have been "killed, raped, wounded, displaced, traumatized, or endured the loss of parents and families".

== Rape as a weapon of war ==
Due to the ongoing violence it has not been possible for researchers to conduct population based studies, and there are no estimates as yet of the number of victims. It is believed that the rapes are widespread, and the victims are estimated to be in the tens of thousands. One NGO documented 9,300 rapes, however observers in country have stated the number of those raped are closer to double the 9,300 documented.

There have been reports of girls under the age of ten to women over seventy being raped, and that the majority of victims had suffered from being gang raped. Children aged five have been raped, and one third of rape victims are children. As of 2009, reports and testimonials concluded that the campaign of rape was systematic and had been ongoing for five years. In a statement to the UN former secretary general Kofi Annan said "In Darfur, we see whole populations displaced, and their homes destroyed, while rape is used as a deliberate strategy."

== International response ==
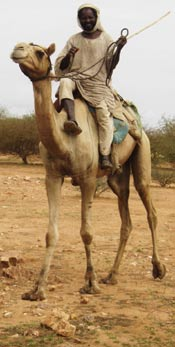
Arab Janjaweed tribes have been a major player in the conflict.

The United States Agency for International Development (USAID) reported that in a remote area of Darfur local leaders had stated that over four hundred women and girls had been raped, and that some of these women had been raped in full view of their husbands. USAID also reported that they had gotten reports of women being branded by the Janjaweed following rapes.

Writing in Foreign Affairs, American political scientist Scott Straus stated that a U.S. official had reported that 574 villages had been razed and another 157 damaged between the middle of 2003 and September 2004, with most of these villages having no armed rebel presence when the attacks occurred. Depositions by survivors consistently indicate that the militias target men for execution, and that the elderly, women and children are not spared. For women rape is the primary threat. Between the middle of October 2004 and February 2005 it was estimated that up to six million Darfurians were displaced and a further 200,000 had sought asylum in Chad.

In 2004, the U.S. State Department released a report on the atrocities which ran to eight pages. The report stated that there was "a consistent and widespread pattern of atrocities in the Darfur region of western Sudan" and that there was a clear "pattern of abuse against members of Darfur's non-Arab communities, including murder, rape, beatings, ethnic humiliation, and destruction of property and basic necessities." The report also suggested the number of rapes were more than likely underestimated, as acknowledging that a female member of the family had been raped leads to social stigma. In The New York Times, an unnamed observer of the situation was quoted as saying: "In this society if you rape one woman, you have raped the entire tribe."

On 7 March 2005, Médecins Sans Frontières issued a report which stated that they had treated five hundred rape victims, both women and girls, and that this was but a fraction of those who have been assaulted sexually.

In 2007 the NGO, Global Grassroots in association with Gretchen Steidle Wallace produced the documentary, The Devil Came on Horseback. Based on the book of the same title which was written by Brian Steidle after his experiences in Darfur it was nominated for an emmy award. In 2009 the United States Holocaust Memorial Museum hosted a documentary film on the sexual violence in Darfur.

Nicholas Kristof has traveled to Darfur five times over a period of two years, and his accounts of the ongoing violence has played a major role in raising awareness of the situation in Darfur. In February 2005, he published photographs he had received from the African Union peacekeeping troops.

== Proceedings of the International Criminal Court ==
Luis Moreno-Ocampo, prosecutor for the International Criminal Court (ICC), having filed charges for crimes against humanity, is also pursuing in his application the charge of genocidal rape as such actions can be tried before the ICC as stand-alone crimes.

On 27 April 2007 the chamber issued an arrest warrant for Ahmed Haroun on charges of crimes against humanity. Moreno-Ocampo, prosecutor for the ICC accused Haroun, who was Minister of State at the time of the crimes, of arming and recruiting for the Janjaweed, with the sole purpose being the suppression of rebel attacks. Moreno-Ocampo has asserted that Haroun was "present as arms were distributed to fighters, had full knowledge of atrocities including rape and murder happening on the ground, and incited militias to slaughter civilians in speeches."

On 4 June 2007, the ICC issued a warrant for the arrest of Ali Mohamed Ali Abd-Al-Rahman (Ali Kushayb) on over forty charges of crimes against humanity and war crimes. Allegations against him include, but are not limited to mass murder, forced displacements and rape.

On 4 March 2009 Sudanese president Omar Hassan Ahmad al-Bashir was indicted by the ICC on five counts of crimes against humanity (murder, extermination, forcible transfer, torture, rape) and two counts of war crimes (direct attacks on civilians and pillaging). He is the first sitting head of state to have been indicted for crimes against humanity. A second warrant was issued for his arrest on 12 July 2010, as the Pre-Trial Chamber I of the ICC believed there were reasonable grounds that al-Bashir was culpable on three counts of genocide which had been carried out on the Fur, Masalit and the Zaghawa ethnic peoples.

== Bibliography ==
- Ball, Howard (2011). Genocide: A Reference Handbook. ABC-CLIO. ISBN 978-1598844887.
- Bartrop, Paul R. (2012). A Biographical Encyclopedia of Contemporary Genocide: Portraits of Evil and Good. ABC-CLIO. ISBN 978-0313386787.
- Clark Miller, Sarah (2009). "Atrocity, Harm, and Resistance: A Situated Understanding of Genocidal Rape". In Andrea Veltman, Kathryn J. Norlock (ed.). Evil, Political Violence, and Forgiveness: Essays in Honor of Claudia Card. Lexington. pp. 53–76. ISBN 978-0739136508.
- Dubuisson, Marc (4 June 2007). "Situation in Darfur" (PDF). International Criminal Court. Archived from the original (PDF) on 3 January 2014.
- Frey, Rebecca Joyce (2009). Genocide and International Justice. Facts On File. ISBN 978-0816073108.
- GOMA (13 January 2011). "War's overlooked victims". The Economist.
- Hagan, John; Rymond-Richmond, Wenona; Parker, Patricia (2005). "The Criminology of Genocide: The Death and Rape of Darfur" (PDF). Criminology. 43 (3): 525–562. doi:10.1111/j.0011-1348.2005.00016.x.
- Gingerich, Tara; Leaning, Jennifer (2004). The Use of Rape as a Weapon of War in the Conflict in Darfur, Sudan (PDF). Harvard School of Public Health.
- Grono, Nick (2014). "Darfur: The International Community's Failure to Protect". Explaining Darfur: Lectures on the Ongoing Genocide. Amsterdam University Press. pp. 37–48. ISBN 978-9056294250.
- The Hague Justice Portal (2011). "Omar Hassan Ahmad al-Bashir". The Hague Justice Portal.
- Hashim, Nadra O. (2009). Language and Collective Mobilization: The Story of Zanzibar. Lexington. ISBN 978-0739122112.
- Hirsch, Michele Lent (8 February 2012). "Darfur-Sudan". Women Under Siege.
- Natsios, Andrew S. (2006). "Moving Beyond the Sense of Alarm". In Samuel Totten, Eric Markusen (ed.). Genocide in Darfur: Investigating the Atrocities in the Sudan. Routledge. ISBN 978-0415953290.
- Rothe, Dawn (2009). State Criminality: The Crime of All Crimes. Lexington. ISBN 978-0739126721.
- Scheffer, David (3 November 2008). "Rape as genocide". The New York Times.
- Simons, Marlise; Neil MacFarquhar (4 March 2009). "Court Issues Arrest Warrant for Sudan's Leader". The New York Times. "After months of deliberation, the judges charged Mr. Bashir with war crimes and crimes against humanity for playing an "essential role" in the murder, rape, torture, pillage and displacement of large numbers of civilians in Darfur."
- Straus, Scott (2005). "Darfur and the Genocide Debate". Foreign Affairs. 84 (1): 123–133. doi:10.2307/20034212. JSTOR 20034212.
- Totten, Samuel (2006). "Chronology: The Darfur Crisis". In Samuel Totten, Eric Markusen (ed.). Genocide in Darfur: Investigating the Atrocities in the Sudan. Routledge. ISBN 978-0415953290.
- Totten, Samuel (2010). An Oral and Documentary History of the Darfur Genocide. Praeger. ISBN 978-0313352355.
- "One Night, One Voice: Spotlighting Rape as a War Crime". United States Holocaust Memorial Museum.
