= Bugesera massacres =

1992 massacres in Rwanda

Bugesera Massacres
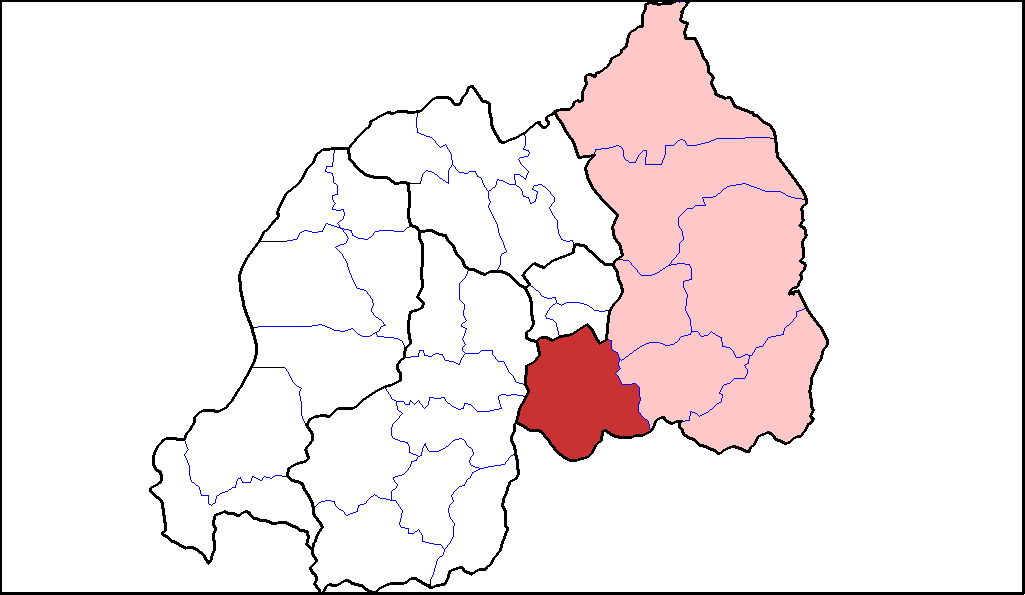
- Bugesera District where the massacres happened
- Location: 2.23295°S 30.158911°E; Bugesera District
- Date: March 1992
- Attack type: Genocidal massacre
- Deaths: 300+
- Victim: Tutsi
- Perpetrators: Ferdinand Nahimana, Hutu civilians, Hutu Power militants
- Motive: broadcasting Disinformation on Radio Rwanda

The Bugesera massacres were a series of attacks perpetrated by people belonging to the Hutu ethnicity, against Tutsi civilians in the Bugesera District of southeastern Rwanda. The massacres occurred in March 1992, after false information was broadcast by Radio Rwanda. Some observers saw this as a prelude to the genocide of the Tutsi in Rwanda that took place in 1994.

== Background ==
Bugesera, a district located southeast of Kigali and bordering Burundi, comprises three sectors: Kanzenze, Gashora and Ngenda. Tutsis were " forcibly settled there after November 1959, when the Nyamata refugee camp was created". Depending on the area, they constituted up to 40% of the population.

=== Role of the Media ===
The public station Radio Rwanda fell into the hands of Hutu extremists who started to broadcast hateful propaganda against the Tutsi. In 1992 Ferdinand Nahimana ordered Radio Rwanda to broadcasts false information allegeding that the Rwandan Patriotic Front (RPF), had allegedly drawn up a kill-list of local Hutus. In late February or early March, Radio Rwanda broadcast a leaflet, "falsely attributed to the Liberal Party, [The Leaflet] claimed that some twenty prominent figures of Hutu origin—the majority ethnic group in Rwanda and dominant within the government—were going to be assassinated": the alleged document was supposedly released by "Committee for Non-Violence in Rwanda" The Leaflet revelead a "destabilization plan", in which the third and imminent phase of which would be triggered by "foreign terrorist agents" infiltrating the population . The announcement was repeated several times in the following days. At the same time, Hassan Ngeze, director of the magazine Kangura, traveled to Rwanda to also spread false information. Referring to the danger of an attack by the Inyenzi (Note: In Kinyarwanda, the term means "cockroaches". Initially referring to refugees, it was later used to describe fighters of the RPF. Ultimately, it came to designate all members of the Tutsi community), one of the leaflets he distributed on the March 1st to the population ends with "We must not let them [the Inyenzi] escape us!", language echoing those of Léon Mugesera. For Alison Des Forges, this is a typical case of mirror accusation, a propaganda technique which consists of attributing to the opposing side what one is preparing to do in order for the listeners to feel threatened and then act with the feeling of being in a situation of " legitimate defense.

== The massacres ==
On 4 March 1992 Tutsi began to be targeted in several localities. The Massacres continued from March 4 to 10. The massacres were perpetrated by "civilians under the leadership of their mayor" although witnesses reported that the groups were supervised by armed men "brought in from outside". The armed men conisted of Interahamwe and Hutu soldiers from the Rwandan Armed Force (FAR), some of the armed men were also from the presidential guard. The role of the FAR, though more "passive," remained effective: they disarmed those who tried to defend themselves and then blocked access to the parish of Nyamata, thus leaving the Tutsis at the mercy of the attackers. Furthermore, the civil and military authorities gathered the Tutsis in certain locations, such as municipal offices, where they were then massacred. Nevertheless, they did not attempt to enter the churches, where many civilians spontaneously sought refuge. Access to food and water was cut off to force the Tutsis to return home, the authorities did not yet have sufficient organization and logistics to attack these sanctuaries, unlike what would happen during the three months of the genocide two years later. Jean-Baptiste Gatete, mayor of Murambi who was later convicted by the ICTR participated in the massacres.

At the time, Interior Minister Sylvestre Nsanzimana announced that the massacres had killed 60 civilians, while the opposition reported 150 deaths, as well as the arson of hundreds of houses, leaving between "6000 and 9000 Tutsi civilians" without shelter or food. The final death toll according to the Rwandan government was 182.

When questioned by members of an investigative mission consisting of several NGOs, the mayor of Kanzenze, Fidèle Rwambuka, initially denied knowing the origin of the massacres. He then presented a letter written by some of his constituents to exonerate him, a letter attempting to justify the killings on the grounds of "defamation" allegedly uttered by "Tutsi activists" against the mayor during a meeting held on March 1, 1992. His responsibility and that of the sub-prefect was nevertheless established from the start. On March 9 the French embassy in Rwanda, sent two staff members to the area, as well as the soldiers from the Gendarmerie. The Duclert report adds that Georges Martres — ambassador in office at the time of the events — did not deny the ethnic nature of the violence.

== Aftermath ==
=== Dismissal of Ferdinand Nahima ===
Following the installation of the coalition government in April 1992, The MDR, the PL, and the PSD demanded changes within the media, particularly Radio Rwanda. This was compounded by international pressure that left Juvénal Habyarimana with no choice but to act. Because of his role in the Bugesera massacres, which he helped to instigate, Ferdinand Nahimana was dismissed from his position as director of ORINFOR (Rwandan Information Office), where he had coordinated the public radio station, without any other sanctions. After the dismissal he established, a private radio station: Radio Télévision Libre des Mille Collines (RTLM), which played a crucial role in inciting the genocide in 1994.

=== Prosecution ===
The Kigali prosecutor's office arrested around 450 individuals, many of whom were released very quickly, others due to a procedural flaw; ten months after the events, no one had been tried and the survivors had received no restitution.
