= Simon Bikindi =

Rwandan singer-songwriter

- Bikindi at the United Nations Detention Facility in 2011
- Born: 28 September 1954; Rwerere, Ruanda-Urundi
- Died: 15 December 2018 (aged 64); Cotonou, Benin
- Occupations: Musician, civil servant
- Status: Deceased
- Criminal charges: Direct and Public Incitement to Commit Genocide (by the ICTR in 2008)
- Penalty: 15 years imprisonment

Details
- Imprisoned at: Porto-Novo Prison (Benin)

Simon Bikindi (28 September 1954 – 15 December 2018) was a Rwandan musician and singer who was prominent in Rwanda during the 1980s and 1990s. His patriotic and ultranationalist songs were playlist staples on the national radio station Radio Rwanda during the Rwandan Civil War. For his actions during the Rwandan genocide, he was tried and convicted for incitement to genocide by the International Criminal Tribunal for Rwanda (ICTR) in 2008.

== Background and role during the genocide ==
Bikindi, an ethnic Hutu, was born in Rwerere in the northwestern prefecture of Gisenyi, the same region from which former Rwandan President Juvenal Habyarimana and many of the key figures in his MRND regime originated.

At the time of the genocide, he was a "well-known composer and singer of popular music and director of the performance group Irindiro Ballet." His songs were described as having "elliptical lyrics and catchy tunes", mixing English, French and Kinyarwanda and combining rap-style texts with traditional folk song melodies. His first cassette, released in 1990, was of traditional wedding songs. He was additionally a civil servant of the Ministry of Youth and Sport and a member of the MRND party.

Some of his songs directed against the Tutsi were played on Radio Télévision Libre des Mille Collines to incite killings. He left the country a few days before the beginning of the genocide but returned later in June. It is a matter of debate whether and to what extent he participated in the genocide as such, but according to the ruling of the International Criminal Tribunal for Rwanda (ICTR), it is proved beyond reasonable doubt that he was associated with the extremist Interahamwe militia and publicly urged Hutus to exterminate all Tutsis in June 1994. After the RPF takeover, he fled the country. His songs are banned in Rwanda since 1994.

== Trial ==
=== Indictment and arrest ===
Bikindi was indicted by the International Criminal Tribunal for Rwanda (ICTR). He was charged with the following: conspiracy to commit genocide; genocide, or alternatively complicity in genocide; direct and public incitement to commit genocide, and murder and persecution, as crimes against humanity. The indictment stated that Bikindi "composed, sang, recorded or distributed musical works extolling Hutu solidarity and accusing Tutsis of enslaving Hutus". The prosecution cited a song entitled "The Awakening" but commonly referred to as "I hate these Hutus" ("Nanga Abahutu"), which attacked "pro-Tutsi" Hutus and specifically those Hutus who collaborated with the Tutsi Rwandan Patriotic Front insurgents against the government.

In addition, it was argued that in the months prior to the genocide, Bikindi had "consulted with President Juvénal Habyarimana, Minister of Youth and Sports Callixte Nzabonimana and MRND-aligned military authorities on song lyrics" before releasing them to be played on the Hutu Power radio station RTLM. The prosecution also claimed that during the 100 days of genocide from 7 April to 14 July 1994, Bikindi participated personally in the killings, both in Kigali and Gisenyi prefecture, and helped to recruit and organise Interahamwe militias.

Following his arrest in Leiden, Netherlands on 12 July 2001, Bikindi fought extradition and requested asylum. However, eight months later, on 27 March 2002, he was placed in the custody of the ICTR. He subsequently entered a plea of not guilty to all the charges against him and was imprisoned at the United Nations Detention Facility (UNDF) in Arusha, Tanzania. After a series of delays, his war crimes trial was set to begin on 15 May 2006. He was represented by the chairman of the Kenyan section of the International Commission of Jurists (ICJ), Wilfred Ngunjiri Nderitu.

=== Details ===
In addition to other evidence, the prosecution cited a song celebrating the abolition of monarchy and the regaining of independence from 1959 to 1961: a Rwandan expert in the trial later expounded that the latter song could not have been addressed to the Rwandan nation as a whole, because the Tutsis were associated with the Rwandan monarchy and colonial regime, and that it was impossible to hate the monarchy without hating the Tutsis. The defence argued that there were contradictions in the witness testimonies, denying that the songs were about Tutsis and invoking Tutsi witnesses whom Bikindi had allegedly "helped to save their lives".

Regarding the songs, both sides had experts on their side, but it was undeniable that the lyrics were difficult to interpret and that democracy and peace were mentioned. Bikindi's lawyer also argued that to accuse Bikindi is "to deny him his right of expression". One of the defendant's counsels was accused of having bribed a prosecution witness. The chief counsel of the defence agreed with the prosecution's accusation, which caused Bikindi to refuse to be represented by him any further. The ICTR later cleared the lawyer of that accusation.

The prosecution team in Bikindi's trial asked for a life sentence, the most severe punishment the court gives. The defence requested an acquittal.

=== Verdict and imprisonment ===
In December 2008, Bikindi was sentenced to 15 years in prison with credit for 7 years already served, for incitement to commit genocide. The conviction stemmed from the fact that the court considered it proved beyond reasonable doubt that towards the end of June 1994 he had made a speech from an Interahamwe vehicle equipped with a public address system, urging and subsequently reminding the Hutu population to exterminate all Tutsis, whom he referred to as "snakes". All the other charges were dismissed; in particular, the court considered that while some songs had an inciting character, they had all been written before 1994, thus before the genocide, and that there was not sufficient evidence to prove that Bikindi had played a role in the dissemination of his songs on radio during the genocide, or that he had personally engaged in killings or organising of militias.

Bikindi was released in 2016, having served the full length of his sentence.

=== Reception ===
The trial had been considered problematic because of the troubling possibility of an artist being arbitrarily prosecuted for his work, art being open to a variety of interpretations. The verdict, however, successfully avoided this controversial issue, as it was not based on Bikindi's songs.

== Personal life and character ==
At the time of the genocide, Bikindi had a relationship with Angeline Mukabanana, a Tutsi. In an interview for The New York Times in 2008, she expressed her opinion that Bikindi hated no one and was simply an opportunist, too eager to please. She cited the fact that Bikindi had adopted her son, who had a Tutsi father, and had helped their Tutsi neighbours against Hutu murderers. Mukabanana claimed that after Bikindi wrote "I hate these Hutus", she asked him why he had written that and pointed out the possibility of the RPF's winning the war. He allegedly answered: "The government obliges me to write these songs. If I hear the RPF is coming to Kigali next month, I'll write a song for them."

He died in Benin on December 15, 2018. Some reports state that he died of diabetes while another states that he died of prostate cancer.
