= Supremacism =

Ideology

Supremacism is the belief that a certain group of people is superior to, and should have authority over, all others. The presumed superior group can be defined by various characteristics, including age, sex, race, ethnicity, religion, sexual orientation, language, social class, ideology, nationality, culture, generation, or any other human attribute.

== National ==
=== Indian supremacism ===
In Asia, Indians in Ancient India considered all foreigners barbarians. The Muslim scholar Al-Biruni wrote that the Indians called foreigners impure. A few centuries later, Dubois observes that "Hindus look upon Europeans as barbarians totally ignorant of all principles of honour and good breeding... In the eyes of a Hindu, a Pariah (outcaste) and a European are on the same level."

=== Russian chauvinism ===
Great Russian chauvinism (Russian: великорусский шовинизм, romanized: velikorussky shovinizm) is a term defined by the early Soviet government officials, most notably Vladimir Lenin, to describe an ideology of the "dominant exploiting classes of the nation, holding a dominant (sovereign) position in the state, declaring their nation as the "superior nation". In the 1920s, Lenin promoted the policy of Korenizatsiia, for the Bolshevik party to defend the rights of oppressed nations within the former Russian Empire to self-determination, equality, and minority language rights.

=== Sinocentrism ===
Sinocentrism refers to a worldview that China is the cultural, political, or economic center of the world. Sinocentrism was a core concept in various Chinese dynasties. The Chinese considered themselves to be "all-under-Heaven", ruled by the emperor, known as Son of Heaven. Those that lived outside the Huaxia were regarded as "barbarians". In addition, states outside China, such as Vietnam, Japan or Korea, were considered to be vassals of China.

The Chinese also considered Europeans repulsive, ghost-like creatures, and they even considered them devils. Chinese writers also referred to foreigners as barbarians.

== Racial ==
=== Arab supremacism ===
In Africa, Southern Sudanese allege that they are being subjected to a racist form of Arab supremacy, which they equate with the historic white supremacy of South Africa's apartheid. The alleged genocide and ethnic cleansing in the ongoing War in Darfur has been described as an example of Arab racism. For example, in their analysis of the sources of the conflict, Julie Flint and Alex de Waal say that Colonel Gaddafi, the leader of Libya, sponsored "Arab supremacism" across the Sahara during the 1970s. Gaddafi supported the "Islamic Legion" and the Sudanese opposition "National Front, including the Muslim Brothers and the Ansar, the Umma Party's military wing." Gaddafi tried to use such forces to annex Chad from 1979 to 1981. Gaddafi supported the Sudanese government's war in the South during the early 1980s, and in return, he was allowed to use the Darfur region as a "back door to Chad". As a result, the first signs of an "Arab racist political platform" appeared in Darfur in the early 1980s.

=== Black supremacism ===
Cornel West, an African-American philosopher, writes that black supremacist religious views arose in America as a part of black Muslim theology in response to white supremacy.

==== Hutu supremacism ====
Hutu Power, or Hutu Supremacy, is an ethnic supremacist ideology that asserts the ethnic superiority of Hutu, often in the context of being superior to Tutsi and Twa, and the supposed right of Hutu to dominate and kill these two groups and other minorities. Espoused by Hutu extremists, widespread support for the ideology led to the 1994 Rwandan genocide against the Tutsi, the moderate Hutu who opposed the killings, and the Twa, who were considered traitors. Hutu Power political parties and movements included the Akazu, the Parmehutu, the Coalition for the Defence of the Republic and its Impuzamugambi militia, and the governing National Republican Movement for Democracy and Development and its Interahamwe militia. Hutu supremacy is most common in Rwanda and Burundi, where Hutu comprise most of the population. It was the main ideology of the Third Rwandese Republic.

=== White supremacism ===
Centuries of European colonialism in the Americas, Asia, Africa and Oceania were justified by Eurocentric attitudes and sometimes, they were also justified by white supremacist attitudes.

During the 19th century, "The White Man's Burden", the phrase which refers to the belief that whites have the obligation to make the societies of the other peoples more 'civilized', was widely used to justify colonial policies as a noble enterprise. Historian Thomas Carlyle, best known for his historical account of the French Revolution, The French Revolution: A History, argued that western policies were justified on the grounds that they provided the greatest benefit to "inferior" native peoples. However, even at the time of its publication in 1849, Carlyle's main work on the subject, the Occasional Discourse on the Negro Question, was poorly received by his contemporaries.

According to William Nicholls, religious antisemitism can be distinguished from racial antisemitism which is based on racial or ethnic grounds. With reference to the former, "The dividing line was the possibility of effective conversion [...] a Jew ceased to be a Jew upon baptism." However, with racial antisemitism, "Now the assimilated Jew was still a Jew, even after baptism [...] From the Enlightenment onward, it is no longer possible to draw clear lines of distinction between religious and racial forms of hostility towards Jews [...] Once Jews have been emancipated and secular thinking makes its appearance, without leaving behind the old Christian hostility towards Jews, the new term antisemitism becomes almost unavoidable, even before explicitly racist doctrines appear."

One of the first typologies which was used to classify various human races was invented by Georges Vacher de Lapouge (1854–1936), a theoretician of eugenics, who published L'Aryen et son rôle social (1899 – "The Aryan and his social role") in 1899. In his book, he divides humanity into various, hierarchical races, starting with the highest race which is the "Aryan white race, dolichocephalic", and ending with the lowest race which is the "brachycephalic", "mediocre and inert" race, that race is best represented by Southern European, Catholic peasants". Between these, Vacher de Lapouge identified the "Homo europaeus" (Teutonic, Protestant, etc.), the "Homo alpinus" (Auvergnat, Turkish, etc.), and finally the "Homo mediterraneus" (Neapolitan, Andalus, etc.) Jews were brachycephalic just like the Aryans were, according to Lapouge; but he considered them dangerous for this exact reason; they were the only group, he thought, which was threatening to displace the Aryan aristocracy. Georges Vacher de Lapouge became one of the leading inspirations of Nazi antisemitism and Nazi racist ideology.

==== United States ====
White Americans who participated in the Atlantic slave trade believed and justified their economic exploitation of African Americans by creating a scientific theory of white superiority and black inferiority. Thomas Jefferson, who was a believer of scientific racism and enslaver of over 600 African Americans (regarded as property under the Articles of Confederation), wrote that blacks were "inferior to the whites in the endowments of body and mind."

A justification for the conquest of American Indian tribes emanated from their dehumanized perception as the "merciless Indian savages", as described in the United States Declaration of Independence.

Before the outbreak of the American Civil War, the Confederate States of America was founded with a constitution that contained clauses which restricted the government's ability to limit or interfere with the institution of "negro" slavery. In the 1861 Cornerstone Speech, Confederate vice president, Alexander Stephens declared that one of the Confederacy's foundational tenets was White Supremacy over African American slaves. Following the war, a hate group, known as the Ku Klux Klan, was founded in the American South, after the end of the American Civil War. Its purpose has been to maintain White, Protestant supremacy in the US after the Reconstruction period, which it did so through violence and intimidation.

The Anti-Defamation League (ADL) and Southern Poverty Law Center condemn writings about "Jewish Supremacism" by Holocaust-denier, former Grand Wizard of the KKK, and conspiracy theorist David Duke as antisemitic — in particular, his book Jewish Supremacism: My Awakening to the Jewish Question. Kevin B. MacDonald, known for his theory of Judaism as a "group evolutionary strategy", has also been accused of being "antisemitic" and a "white supremacist" in his writings on the subject by the ADL and his own university psychology department.

==== Nazi Germany ====
From 1933 to 1945, Nazi Germany, under the rule of Adolf Hitler and the Nazi Party, promoted the belief in the existence of a superior, Aryan Herrenvolk, or master race. The state's propaganda advocated the belief that Germanic peoples, whom it called "Aryans", were a master race or a Herrenvolk whose members were superior to the Jews, Slavs, and Romani people, so-called "gypsies". Arthur de Gobineau, a French racial theorist and aristocrat, blamed the fall of the ancien régime in France on racial intermixing, which he believed had destroyed the purity of the Nordic race. Gobineau's theories, which attracted a large and strong following in Germany, emphasized the belief in the existence of an irreconcilable polarity between Aryan and Jewish cultures.

== Religious ==
=== Christianity ===
Academics Carol Lansing and Edward D. English argue that Christian supremacism was a motivation for the Crusades in the Holy Land, as well as a motivation for crusades against Muslims and pagans throughout Europe. The blood libel is a widespread European conspiracy theory which led to centuries of pogroms, expulsions and massacres of European Jewish minorities because it alleged that Jews required the pure blood of a Christian child in order to make matzah for Passover. Thomas of Cantimpré wrote the following about the blood curse which the Jews put upon themselves and all of their generations at the court of Pontius Pilate where Jesus was sentenced to death: "A very learned Jew, who in our day has been converted to the (Christian) faith, informs us that one enjoying the reputation of a prophet among them, toward the close of his life, made the following prediction: 'Be assured that relief from this secret ailment, to which you are exposed, can only be obtained through Christian blood ("solo sanguine Christiano")." The Atlantic slave trade has also been partially attributed to Christian supremacism. The Ku Klux Klan has been described as a white supremacist Christian organization, along with many other white supremacist groups, such as the Posse Comitatus and organizations which espouse Christian Identity and Positive Christianity.

=== Islam ===
Academics Khaled Abou El Fadl, Ian Lague, and Joshua Cone note that, while the Quran and other Islamic scriptures express tolerant beliefs, such as Al-Baqara 256 "there is no compulsion in religion", there have also been numerous instances of Muslim or Islamic supremacism. Examples of how supremacists have interpreted Islam include the history of slavery in the Muslim world, the history of Caliphates, the history of the Ottoman Empire, especially the early-20th-century form of pan-Islamism which was promoted by Abdul Hamid II, the jizya and the supremacy of Sharia law, such as rules of marriage in Muslim countries being imposed on non-Muslims.

Non-violent proselytism of Islam (Dawah) is not Islamic supremacism, however, forced conversion to Islam is Islamic supremacism. Death penalty for apostasy in Islam is a sign of Islamic supremacism.

Numerous massacres and ethnic cleansings of Jews, Christians and other non-Muslims occurred in some Muslim-majority countries including Morocco, Libya, and Algeria, where Jews were eventually forced to live in ghettos. Decrees ordering the destruction of synagogues were enacted during the Middle Ages in Egypt, Syria, Iraq, and Yemen. At certain times in the history of Yemen, Morocco, and Baghdad, Jews were forced to convert to Islam and if they refused to convert to Islam, the death penalty would be imposed on them. While there were antisemitic incidents before the 20th century, antisemitism increased after the Arab–Israeli conflict. Following the 1948 Arab–Israeli War, the Palestinian exodus, the creation of the State of Israel and Israeli victories during the wars of 1956 and 1967 were a severe humiliation to Israel's opponents – primarily Egypt, Syria, and Iraq. However, by the mid-1970s the vast majority of Jews had left Muslim-majority countries, moving primarily to Israel, France, and the United States. The reasons for the Jewish exodus are varied and disputed.

=== Judaism ===
Ilan Pappé, an expatriate Israeli historian, writes that the First Aliyah to Israel "established a society based on Jewish supremacy" within "settlement-cooperatives" that were Jewish owned and operated. Joseph Massad, a professor of Arab studies, believes that "Jewish supremacism" has always been a "dominating principle" in religious and secular Zionism.

Since the 1990s, Orthodox Jewish rabbis from Israel, most notably those affiliated to Chabad-Lubavitch and religious Zionist organizations, including The Temple Institute, have set up a modern Noahide movement. These Noahide organizations, led by religious Zionist and Orthodox rabbis, are aimed at non-Jews in order to convince them to commit to follow the Noahide laws. However, these religious Zionist and Orthodox rabbis that guide the modern Noahide movement, who are often affiliated with the Third Temple movement, expound a racist and supremacist ideology which consists in the belief that the Jewish people are God's chosen people and racially superior to non-Jews, and mentor Noahides because they believe that the Messianic era will begin with the rebuilding of the Third Temple on the Temple Mount in Jerusalem to re-institute the Jewish priesthood along with the practice of ritual sacrifices, and the establishment of a Jewish theocracy in Israel, supported by communities of Noahides. David Novak, professor of Jewish theology and ethics at the University of Toronto, has denounced the modern Noahide movement by stating that "If Jews are telling Gentiles what to do, it’s a form of imperialism".

In 2002, Joseph Massad said that Israel imposes a "Jewish supremacist system of discrimination" on Palestinian citizens of Israel, and he also said that this system of discrimination has been normalized within the discourse on how to end the conflict, with various parties arguing that "it is pragmatic for Palestinians to accept to live in a Jewish supremacist state as third class citizens".

In the aftermath of the 2022 Israeli legislative election, the winning right-wing coalition included an alliance known as Religious Zionist Party, which was described by Jewish-American columnist David E. Rosenberg as a political party "driven by Jewish supremacy and anti-Arab racism".

== Sexual ==
=== Male supremacism ===
Feminist scholars argue that in patriarchy, male supremacism is upheld through a variety of cultural, political, religious, sexual, and interpersonal systems and relations. Since the 19th century there have been a number of feminist movements opposed to male supremacism, usually aimed at achieving equal legal rights and protections for women in all cultural, political and interpersonal relations.

=== Female supremacism ===
Female supremacy relates to the belief that women are more capable in solving political, economic, and social problems than men. A few women first proposed that women are superior in the 1840s, and the idea expanded in 1874, during which Jane Fowler Willing, a staff member at Wesleyan university, Emily Huntington Miller, who worked in Northwestern university, and Martha McClellan Brown, from Alliance, Ohio met together at Fairpoint, New York for a national Sunday school assembly. They believed that they could cure society's ills better than men could, and decided to combat liquor trafficking to prove that they could do it better than men. They then created an assembly and a national organization to promote this female work.

== Social cleansing ==
Social cleansing (Spanish: limpieza social) is social group-based killing that consists of the elimination of members of society who are considered undesirable, including, but not limited to, the homeless, criminals, street children, the elderly, the poor, the weak, the sick, the needy and disabled people. This phenomenon is caused by a combination of economic and social factors, but killings are notably present in regions with high levels of poverty and disparities of wealth. Perpetrators are usually of the same community as the victims and they are often motivated by the idea that the victims are a drain on the resources of society. Efforts by national and local governments to stop these killings have been largely ineffective. The government and police forces are often involved in the killings, especially in Africa, Asia, and South America.

=== Political cleansing ===
Political cleansing of a population is the elimination of categories of people in specific areas for political reasons. The means of it may vary and they may include acts of political violence, ethnic cleansing, forced migration, genocide, political repression, purges, population transfers and terrorism (especially state terrorism and state-sponsored terrorism). Political cleansing has been used by many dictatorships.

== See also ==
- Autistic supremacism
- Chauvinism
- Colonialism
- Discrimination
- Ethnocentrism
  - Ethnic conflict
    - Ethnic violence
      - Ethnic cleansing
        - List of ethnic cleansing campaigns
- Eugenics
  - History of eugenics
- Exceptionalism
- Genocide
  - Genocides in history
    - Genocide of indigenous peoples
    - Democide
    - Gendercide
    - List of genocides
- Hate crime
- Hate media
- Hate speech
- Hate studies
- Nativism (politics)
- Oppression
- Persecution
- Rule according to higher law
- Legislative supremacy
- Judicial supremacy
- female supremacy
- Slavery
- Social exclusion
- Xenophobia
