= Valérie Bemeriki =

Rwandan journalist and convicted war criminal

- Born: 1955 (age 70–71); Rutshuru, Belgian Congo (now Democratic Republic of the Congo)
- Occupations: Radio presenter (animatrice), journalist
- Status: Incarcerated in Gikondo Prison (Kigali Central Prison, "1930"), Kigali, Rwanda
- Criminal charges: planning genocide, inciting violence, complicity in several murders (by a local Rwandan Gacaca court in 2009)
- Penalty: Life imprisonment

Valérie Bemeriki (born 1955) is a Rwandan convicted war criminal and radio entertainer. Bemeriki was one of the main animatrices of Radio Télévision Libre des Mille Collines (RTLM), which played a significant role in promoting the genocide against the Tutsi.

== Early life ==
Although born in Rutshuru, Democratic Republic of Congo (then Belgian Congo), Bemeriki's hometown is Giciye commune, Gisenyi préfecture, in Rwanda. Prior to working at RTLM, Bemeriki worked for the ruling MRND party as a propagandist, also writing for the Interahamwe's (MRND's youth wing) publication.

== Role in genocide ==
On April 8, 1994, two days after the assassination of Rwandan president Juvénal Habyarimana, Bemeriki ironically noted on air that opposition members of the previous government "could not be found", while several, such as prime minister Agathe Uwilingiyimana had already been murdered. Based on an encounter at an interview at the offices of RTLM, Roméo Dallaire, the Force Commander of UNAMIR, has described Bemeriki as "very aggressive". On June 28, 1994, over a month after the interview, Bemeriki stated on-air that "Dallaire is the basis of this war".

During the genocide, Bemeriki frequently read out names and addresses of Tutsis alleged to be "RPF accomplices", which led to their murder by Hutu Power paramilitaries such as the Impuzamugambi and Interahamwe. Bemeriki was noted for presenting RTML's genocidal rhetoric through a colloquial type of tongue-in-cheek humor.

Bemeriki was an advocate of machetes as a murder weapon, and instructed viewers to "not kill those cockroaches with a bullet — cut them to pieces with a machete”. Bemeriki was one of the few major women who played a major role in the genocide, along with former Minister for Family Welfare and the Advancement of Women Pauline Nyiramasuhuko and former Minister of Justice Agnès Ntamabyaliro Rutagwera. After Kantano Habimana, Bemeriki was the announcer with the second most airtime, approximately 17% of all RTLM broadcasts. Following the genocide, Bemeriki was named as one its 2,133 "planners, organizers, instigators, supervisors and leaders" in accordance with the Genocide Law of the Republic of Rwanda (1996).

== Later life and imprisonment ==
Bemeriki fled Kigali for her native Zaire in July 1994 and was arrested in Minova, near Bukavu in the (by then renamed) Democratic Republic of the Congo on 13 June 1999 by the Rwandan military.

She was convicted of and pleaded guilty to planning genocide, inciting violence and complicity in several murders and sentenced to life imprisonment by a Gacaca court in 2009. Bemeriki has acknowledged her role in the genocide and begged for forgiveness, but has claimed that she was merely acting under the pressure from her employer.
