= Agathe Habyarimana =

First Lady of Rwanda from 1973 to 1994

First Lady of Rwanda
- In office 5 July 1973 – 6 April 1994
- President: Juvénal Habyarimana
- Preceded by: Vérédiana Kayibanda
- Succeeded by: Serafina Bizimungu

Personal details
- Born: Agathe Kanziga; 21 January 1942 (age 84) Karago, Gisenyi prefecture, Western Province, Ruanda-Urundi
- Spouse: Juvénal Habyarimana (m. 1963; died 1994)

Agathe Kanziga Habyarimana (née Kanziga; born 21 January 1942 in Karago, Gisenyi prefecture, Western Province, Rwanda) is the widow of former President of Rwanda Juvénal Habyarimana and former First Lady of Rwanda from 1973 until 1994. Kanziga is part of both Tutsi and Hutu lineage that long ruled an independent principality until the late nineteenth century. She was arrested by French authorities on 2 March 2010 in France following the visit of French President Nicolas Sarkozy to Rwanda.

She was frequently regarded as one of the powers behind the throne during her husband's 20-year presidency, and her family connections to powerful Hutu politicians are often regarded as having provided necessary political capital for Habyarimana. She was the centre of a powerful clique of northern Hutus called akazu (Kinyarwanda for "little house"), an informal organization of Hutu extremists whose members contributed strongly to the 1994 Rwandan genocide.

On 9 April 1994, immediately following Juvénal Habyarimana's assassination and the beginning of the Rwandan genocide, she was airlifted out of Rwanda by French troops and arrived in Paris 8 days later. In this exodus she was accompanied by thirty other members of the akazu, including Ferdinand Nahimana, director of Radio Télévision Libre des Mille Collines. Upon arrival in Paris, she received a gift of F 230,000 from the French government, from a budget allocated for "urgent assistance for Rwandan refugees". In September 1997, she moved to Libreville, Gabon, at the invitation of Omar Bongo, and then Gbadolite in Zaire. Fearing the threat of the RPF, she went back to Zaire in late 1995 and later settled in Gabon, where she was granted a diplomatic passport under a false name. In response to threats by the RPF, she left Libreville and was smuggled into France where she resides illegally.

Agathe Habyarimana is the sister of Protais Zigiranyirazo. She was denied political asylum in France on 4 January 2007 where she fled in January 2004, but remained in France. She was arrested on 2 March 2010, following French President Nicolas Sarkozy's visit to Rwanda where he admitted to mistakes made by France over the genocide, further stating that France would seek out those responsible for the genocide who were living in France.

In September 2011, a French court denied Rwanda extradition of Habyarimana. A civil suit, perhaps thus weakened, remains.

In August 2021, the Paris Court of Appeal ruled "inadmissible" the request for dismissal of Agathe Habyarimana, suspected of being involved in the genocide committed against the Tutsi in Rwanda in 1994 and targeted by an investigation in France since 2008.

On September 12, 2024, the French National Anti-Terrorism Prosecutor's Office filed an appeal to obtain the indictment of Agathe Habyarimana in the Rwandan Genocide. On May 16, 2025, the Paris judicial court concluded that the prosecution's testimony was "contradictory, inconsistent, and even mendacious" and ordered the investigation closed. However, the decision was challenged by the prosecution, and on 6 May 2026 the Court of Appeals of Paris overturned the lower court's decision and reopened the case against Habyarimana.
