= Radio Muhabura =

Radio station of the Rwandan Patriotic Front based in Uganda

Radio Muhabura was a radio station of RPF (Rwandan Patriotic Front) during the Rwandan Civil War from 1990 to 1994. It was created in 1991 and broadcast from Uganda. It was the first alternative to Radio Rwanda, reaching all but the south of Rwanda by mid-1992. It was recorded by the BBC starting in 1992. It promoted armed resistance to the "extremist" Rwandan government. In an October 1992 broadcast it claimed that militia forces of the government's party had "devised traps aimed at exterminating the youth." As early as January 1993, months before the RTLM went on-air, Radio Muhabura accused the Rwandan government of genocide. It routinely denied RPF involvement in civilian killings, and promoted resistance to "Hutu power", to the Habyarimana government, and desertion by the military.

It regularly discussed the return of the Rwandan diaspora and the creation of a new government.

Although the pro-Hutu RTLM (which became an inciting instrument of the Rwandan genocide of 1994) was extensively listened to, Radio Muhabura had a much smaller audience, probably because it broadcast in English instead of Kinyarwanda.

The existence of Radio Muhabura was cited as a part of the defense in the trial of Ferdinand Nahimana in the International Criminal Tribunal for Rwanda.

== See also ==
- Hate Media
- Mount Muhabura
- Radio Télévision Libre des Mille Collines
