= Minova =

Town in Democratic Republic of the Congo

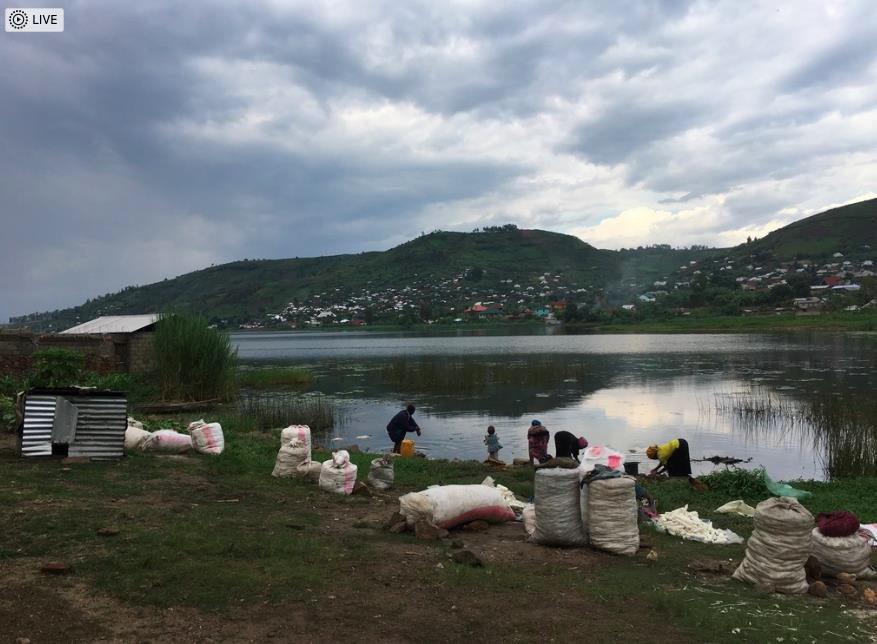

- Location within Democratic Republic of the Congo
- Coordinates: 01°42′25″S 029°01′09″E
- Country: DR Congo
- Province: South Kivu
- Territory: Kalehe
- Chiefdom: Buhavu
- Time zone: UTC+2 (Central Africa Time)

Minova is a town in the Kalehe Territory in the South Kivu province of the Democratic Republic of the Congo. It is an important business center for farm-fishery products. It is close to Idjwi Island, Masisi Territory and Lake Kivu on its North Western shore, and 45 km from the provincial capital city Goma.

The town's development is linked with important refugee-related history, including those from Rwanda in 1994, those from Masisi in 1992–1997, and other surrounding areas in northern South Kivu Province, Democratic Republic of the Congo. It is known for being the site of the systematic rape of refugees by DRC troops. Many local organizations are involved in the management of Gender Based Violence (GBV) working to restore dignity to women and girls who were raped (Panzi Foundation DRC is one of them, and it is very active in the Buzi -Bulenga area).

== History ==
Minova is clearly one point of the Buhavu Chiefdom, headed by the Mwami Ntambuka dynasty, in the Kalehe Territory, South-Kivu Province. But the migrations of refugees and Humanitarians made this place to be developed, added to the recent activity of mining/minerals discovered in the surrounding mountains of Minova (Rubaya Mountains, Numbi Mountains, Nyabibwe Mountains, Kalungu Mountains) where Colombo-Tantalite and other minerals were discovered and extracted recently. Normally people from Minova are Havu, Hunde, Shi, Bahutu and Batembo ethnic groups. They live in a community of farmers, fishermen and small business entrepreneurs. The main products (beans, bananas, pineapple, cassava bread, fish, coffee, minerals, etc) are commercialized with Idjwi Island, Bukavu, Kabare, Walikale, Masisi and Goma inhabitants.There are Also General Hospitals (HGR Minova, CH Bulenga, CH Kalungu, HGR Kirotshe, CH Numbi) in the Minova catchment Area where people can receive quality healthcare services. There are also good schools, primary and secondary, either owned by religious institutions or the DRC Authorities where children receive their education by qualified teachers every year.) .

Since 1994, Minova has grown up from a village to a large town, primarily due to the influx of refugees (from Rwanda in 1994, from Masisi in 1990-1996 and other surrounding areas) and from the fighting associated with the First and the Second Congo wars and subsequent continued fighting in this eastern area. As of 2012 Minova had grown to incorporate the former village of Butando and Buzi-Bulenga to the northwest.

On June 13, 1999, the fugitive Valérie Bemeriki, a genocidaire and former Radio-Télévision Libre des Milles Collines animatrice, was arrested in Minova.

For three days in 2012, troops of the DRC committed systematic rapes and atrocities against refugee women and girls, who had been run out of Goma, then controlled by M23 rebel troops. Among the perpetrators were members of the US Special Forces-trained 391st Commando Battalion. There was international outrage and UN condemnation of these actions against hundreds of Congolese civilians. In 2014 the DRC Army conducted the "Minova Trial", the largest rape tribunal in DRC history, at which numerous women testified. In the end, only junior officers were convicted at the trial. An international summit was held in London in 2014 to work on actions against rape in warfare. However, the women of Minova are still at risk, and many were attacked again as violence in the area continued.

During the latest M23 offensive, in early February 2024, M23 rebels, backed by the Rwandan army, took control of the road linking Minova to Goma and Bukavu, causing the Congolese army to flee to Minova as well as tens of thousands of civilians. Humanitarian aid for the nearly 300,000 displaced people in Minova was reported as almost non-existent.

== Geography ==
Minova is located in north-eastern part of Kalehe Territory at the head of Kabuno Bay, on the western shore of Lake Kivu. Minova is linked to Bukavu by road (165 km) and Lake Kivu, to Goma (about 40 km) by road and Lake Kivu, to Kibuye and Gisenyi by Lake Kivu, and to Masisi by road. The bed rock consists of metamorphic schists and quartzites.

=== Climate ===
In the Köppen-Geiger climate classification system, Minova's climate is tropical, wet, and dry (Aw). It is characterized by a very long rain season and a moderate dry season. This is a mountainous tropical climate and the temperature is under 30 Celsius degrees for the whole year (between 16 and 29 degrees Celsius).

Climate data for Maiduguri
Month	Jan	Feb	Mar	Apr	May	Jun	Jul	Aug	Sep	Oct	Nov	Dec	Year
Mean daily maximum °C (°F)	25 (77)	25 (77)	25.2 (77.4)	24.8 (76.6)	24.7 (76.5)	24.5 (76.1)	24.6 (76.3)	25.3 (77.5)	25.3 (77.5)	25.1 (77.2)	24.7 (76.5)	24.8 (76.6)	24.9 (76.9)
Daily mean °C (°F)	19.4 (66.9)	19.4 (66.9)	19.6 (67.3)	19.4 (66.9)	19.4 (66.9)	18.7 (65.7)	18.6 (65.5)	19.3 (66.7)	19.4 (66.9)	19.4 (66.9)	19.1 (66.4)	19.3 (66.7)	19.3 (66.6)
Mean daily minimum °C (°F)	13.8 (56.8)	13.8 (56.8)	14.1 (57.4)	14.1 (57.4)	14.1 (57.4)	13 (55)	12.6 (54.7)	13.3 (55.9)	13.5 (56.3)	13.7 (56.7)	13.5 (56.3)	13.8 (56.8)	13.6 (56.5)
Average precipitation mm (inches)	117 (4.6)	100 (3.9)	128 (5.0)	156 (6.1)	144 (5.7)	63 (2.5)	35 (1.4)	75 (3.0)	132 (5.2)	160 (6.3)	150 (5.9)	147 (5.8)	1,407 (55.4)
Source: Climate-Data.org (altitude: 1464m)

== Representation in other media ==
The American short documentary The Testimony (2015) chronicles the 2014 Minova Trial with a focus on the testimony provided by women.
