= Félicien Kabuga =

Rwandan businessman and génocidaire (1933–2026)

- Kabuga in 2020
- Born: 1 March 1933; Munig, Mukarange, Byumba, Ruanda-Urundi
- Died: 16 May 2026 (aged 93); The Hague, Netherlands
- Spouse: Josephine Mukazitoni
- Children: 11
- Criminal charges: 11 counts involving genocide (by Rwanda); 5 counts (by ICTR)

Details
- Date apprehended: 16 May 2020
- Imprisoned at: International Residual Mechanism for Criminal Tribunals, The Hague

Félicien Kabuga (1 March 1933 – 16 May 2026) was a Rwandan businessman and génocidaire who played a major role financing the Rwandan genocide. A multimillionaire, he was closely connected to both President Juvénal Habyarimana's Hutu Supremacist party, the MRND, and the Akazu, an informal group of Hutu extremists who helped lead the Rwandan genocide.

Kabuga is noted for his role as the primary financier of Hutu extremist media outlets, such as the RTLM radio station and Kangura magazine, which advocated for the killing of the Tutsi ethnic minority.

In 2020, Kabuga was arrested by the French police in Greater Paris at the age of 87, after spending 26 years as a fugitive. He was held at the IRMCT branch in The Hague to stand trial for crimes against humanity, but was declared unfit to stand trial in 2023 due to dementia. There was no agreement on where he should go, leading to his death in custody in 2026 at the age of 93.

== Early life ==
Félicien Kabuga was born 1 March 1933 in Munig, present-day Gicumbi District. (Note: Kabuga's birth date was previously believed to be 19 July 1935, but he stated the 1 March 1933 date during a 2020 court appearance.) An ethnic Hutu, Kabuga amassed his wealth by owning tea farms in northern Rwanda, as well as other business ventures.

In 1993, at an RTLM fundraising meeting organised by the MRND, Kabuga allegedly publicly defined the purpose of RTLM as the defence of Hutu Power. During the ICTR's so-called "media trial", former RTLM presenter Georges Ruggiu named Kabuga as the "Chairman Director-general" of the station, with duties such as "presiding over RTLM" and "representing RTLM."

From January 1993 to March 1994, a total of 500,000 machetes were imported into Rwanda. Kabuga has been named as one of the main importers of these machetes.

== Indictment by ICTR ==
On 29 August 1998, the prosecutor of the United Nations International Criminal Tribunal for Rwanda, Carla Del Ponte, indicted Kabuga. In the amended indictment dated 1 October 2004, prosecutor Hassan Jallow charged Kabuga with:

- Conspiracy to commit genocide
- Genocide, or alternatively
- Complicity in genocide
- Direct and public incitement to commit genocide
- Extermination as a crime against humanity

== Life as a fugitive ==
Kabuga fled Rwanda in 1994 as it was being conquered by the Rwandan Patriotic Front. He first attempted to enter Switzerland, but was ordered to leave. He went to Kinshasa in the Democratic Republic of the Congo and was later believed to be residing in Nairobi, Kenya.

In September 1995, before any indictment and before he was named as a suspected planner of the genocide, Kabuga registered and ran a business, Nshikabem Agency, in Nairobi.

In 2003, a young Kenyan journalist helping U.S. agents from the Federal Bureau of Investigation track down Kabuga was murdered.

In a speech given on 28 August 2006 during his visit to Kenya, then-U.S. Senator Barack Obama accused Kenya of "allowing [Kabuga] to purchase safe haven." The Kenyan government called the allegation "an insult to the people of this country."

According to June 2008 reports by a Norwegian-based blogger calling himself African Press International (API), Kabuga was in hiding in Oslo, and may have been seeking to turn himself in. Authorities dismissed this claim as a hoax.

The United States State Department offered a reward of US$5 million for information leading to Kabuga's arrest. On 14 June 2008, KTN News Kenya reported that Kabuga had been arrested the day before and was being held at Gigiri Police Station in Nairobi. Later the suspect was found to be a local university lecturer, not Kabuga, and released. It was earlier suspected that Kabuga resided in Kenya and was running businesses and enjoying protection from either the Kenyan government or some influential figures within the country.

== Arrest and court proceedings ==
On 16 May 2020, police arrested Kabuga, aged 87, in Asnières-sur-Seine, near Paris, France, by which time he had spent 26 years as a fugitive. French authorities expressed a desire to see him tried for crimes against humanity committed against the Tutsis of Rwanda. He was arrested by French police as the result of a joint investigation with the IRMCT Office of the Prosecutor, assisted by Interpol and law enforcement agencies in Rwanda, Belgium, and the United States. On 27 May, Kabuga denied the charges and was denied bail.

On 3 June and then on appeal on 30 September 2020, the French justice system approved the handover of Kabuga to the IRMCT. On 26 October 2020, he was transferred from France to the custody of the IRMCT branch in The Hague. He pleaded not guilty.

Kabuga's trial began on 29 September 2022. In March 2023, the trial was suspended to assess claims by his lawyers that he suffered from dementia and was not mentally competent to stand trial. The court announced that it had received an independent medical report regarding Kabuga's mental fitness and would be holding further hearings over the coming weeks. Several psychiatrists subsequently testified that Kabuga suffered from both vascular dementia and Alzheimer's disease and was not fit to stand trial.

On 7 June 2023, the IRMCT ruled Kabuga unfit to stand trial. According to the judges, Kabuga was "no longer capable of meaningful participation in his trial". This was based on his medical records and reports from staff who cared for him. The court suggested the judges adopt an alternative procedure that resembles a trial as closely as possible but without the possibility of a conviction.

== Death ==
Kabuga remained in detention until his death, despite the court ordering his release. Only Rwanda offered to take him in, and Kabuga rejected repatriation to Rwanda on the grounds of it being unsafe for him to return. He died while under detention in The Hague on 16 May 2026, at the age of 93.

== Personal life ==
Kabuga was married to Josephine Mukazitoni, and had 11 children. Two of his daughters are married to two of Juvénal Habyarimana's sons.
