= MK Isacco =

Rwandan singer and songwriter

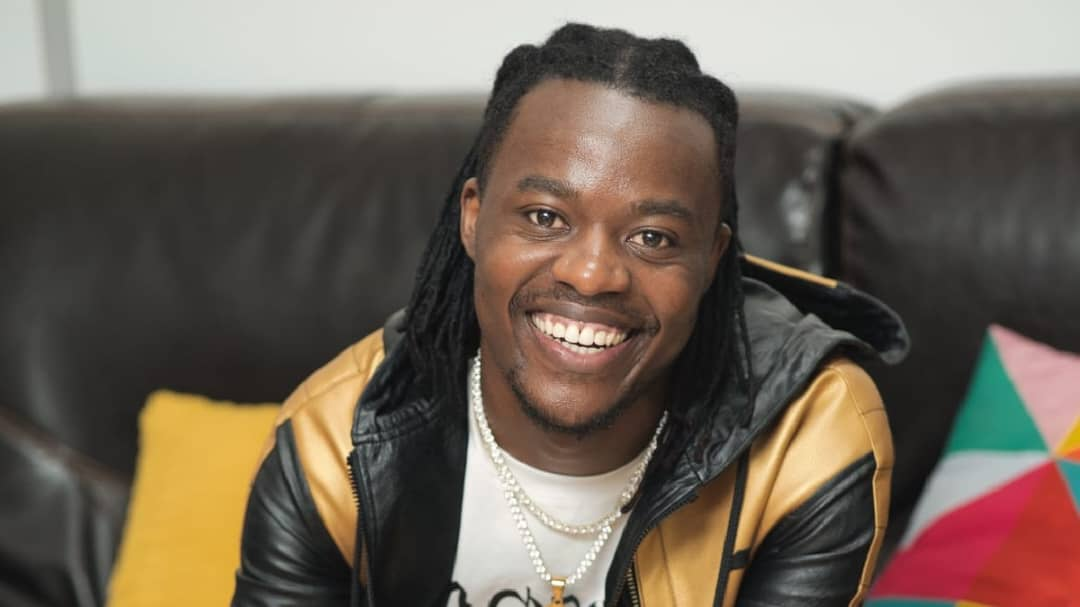

Background information
- Also known as: King of the Stage; Isacco
- Born: Isaac Murwanashyaka Nzabonimana; January 19, 1991 (age 35)
- Origin: Rwanda
- Genres: Afropop; Afrobeat; Afro dancehall; R&B
- Occupations: Singer; Songwriter; Music Producer; Logistics Manager
- Years active: 2012–present
- Label: Isacco Production
- Publisher: Isacco Production

Isaac Murwanashyaka Nzabonimana (born January 19, 1991 in Rwanda), commonly known by his stage name MK Isacco is a French-Rwandan singer, and songwriter.

== Early life and education ==
MK Isacco was born in Rwanda and grew up primarily in Kenya. He is the youngest of three brothers born to Béata and Callixte Nzabonimana.

During his childhood in Kenya, he developed an early passion for music. He later moved to France to pursue studies in logistics while developing his music career.

MK Isacco was separated from his parents at an early age due to the instability and difficult circumstances affecting his home country at the time. From the age of three, he was raised by his two older brothers in the absence of his parents.

Although he grew up without parental affection, he received a strong and caring upbringing from his brothers, whom he considers his true parents. In a televised interview, he stated: “I am who I am today because of them.”

He reunited with his biological parents at the age of 21, an experience he described as unforgettable.

Throughout his childhood, several members of the community – family friends and acquaintances – contributed to his care and well-being, despite not being directly related and expecting nothing in return. This selfless support left a deep impression on MK Isacco and shaped his strong sense of compassion and solidarity. He often says that his commitment to helping others stems from this personal experience: “When you do good around you, one day it comes back to you — either to you or to your family.”

== Music career ==
Known professionally as MK Isacco and nicknamed the King of the Stage for his energetic performances and charismatic presence.

MK Isacco began his music journey in Kenya, where he was introduced to recording studios by his cousin, Rukuz, a music producer.He recorded his first single, ''Maisha Ni Mpango'' ("Life is a Project"), which received airplay on Kenyan radio stations and earned him the opportunity to perform as an opening act at local concerts.

Although he did not initially consider music as a professional career, MK Isacco remained involved in the scene after moving to France. There, he joined a circle of musician friends and co-founded the group '''IC-KS'''. After several years, as the band members pursued other professional paths, he decided to embark on a solo career.

In 2017, MK Isacco released his debut solo single, NONAHA ("Now"), which was met with immediate success and marked the beginning of his solo musical journey. Since then, he has been recognized for his authentic vocal style, vibrant energy, and powerful stage presence.

He released several other singles, including:

Cheza (2018)

Uko Ubikora (2020)

Urampagije (2020)

Malayika (2021)

Inchallah (2021).

In 2020, he founded his own label, ISACCO Production, and released the single zunguza featuring Guinean artist Lil Sako.

His debut album, On s’amuse, was released in September 2021 and contains eight tracks. A second album is planned for late 2025, with several collaborations with Kenyan artists.

His work continues to receive media attention in Rwanda and Kenya, affirming his place in the African diaspora music scene.

== Performances ==
That same year, MK Isacco performed on numerous prestigious stages, alongside renowned artists:

Frankfurt – Shared the stage with Dadju

Élysée Montmartre (Paris) – Performance with Serge Beynaud

Dock Pullman – Performed with DJ Arafat, Bramsito, Passi, and Djibril Cissé, the former French international footballer turned DJ

Dock Eiffel – Participated in Soum Bill's 25th career anniversary concert

Foire de Paris – Performed with various Trace Africa artists

Zénith de Paris – Shared the stage with Mariam Ba

Les Pyramides (Port-Marly) – Performed with Ya Levis Dalwear and Samy Diko

Le Bataclan – On stage with Djanii Alfa and Lil Saako

== Awards ==
2016 – Best Male Artist in the Diaspora, Nshuti Awards

2017 – Best African Artist in the Diaspora

2022 – Best Diaspora Artist

2023 – Best African Artist in the Diaspora, Kara Production

== Humanitarian work ==
MK Isacco is notably committed to supporting vulnerable individuals, particularly the elderly and people with disabilities. He has expressed that he feels truly useful when spending time with them, listening, and sharing moments of human connection.

Since 2013, MK Isacco has volunteered annually at the Diocesan Pilgrimage of Oise to Lourdes, serving as a hospital caregiver for elderly and disabled pilgrims. He regards this experience as a meaningful source of both personal growth and artistic inspiration.

His approach is rooted in altruism: he provides assistance without expectation of return, offers his time unconditionally, and believes that performing good deeds without ulterior motives is a fundamental source of personal fulfillment. According to him, acts of kindness carried out today may have a lasting impact—either in his own life or in the lives of others.

This humanistic philosophy strongly informs his worldview and continues to influence his social commitments and creative work.

== Professional career ==
MK Isacco holds a degree and specialization in logistics. He has worked for several international companies, including:

1.BMW GROUP : Parts Advisor & Warehouse Specialist (Automotive Spare Parts)

2.NESTLÉ PURINA : Logistics Operator (Pet Food Manufacturing)

3.CURIEUX E-LIQUIDES : Deputy Logistics Manager (E-cigarette Wholesale)

4.SODEXO : Logistics Technician (Event Logistics – Paris 2024 Olympic and Paralympic Games)

5.GREENTECH : Warehouse Manager (E-cigarette B2C E-commerce)

6.FM LOGISTIC : Logistics Operations Manager (E-commerce – IKEA Account)

7.METRO France : Logistics Manager (Wholesale / B2B Distribution)

== Discography ==
=== Albums ===
On s’amuse (2021)

Second album (expected late 2025)

=== Selected singles ===
Nonaha (2017)

Cheza (2018)

Uko Ubikora (2020)

Urampagije (2020)

Malayika (2021)

Inchallah (2021)

Zunguza feat. Lil Sako (2021)
