= Solange Tetero =

Rwandan politician

Solange Tetero is a Rwandan politician who currently serves as General Director of Youth Empowerment in Rwanda Minister of Youth and Culture since 2020. From 2015 to 2020 she has been working for the Imbuto Foundation. She was awarded two times by the First Lady of Rwanda in Best Performing Girls in country (BPGs) in 2009 and 2011.

== Education ==
Tetero has a master's degree in public health from Suffolk University in the United Kingdom and holds a bachelor's degree in soil and environment management from the University of Rwanda. She holds certificates in farmer-led agricultural extension and agriculture digitalization from Japan and the Netherlands.
