= Callixte Nzabonimana =

Rwandan politician

Callixte Nzabonimana (born 1953) is a Rwandan former politician who participated in the Rwandan genocide. He was convicted of genocide and crimes against humanity by the International Criminal Tribunal for Rwanda and sentenced to life in prison.

== Prior to 1994 ==
An ethnic Hutu from Gitarama prefecture, Nzabonimana held the position of Minister of Planning in the MRND government of Juvénal Habyarimana from 15 January 1989 to 4 February 1991, in the successive "multi-party" government formed on 31 December 1991, and the second "multi-party" government formed on 16 April 1992. As of 1994, he was also MRND president for Gitarama prefecture.

The ICTR indictment against musician Simon Bikindi charges that Bikindi, an author of many racially charged anti-Tutsi songs, “consulted with President Juvénal Habyarimana, Minister of Youth and Sports Callixte Nzabonimana and MRND-aligned military authorities on song lyrics” before releasing them to be played on the Hutu Power radio station RTLM.

== During the genocide ==
After the death of Habyarimana on 6 April 1994, Nzabonimana was appointed Minister of Youth and Sports (Ministre du Sport et de la Jeunesse) in the interim government. Between 9 April and 14 July, he is alleged to have met with fellow ministers at a number of Government meetings in which ministers received briefings on the genocide's progress, and requested weapons to distribute in their home provinces for use by the genocidaires.

== Trial and sentencing ==
On 21 November 2001, the International Criminal Tribunal for Rwanda (ICTR) released an indictment charging Nzabonimana and others with genocide, conspiracy to commit genocide, complicity in genocide, direct and public incitement to commit genocide, and crimes against humanity. Rewards for Justice offered up to $5 million USD for information leading to his arrest.

Nzabonimana was detained in Tanzania on 18 February 2008 and transferred to custody of the ICTR on 19 February 2008.

In 2005, African Rights reported that Nzabonimana was one of "three key civilians" collaborating with the FLDR, operating out of the Democratic Republic of the Congo.

In 2012, he was sentenced to life in prison for genocide, crimes against humanity, and failing to act against or denounce Interahamwe atrocities. The court found that in April 1994, he conspired with other government ministers to encourage the killings of Tutsis living in Gitarama. He was also found to have incited violence against Tutsis with his speeches. He appealed his sentence, but his appeal was rejected in 2014. At the time, he was being held at the International Criminal Tribunal for Rwanda until a country agreed to take him into custody.
