= Protais Zigiranyirazo =

Rwandan businessman and politician (1938–2025)

- Born: 2 February 1938; Giciye commune, Ruanda-Urundi
- Died: 3 August 2025 (aged 87); Niamey, Niger
- Other name: Mr Z
- Education: Université du Québec à Montréal
- Occupation: Politician
- Relatives: Agathe Habyarimana (sister)

Protais Zigiranyirazo (2 February 1938 – 3 August 2025), commonly known as Monsieur Zed or Mr. Z, was a Rwandan businessman and politician who was governor of the Ruhengeri prefecture in northwestern Rwanda from 1974 to 1989. Zigiranyirazo was a member of the Akazu, an elite circle of relatives and friends of former President Juvénal Habyarimana who pushed the Hutu Power ideology. Accused of war crimes during the Rwandan genocide of 1994, he was ultimately acquitted by the International Criminal Tribunal for Rwanda, after spending six years in prison.

== Early life and career ==
An ethnic Hutu, Zigiranyirazo was the brother of Agathe Kanziga and brother-in-law of President Juvénal Habyarimana, who came to power in Rwanda in the Coup d'état of 5 July 1973. He was well-connected to the Hutu establishment of politicians, businessmen, and military officers which thereafter controlled the country.

In 1974, Habyarimana appointed Zigiranyirazo as governor of Ruhengeri, a position he kept for fifteen years. During that time, Zigiranyirazo wielded extraordinary power and was nicknamed "Monsieur Zed" and "le prince du nord" (prince of the north).

In 1989, Zigiranyirazo resigned his position as a governor to become a student at the Université du Québec à Montréal (UQAM) in Montreal, Quebec, Canada. He has since claimed that he abandoned all political activities in 1989.

In Montreal in 1993, Zigiranyirazo was convicted of uttering death threats against two Tutsi refugees, who "accused him of participating in the planning of ethnic massacres." He was then expelled from UQAM and from Canada.

Following his expulsion from Canada, Zigiranyirazo returned to Rwanda. The assassination of his brother-in-law Habyarimana on 6 April 1994 precipitated the events leading to the Rwandan genocide. From some time after 1994 until July 2001, Zigiranyirazo resided in Nairobi, Kenya.

== Genocide allegations ==
The Office of the Prosecutor of the International Criminal Tribunal for Rwanda (ICTR) accused Zigiranyirazo of committing crimes during the months of the genocide in 1994, alleging that he "ordered or authorized roadblocks to be established in direct proximity to each of his three residences ... knowing and intending that they would be used in the campaign of extermination and killing. Protais Zigiranyirazo further instructed men at the roadblock to kill all Tutsi that attempted to pass through. Shortly thereafter, and on a continuing basis, soldiers and Interahamwe killed a number of people in their homes and killed people identified as Tutsi that attempted to pass through the roadblock."

== Arrest and court appearances ==
On 9 June 2001, Zigiranyirazo arrived in Belgium, travelling under a false identity, and sought asylum. While staying at a refugee centre, he was identified by an anonymous informant. On 21 July 2001, he was arrested, at the request of Carla Del Ponte, chief prosecutor of ICTR. On 4 October 2001, the Belgian government handed him over to ICTR.

On his initial appearance before the court in October 2001, he was charged with two counts of crimes against humanity. The indictment against him was, however, amended pending his second appearance on 25 November 2003. The amended indictment accused him of committing genocide against Tutsis between April and July 1994 in Kigali and Gisenyi. Proceedings continued for some five years, with Zigiranyirazo held on remand. On 18 December 2008, Trial Chamber III, composed of Judges Inés Mónica Weinberg de Roca of Argentina, Khalida Rashid Khan of Pakistan, and Lee Gacuiga Muthoga of Kenya, convicted Zigiranyirazo of genocide and extermination as crimes against humanity and sentenced him to twenty years imprisonment. Credit was given to him for the time he had spent in prison awaiting trial.

On 16 November 2009, the conviction was overturned by the Appeal Chamber of the ICTR, which acquitted Zigiranyirazo on all charges, finding that the court had made serious errors in its initial judgement, and ordering his immediate release. Zigiranyirazo’s withdrawal from political life in 1989 also influenced the acquittal decision. The Appeal Chamber explicitly found that there had been a miscarriage of justice.

== Death ==
Zigiranyirazo died on 3 August 2025 at his residence in Niamey, Niger, where he had been living since his acquittal. He was 87.

His family hoped to have him buried in Orléans, France, but a trial on 26 August, appealed on 28 August, forbid this burial, arguing of risks to interior security. A new burial place is still to be decided.
