= Kantano Habimana =

Rwandan journalist

- Born: 20th century
- Died: circa. 1998–2002; Democratic Republic of Congo
- Known for: Broadcasting hate propaganda on Radio Télévision Libre des Mille Collines before and during the Rwandan genocide

Kantano Habimana (died c. 1998–2002), commonly referred to as Kantano, was a presenter (animateur) on the Rwandan radio station RTLM, which played a significant role in promoting the genocide against the Tutsi. Like the station's other broadcasters, Habimana incited violence against Tutsi and moderate Hutu on the air.

The most popular RTML animateur in terms of airtime, his appeal was attributed to his "loose and comical style on the air". During his time on air, he was noted for his charisma and sense of humor, and he was noted for being able to speak profusely "as if people were right in front of him, which was good for getting their attention.

== Early life ==
Habimana's birth date and most details about his early life prior to joining the RTLM are unknown. What is known is that he received a master's degree while studying journalism in Leningrad (now Saint Petersburg) in the Soviet Union and subsequently worked at Rwandan newspapers Imvaho and Umurwanashyaka.

== Biography ==
Habimana is often named as both the most popular animateur of RTLM and the animateur with by far the most airtime, with his segments having accounted for approximately 33% of the station’s broadcast content. Indeed, in one anthropological study conducted through on-the-ground research in Rwanda, both Hutus and Tutsis interviewed noted he was famous for his strong oratory skills.

Prior to the genocide, Habimana took a more moderate line on racial issues than most adherents of Hutu Power. In December 1993, for example, Habimana stated the following while on air:

"Not all Tutsis are wicked; some of them are wicked. Not all Hutus are good, some of them are wicked. Of the ethnic groups, there are some wicked... This shows that human nature remains the same among all the ethnic groups in Rwanda, among all the men in Rwanda. But what type of person got it into his head that the RTLM hates the Tutsis?"

However, during the genocide, Habimana routinely announced exact whereabouts, names and license plate numbers of alleged RPF accomplices, inciting targeted violence and often murder on the named individuals by groups such as the Impuzamugambi and Interahamwe militias. Habimana gave advice to listeners on how to identify Tutsis, saying that an individual's height and physical appearance can determine if they're Tutsi. Habimana instructed listeners to "[l]ook at the person's height and his physical appearance... Just look at his small nose and then break it”.

== Life post-genocide and reported death ==
At a pre-genocide court hearing on March 15, 1994, for "the incitement of citizens against each other", Habimana would claim that RTLM broadcasters were "small fish" compared to RTLM executives such as Ferdinand Nahimana, and thus bore little responsibility for the genocide.

Habimana reportedly died of AIDS in the Democratic Republic of Congo sometime between 1998 and 2002.
