= Akazu =

Hutu Power genocidaire network

The Akazu (Kinyarwanda: [ɑ.kɑ.zu], little house) was an informal organization of elite Hutu extremists whose members contributed strongly to the 1994 genocide in Rwanda. A circle of relatives and close friends of Rwanda's then-president Juvénal Habyarimana and his influential wife Agathe Habyarimana, they were also called the Zero Network, for their goal of a Rwanda with zero Tutsi.

== Background ==
The Akazu were relatives of Habyarimana's and others he knew from his Northern Rwanda district; they held important appointed positions of authority in the Hutu regime. The Akazu did not wish to share government with the Tutsis (particularly the expatriate rebels resident in Uganda) or moderate Hutu. They contributed to the development of Hutu Power ideology and fanned resentment against the Tutsi during the 1990s. Some scholars believe their genocidal ideology and massacres were an effort to hold on to the political power they had gathered since Habyarimana came to power in a military coup against the elected government.

== Known members ==
- Protais Zigiranyirazo, former governor of the Ruhengeri prefecture
- Seraphin Rwabukumba, brother-in-law of President Habyarimana
- FAR Colonel Elie Sagatwa
- FAR Colonel Théoneste Bagosora
- FAR Colonel Laurent Serubuga
- Félicien Kabuga, businessman who was the primary financier of the RTLM radio station and Kangura magazine
- Agathe Kanziga, First Lady of Rwanda
- Séraphin Bararengana, head of the Department of Medicine at the University of Rwanda; brother of President Habyarimana
- Charles Nzabagerageza, businessman and shareholder in RTLM radio
- Alphonse Ntirivamunda, son-in-law of President Habyarimana
- Joseph Nzirorera, former speaker of the National Development Council and Minister of Industry, Mines and Handcraft
- Noel Mbonabaryi, uncle of President Habyarimana
- Pauline Nyiramasuhuko, Minister for Family Welfare and the Advancement of Women in Habyarimana's government from 1992
