= Eliézer Niyitegeka =

Rwandan journalist (1952–2018)

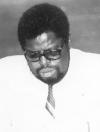
- Born: 12 March 1952; Kibuye, Rwanda-Urundi
- Died: 28 March 2018 (age 66); Mali
- Political party: Republican Democratic Movement
- Conviction: Crime against humanity
- Penalty: Life imprisonment

Details
- Imprisoned at: Mali

Eliézer Niyitegeka (born 12 March 1952 in Kibuye prefecture, Rwanda – 28 March 2018) was a journalist, former politician, and high level participant in the 1994 Rwandan genocide. After studying journalism in Romania, Niyitegeka became first a journalist and presenter with Radio Rwanda and subsequently a Member of Parliament, then executive in a textile company and businessman. In 1991, with the coming of multi party democracy to Rwanda, he was one of the founding members of the opposition party, the Republican Democratic Movement (MDR). MDR advocated democracy, individual freedoms, the reunion of Rwandans regardless of ethnic considerations, and the end of violence. Its motto, as shown in the party's statute, was: "Liberty, Justice and Work. From 1991 till 1994, he was President of the MDR in Kibuye prefecture. Niyitegeka also held a seat in the national political headquarters of his party.

Niyitegeka was the object of attacks because of his opinions and his position within the MDR. In March 1992, grenades were thrown at him at Gitega, as he was passing in his vehicle. After the signing of the Arusha power-sharing protocols, in January 1993, Niyitegeka's garage and petrol station in Nyabugogo, Gatsyata, were pillaged during protests organised by the MRND. In the second half of 1993, Niyitegeka was assaulted after chairing a political rally in Kibuye, when passing through Birambo.

On 9 April 1994, he was appointed Minister of Information. He held this position until the time he fled Rwanda in mid-July 1994. In this capacity, he was responsible for government policies adopted in the information sector. He exercised authority and control over all the institutions and staff members under his ministry. He also participated in the drafting of the legislation passed by the Interim Government.

Throughout his time as the Minister of Information, Niyitegeka committed numerous atrocities and was an active participator and leader in the Rwandan genocide until fleeing the country in July 1994. He was finally arrested for his crimes in Nairobi, Kenya on February 9, 1999 and sent to the United Nations prison quarters in Arusha, Tanzania to await trial.

On 16 May 2003, the First Trial Chamber of the ICTR handed down its judgement and found Eliezer Niyitegeka -by a unanimous verdict- guilty of: “genocide” (1st count), of “conspiracy to commit genocide” (3rd count), of “direct and public incitation to commit genocide” (4th count) of “murder as a crime against humanity” (5th count), of “extermination as a crime against humanity” (6th count) and of “other inhumane acts as a crime against humanity” (8th count). Niyitegeka was found not guilty of “complicity in genocide” (2nd count) and not guilty of “rape as a crime against humanity” (7th count).

Niyitegeka was sentenced to life imprisonment, the maximum penalty provided for by the ICTR. He appealed his verdict, but on 9 July 2004, the Appeals Chamber confirmed, in its entirety, the verdict and the sentence imposed on Niyitegeka by the First Trial Chamber.

On 7 December 2008, he was transferred to Mali, where he died on 28 March 2018.
