= Noël Hitimana =

Rwandan propagandist

Noël (Noheli) Hitimana
- Born: c. 1955; Nyamirambo, Rwanda
- Died: 2002; Rwanda (in prison)
- Occupations: Radio presenter (animateur), journalist

Noël (Noheli) Hitimana (born Nyamirambo) was a presenter (animateur) on the Rwandan radio station Radio Télévision Libre des Mille Collines (RTLM), which played a significant role in promoting the genocide against the Tutsi. Like the station's other broadcasters, Hitimana incited violence against the Tutsi on the air.

Prior to his employment at RTLM, Hitimana worked for state-owned Radio Rwanda and the Rwanda Bureau of Information and Broadcasting from the late 1970s until the early 1990s. During that time, he became popular by routinely greeting the different regions and towns of Rwanda in the early morning, while farmers were waking to work in the fields. This broadcast segment emphasized both the importance of hard work, community and the nationalistic views of the ruling National Republican Movement for Democracy and Development (MRND). Allegedly a drunk, Hitimana was fired from Radio Rwanda after insulting Rwandan President Juvénal Habyarimana on-air while intoxicated.

Due to his popularity throughout the country, Hitimana was one of the first animateurs hired by RTLM after its founding on 8 April 1993. He continued his trademark practice of greeting towns and individuals. Once the Genocide against the Tutsi began on 7 April 1994, Hitimana modified this habit into naming exact locations and names of alleged RPF accomplices, inciting targeted violence and often murder on the named individuals by groups such as the Impuzamugambi and Interahamwe militias.

Segments by Hitimana made up about 5% of all RTLM broadcasts.

The studio of RTLM was hit by a bomb on 17 April 1994, with Hitimana being seriously injured. Following the attack, his leg was amputated, resulting in Hitimana leaving RTLM. Hitimana was interviewed by Yolande Mukagasana for her book The Wounds of Silence

Hitimana allegedly died in a Rwandan prison in 2002 due to disease.
