= Robert Kajuga =

Robert Kajuga may refer to:

- Robert Kajuga (Interahamwe) (1960–?), national president of the Hutu extremist militia, the Interahamwe
- Robert Kajuga (athlete) (born 1985), Rwandan athlete
