= Georges Ruggiu =

Belgian journalist and convicted war criminal

- Born: Georges Henri Yvon Joseph Ruggiu; 12 October 1957 (age 69); Verviers, Belgium
- Other name: "Omar" (after conversion to Islam)
- Occupations: Radio presenter (animateur), journalist
- Status: Released
- Conviction: Incitement to genocide
- Penalty: 12 years imprisonment (July 23, 1997 - April 21, 2009)

Georges Henri Yvon Joseph Ruggiu (born 12 October 1957) is a Belgian radio presenter who worked for Rwandan radio station Radio Télévision Libre des Mille Collines, which played a significant role in promoting the genocide against the Tutsi. Like the station's other broadcasters, Ruggiu incited violence against Tutsi and moderate Hutu over the air. He had become involved in Rwandan politics just two years before the genocide.

Commonly referred to as "the Muzuungu" ("white man"), Ruggiu did not speak Kinyarwanda and his segments were tailored to appeal to educated French speakers in the political and military leadership classes, not the general public. Per one study, Ruggiu would "leverage his Europeanness for credibility" during his broadcasts, and played classical music and recited Niccolò Machiavelli quotes on air.

Ruggiu eventually pleaded guilty to charges of incitement to commit genocide and in 2000 was sentenced to 12 years in prison by the International Criminal Tribunal for Rwanda. Ruggiu was the only non-Rwandan charged with involvement in the genocide. He was released from prison in 2009.

== Life in Belgium ==
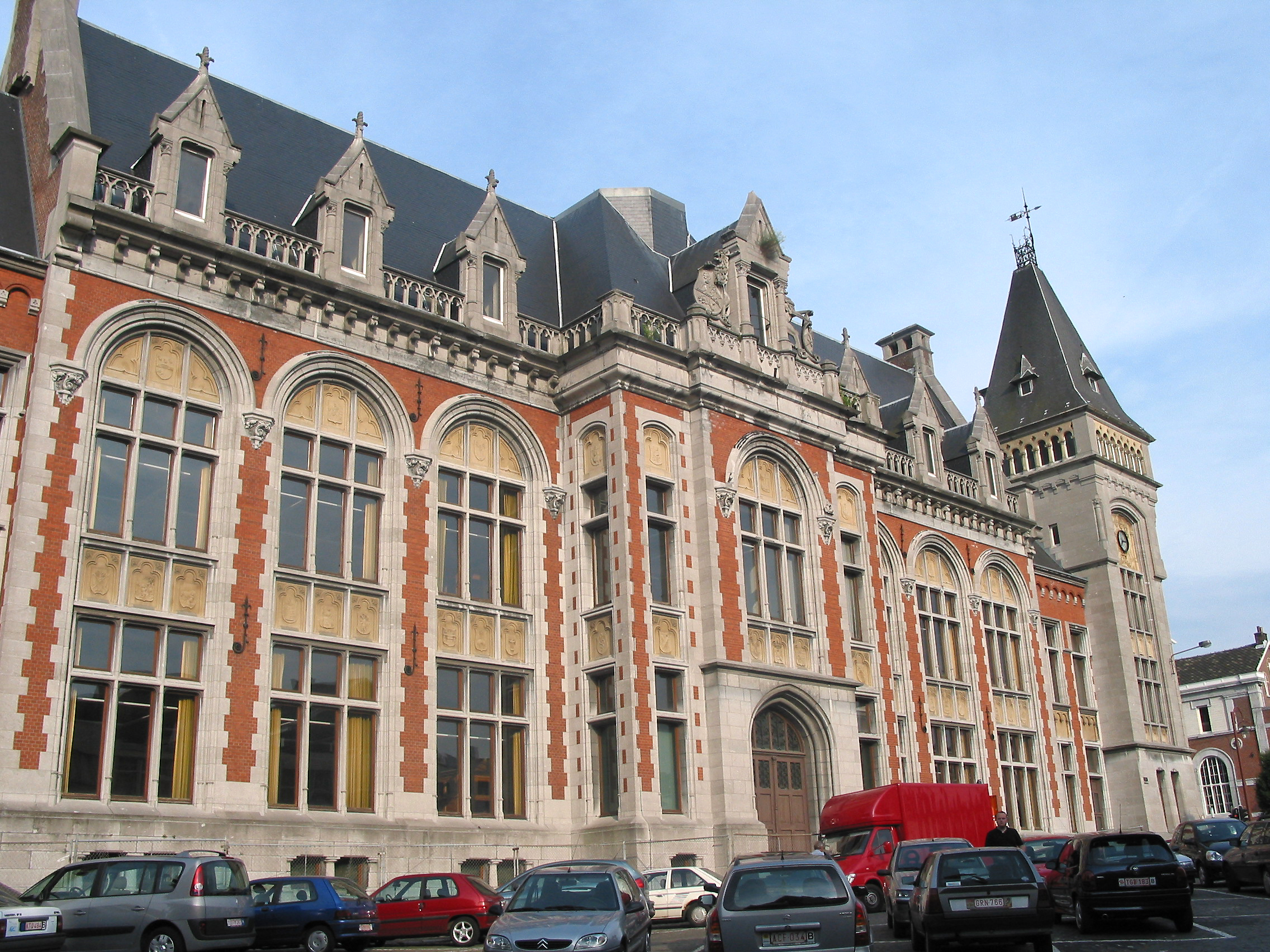
Courthouse in Ruggiu's hometown of Verviers, Belgium.

Ruggiu was born on 12 October 1957 in Verviers, Belgium. Ruggiu's mother was a Belgian teacher, his father an Italian fireman. Until the age of 35 he lived at home and worked in Verviers, first as "a counsellor for young drug addicts and then as a teacher for mentally handicapped children". In 1992 he moved to the city of Liège, commuting to Brussels to work in a social security office. In Liège he "befriended a Rwandan Hutu, was drawn into the Rwandan expatriate community and was soon seen in the company of Rwandan diplomats and officials of President Juvénal Habyarimana's party, the MRND". He began visiting Rwanda, and moved there in 1993.

== Participation in genocide ==
From January to July 1994, prior to and during the genocide, Ruggiu worked in Kigali, Rwanda, as a journalist and producer for Radio Télévision Libre des Mille Collines (RTLM). Ruggiu had no experience in journalism and did not speak Kinyarwanda, the indigenous language of Rwanda. RTLM was one of the chief sources of extremist Hutu propaganda, broadcasting twenty-four hours a day and openly exhorting its audience to kill Tutsis and "disloyal" Hutus.

Ruggiu personally wrote and broadcast much content of this nature, relentlessly egging on his listeners that the "graves were waiting to be filled". While at the RTLM, Ruggiu incited Hutus to commit murder or serious attacks against Tutsi rebels, whom he called "cockroaches". Additionally, he and other RTLM broadcasters encouraged the killings of Tutsi civilians, moderate Hutus (i.e. those who opposed the extremist Hutu Power ideology), as well as fellow Belgian nationals; Belgium had previously colonized Rwanda. Airtime filled by Ruggiu accounted for approximately 8% of RTLM's broadcasts.

Although some of his defenders have suggested that Ruggiu did not know exactly what was going on around him in Rwanda, this opinion is sharply disputed by Rwandan Genocide scholar Alison Des Forges: "It is beyond belief that Ruggiu did not know [what was going on] ... The tone of Mille Collines became more and more violent and witnesses say Ruggiu was living at the army barracks in Kigali and eating in the mess. He was hanging out with those that did the killing."

== Capture, trial, and sentencing ==
After the genocide Ruggiu fled to refugee camps in Zaire and Tanzania and then to Kenya, where he converted to Islam and adopted the name Omar. He "joined a Somali community in Mombasa" and was "on the verge of fleeing to Iraq" when he was arrested by Kenyan police officers in 1997.

On 23 July 1997, Ruggiu was arrested in Mombasa at the request of the prosecutor of the International Criminal Tribunal for Rwanda, and moved to the site of the tribunal in Arusha, Tanzania. Ruggiu was charged with "direct and public incitement to commit genocide" and "crimes against humanity (persecution)". During his three-year-long trial, Ruggiu expressed regret for his part in events, saying, "I admit that it was indeed a genocide and that unfortunately I took part in it." Ruggiu acknowledged his role in the genocide, admitting that he:

... incited murders and caused serious attacks on the physical and/or mental well-being of members of the Tutsi population with the intention of destroying, in whole or in part, an ethnic or racial group.

He accepted responsibility for his actions, stating "certain people were killed in Rwanda in 1994 and that I was responsible and culpable". Ruggiu detailed the inner workings of Radio Télévision Libre des Mille Collines, stating the radio station was used to convey "the ideology and plans of Hutu extremists in Rwanda".

On 15 May 2000, Ruggiu pleaded guilty to both charges of indictment, and was sentenced to twelve years in prison by the International Criminal Tribunal for Rwanda for incitement to commit genocide. He received a relatively short sentence, after agreeing to testify against three suspects who allegedly used the media, most notably RTLM, to fuel the genocide in Rwanda. Rwanda protested the sentence as inadequate.

In February 2008, Ruggiu was flown to Italy to serve out the rest of his 12-year sentence in his country of citizenship. On 21 April 2009, Ruggiu was granted early release by the Italian authorities, a violation of the ICTR Statute.

== Analysis ==
Ruggiu's odd trajectory as a Belgian man who lived at home until the age of 36 becoming a genocide instigator in Rwanda has been the study of many academic inquiries. One study published in the Journal of Genocide Research determined that the appeal of "the muzuungu" ("white man"), who, in contrast to most Rwandans, did not speak Kinyarwanda and only spoke in French on air, was limited to the political and military elite.

Noting that "[Ruggiu's] monologues seem[ed] to serve little purpose other than to leverage his Europeanness for credibility", Ruggiu appealed to educated Rwandans' internalized notions of European superiority. Ruggiu's segments were interspersed with European cultural motifs, including classical European music and recitations of the words of Niccolò Machiavelli, in an attempt to connect European political theory with the genocide.

"Those who understood French liked to listen to the muzuungu [white man] and said he was on the side of the Hutu, and that he spoke well and was against the Tutsi. Educated people and bourgmestres would explain the French broadcasts to others" - accused war criminal "Immaculée"
