= United Nations Detention Facility =

Prison in Tanzania

- Interactive map of United Nations Detention Facility
- Location: Arusha, Tanzania; 3.3058167°S 36.583944°E
- Status: Operational
- Capacity: 56
- Opened: 1995
- Managed by: International Residual Mechanism for Criminal Tribunals

The United Nations Detention Facility (UNDF) is a United Nations detention center located in Arusha in Northern Tanzania. The other one is the United Nations Detention Unit in The Hague, Netherlands. The facility is maintained by the International Residual Mechanism for Criminal Tribunals (IRMCT), a UN organization.

== The Rwanda Tribunal ==
The UNDF served as the detention center for the International Criminal Tribunal for Rwanda (ICTR) until its closure in 2015. Established in the wake of the 1994 Rwandan genocide, the UNDF is an 89-cell institution located within a high security prison compound five miles outside the city of Arusha.

It was exclusively mandated to hold individuals indicted for, or suspected of, having committed war crimes by the International Criminal Tribunal for Rwanda (ICTR) or the IRMCT.

At its height, 51 people brought from more than 15 countries were confined there. They included the former Rwandan Army Chief of Staff Augustin Bizimungu, the pop singer Simon Bikindi, along with former Minister of Defense Théoneste Bagosora.

The welfare of the inmates is monitored by the International Committee of the Red Cross (ICRC).

== See also ==
- United Nations Detention Unit (Netherlands)
