= Jean-Baptiste Gatete =

Rwandan politician

Jean-Baptiste Gatete (born 1953) is a Rwandan politician, convicted of conspiracy to commit genocide, genocide and extermination in the 1994 Rwandan genocide.

Gatete was originally sentenced after trial to a term of life imprisonment but the appeal court reduced the term to 40 years, reasoning "...the Appeals Chamber finds that a term of life imprisonment is the appropriate sentence for Gatete in view of all the convictions..." but "...Gatete’s right to be tried without undue delay was violated..." and as "...any violation of a person’s rights entails the provision of an effective remedy..." therefore "It is satisfied that a term of years, being by its nature a reduced sentence from that of life imprisonment, is the appropriate remedy for the violation of Gatete’s rights."

Gatete was born in the commune of Murambi in the prefecture of Byumba, Rwanda. He was educated as an agricultural engineer, and served as mayor (bourgmestre) of Murambi from 1987 to 1993. An ethnic Hutu, he was a prominent member of the dominant MRND party.

In 1993 he ceased his mayoral duties, but retained influence and exerted "cruelty" over the area. He was convicted of planning and directly participating in genocide between 6 April and 30 April 1994, particularly in the parish of Kiziguro.

He resided in a United Nations High Commissioner for Refugee (UNHCR) camp in Loukolela, northern Republic of Congo from 1997 to at least 1999, where he lived under the alias "Jean Nsengiyumva", and where he raised an apparently adopted boy.

Gatete was arrested on 11 September 2002 in the Republic of Congo. Two days later, he was transferred to the headquarters of the International Criminal Tribunal for Rwanda in Arusha, Tanzania. The original charges included genocide, complicity in genocide and conspiracy to commit genocide and crimes against humanity of extermination, murder and rape. On March 29, 2011, Gatete was convicted and sentenced to life in prison by the International Criminal Tribunal for Rwanda. On October 9, 2012 Gatete's sentence was reduced to 40 years.
