= Autistic supremacism =

Belief autistic people possess superior traits

Autistic supremacism and Aspie supremacism (in reference to Asperger syndrome) are supremacist beliefs that some kinds of autistic people possess superior traits compared to neurotypical individuals. The term was coined in 2010 by Mel Baggs in a blog post titled "Aspie Supremacy can kill." The term was subsequently popularised in US political discourse in the early 2020s by discussion and criticism surrounding attitudes expressed by Elon Musk and members of the Trump administration in 2024 and 2025.

== Definition ==
According to the definition given by University of Amsterdam disability studies researcher Anna de Hooge, the fundamental idea of Aspie supremacism consists of defining a subcategory of autistic individuals (such as white-skinned men with Asperger syndrome who have a productive job) and differentiating it from other categories of autistic people and from people who are not autistic, by assigning to the category a superiority over all others. Hooge distinguishes Aspie supremacism and autistic supremacism, arguing that the former is enabled by social privilege while the latter is not.

Autistic community writer Fergus Murray described the ideology as typically emphasizing the cognitive abilities, logical thinking, and specific skills of certain autistic people as markers of superiority. He described the mindset as frequently intersecting with broader ideological positions regarding meritocracy and hierarchical social organizations.

== History ==
Anna de Hooge studied Aspie supremacism in a 2019 publication. She argued that the movement defined the superiority of individuals concerned on the basis of demographic factors such as race, gender, and economic value. She links this to Hans Asperger's involvement with the Nazi euthanasia program within which he claimed to have saved the lives of the autistic children under his care by emphasizing their economically valuable qualities (these claims were later disputed and Nazi documentation indicates that Asperger actively collaborated with the Nazi regime, sending children deemed disabled or "autistic psychopaths" to Am Spiegelgrund euthanasia clinic).

Autistic community writer and organizer Fergus Murray elaborated that while Asperger advocated positively for certain autistic individuals he deemed valuable to society, his approach generally reinforced problematic hierarchies among disabled people. Murray and The Independent Washington bureau chief Eric Garcia argued that the development of autism supremacist attitudes often stemmed from experiences of social exclusion and discrimination, with some autistic individuals potentially developing such beliefs as a coping mechanism in response to bullying or isolation. They said that autistic supremacism found particular resonance within certain technology industry circles, where it sometimes aligns with "tech bro" cultural ideals that emphasize individual genius and technological solutions over collective approaches.

== Criticism ==
Autism and disability researchers and writers have criticized the ideology for potentially reinforcing broader societal discrimination and exclusion. Many noted correlations between autism supremacy and other supremacist ideologies such as eugenics and scientific racism, engrained in common underlying patterns of hierarchical thinking.

For Virginia Tech disability researcher Paul Heilker, who cited the existence of Aspie supremacism in 2012, the ideology was originally an attempt to define an autistic identity specifically by whiteness. Autism researchers Sara Acevedo and Suzanne Stoltz linked the movement to the "misuses of neurodiversity", and argued that it has its roots in white supremacist ideology, colonialism, and capitalist systems that "reinforces the archetype of the productive, neoliberal citizen".

Sociological and disability studies researchers claimed that the movement fails to justify the ideas it defends on a factual basis. Hooge and Jacky (Manidoomakwakwe) Ellis expressed that the idea of a category of autistic people superior to others is not based on any objective medical basis, due to the notions of "high-functioning" and "low-functioning" autism being dynamic social categories, and not factual and fixed medical categories.

== Manifestations ==
Hooge believed that contemporary media, in some cases, conveys ideas that are compatible with Aspie supremacism. She cited the BBC television series Sherlock, in which an unofficial Asperger syndrome diagnosis is suggested for the protagonist, who also displays characteristic behavioral traits and regularly recalls his superiority over other individuals.

Businessman and entrepreneur Elon Musk has said "interesting observation" in response to a screen capture of a 4chan post that claimed that only "aneurotypical people" were able to think freely and be trusted with determining the objective truth. Writer Eric Garcia described his response as a representation of Musk's own descriptions of himself having Asperger syndrome and, as a result, of facing social isolation and bullying during his childhood.

== See also ==
- Controversies in autism
- Neurodiversity
