= Mel Baggs =

American blogger (1980–2020)

- Baggs in 2008
- Born: Amanda Melissa Baggs; August 15, 1980; Mountain View, California, U.S.
- Died: April 11, 2020 (aged 39); Burlington, Vermont, U.S.
- Alma mater: De Anza College; Simon's Rock
- Known for: Autism advocacy

YouTube information
- Channel: silentmiaow
- Years active: 2006–2007
- Genres: Autism advocacy; vlogs
- Subscribers: 9.61 thousand
- Views: 5.2 million
- Last updated: October 20, 2025

Mel Baggs (born Amanda Melissa Baggs; August 15, 1980 – April 11, 2020) was an American non-binary writer and disability rights advocate with a focus on developmental disability self-advocacy. They were most well-known for their blog posts and YouTube videos about autism, although they wrote about a variety of disability experiences and disliked being thought of as an "autism blog[ger]". Baggs described themselves as "cognitively disabled, physically disabled, chronically ill, developmentally disabled, and psychiatrically disabled". As an adult, they did not speak and used a communication device.

== Early life ==
Baggs was born in Mountain View, California, on August 15, 1980, to Ronald and Anna (née Lynch) Baggs. In 1994, they attended Harker School, De Anza College and Bard College at Simon's Rock, a college for gifted high school-aged teenagers, at age 14. Baggs moved from California to Vermont to be closer to a friend in 2005.

== Work ==
Baggs created a website titled "Getting the Truth Out", a response to a campaign by the Autism Society of America. They claimed that the ASA's campaign made autistic people objects of pity. They also spoke at conferences about disabilities and worked with Massachusetts Institute of Technology scientists who were researching autism.

In January 2007, Baggs posted a video on YouTube entitled "In My Language" on the topic of autism which became the subject of several articles on CNN. Baggs also guest-blogged about the video on Anderson Cooper's blog and answered questions from the audience via email.

About Baggs, Sanjay Gupta said:

[They] told me that because [they don't] communicate with conventional spoken word, [they are] written off, discarded and thought of as mentally retarded. Nothing could be further from the truth. As I sat with [them] in [their] apartment, I couldn't help but wonder how many more people like Amanda are out there, hidden, but reachable, if we just tried harder.

Video artist Mark Leckey stated he was, in a sense, envious of Baggs' stated empathic relationship to inanimate objects. The singing at the beginning of Leckey's video "Prop4aShw" is from Baggs' "In My Language".

Baggs advocated for a consistent definition of autism awareness, claiming that awareness was misrepresented by both parents and some advocates. They wrote articles in two online blogs: "Ballastexistenz" and "Cussin' and Discussin'".

They were most likely the first person to coin the term "Aspie supremacy" in an article on their blog, "Ballastexistenz", called "Aspie supremacy can kill".

Baggs said they named their first blog "Ballastexistenz" to show that people like them were capable of living a worthy life, since it was derived from a historical German term, "Ballastexistenzen", used to describe disabled people as incapable.

Baggs wrote about numerous other syndromes and disabilities, including obsessive–compulsive disorder, Tourette syndrome, post-traumatic stress disorder, craniofacial abnormality, synesthesia, bronchiectasis, hypermobility, Irlen syndrome, and asthma.

== Personal life ==
Baggs described themself as genderless and nonbinary in their writings. They also identified as a lesbian and used any pronouns except it, though they preferred the neopronouns sie/hir and ze/zer.

Baggs spoke about having other disabling conditions in addition to autism. Several classmates of Baggs have found the presence of their alleged impairments to be unusual, subsequently claiming that Baggs "spoke, attended classes, dated, and otherwise acted in a completely typical fashion". According to these classmates, Baggs functioned as a typically-developing adolescent, and began to suffer psychological problems after long-term use of heavy doses of psychedelic drugs, resulting in a mental breakdown, after which Baggs withdrew from Simon's Rock and spent time in a psychiatric hospital. After leaving Simon's Rock, Baggs wrote extensively on Deja News in the late 1990s, discussing their drug use and mental breakdown, stating that they had been diagnosed with schizophrenia, and theorizing that they may also have had dissociative identity disorder (DID). However, in 1997, Baggs said they had been wrong about having DID, explaining that the "voices" that they had thought were DID alters were instead caused by "schizophrenia/schizoaffective/whatever". In 2013, Baggs said that they had been diagnosed with gastroparesis and were now using a feeding tube.

Baggs claimed a loss of all functional speech in their 20s. Other autism advocates have questioned the validity of their diagnosis, citing that Baggs did not meet many of the requirements of low-functioning autism.

Baggs claimed that augmentative communication is somewhat common among autistic individuals, though they also supported the use of the controversial facilitated communication and other widely scientifically discredited alternative therapies. Baggs claimed to use FC, and that Fey, their cat, was their best facilitator as Fey moved their limbs around.

== Death ==
Baggs died on April 11, 2020, at the age of 39, in Burlington, Vermont; their mother said that the cause of their death was believed to be respiratory failure.

== Selected publications ==
- Baggs, Mel (2020). "Losing". Autistic Community and the Neurodiversity Movement: Stories from the Frontline. Springer. pp. 77–86. ISBN 978-981-13-8437-0.
- Picard, Rosalind W.; Smith, Joel; Baggs, Amanda. "Toward a voice for everyone". MIT Media Lab.
- Baggs, Amanda (February 21, 2007). "Why we should listen to 'unusual' voices". CNN.
- Baggs, Amanda. "In My Language" (YouTube, 2007)
