= Jeannette Kagame =

First Lady of Rwanda

Jeannette Nyiramongi Murutubarwe Kagame
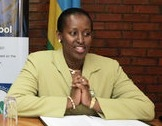
- Kagame in 2008

First Lady of Rwanda
- Current
- Assumed role 22 April 2000
- President: Paul Kagame
- Preceded by: Serafina Bizimungu

First Lady of African Union
- In role 30 January 2018 – 10 February 2019
- President: Paul Kagame
- Preceded by: Djene Kaba Condé
- Succeeded by: Entissar Amer

Second Lady of Rwanda
- In office 19 July 1994 – 22 April 2000
- Vice President: Paul Kagame
- Preceded by: Role established
- Succeeded by: Role abolished

Personal details
- Born: Jeannette Nyiramongi; 10 August 1962 (age 64) Ngozi, Burundi
- Spouse: Paul Kagame (m. 1989)
- Children: Four
- Profession: First Lady of Rwanda
- Website: www.imbutofoundation.org jeannettekagame.com

Jeannette Nyiramongi Kagame (Jeannette Nyiramongi, born 10 August 1962) is the wife of Paul Kagame, the President of Rwanda since 2000. She became the First Lady of Rwanda when her husband took office. Kagame is the founder and chairman of Imbuto Foundation, a non-profit organization whose mission is to support the development of a healthy, educated and prosperous society.

Jeannette Kagame returned to her native Rwanda following the 1994 Rwandan genocide. She has since focused on issues affecting vulnerable population in Rwanda, particularly those of widows, orphans and impoverished families.

== Biography ==
Kagame holds a degree in Business and Management.

Kagame hosted the first African First Ladies’ Summit on Children and HIV/AIDS Prevention in May 2001 in Kigali. The summit led to the founding of the PACFA (Protection and Care of Families against HIV/AIDS). An initiative primarily focused on providing a holistic approach to HIV prevention and care for families. Kagame later co-founded the Organisation of African First Ladies against HIV/AIDS (OAFLA) in 2002, and served as its president from 2004 to 2006.

PACFA expanded to include projects other than those related to HIV/AIDS and in 2007 the Imbuto Foundation - which means "seed" in Kinyarwanda - was established. The foundation implements various projects such as extending basic care and economic support to HIV affected families; enhancing knowledge and changing attitudes towards adolescent sexual and reproductive health; protecting youth against HIV/AIDS; malaria prevention; motivating girls to excel in school; providing scholarships to disadvantaged youth; promoting a reading culture; mentoring and equipping youth with entrepreneurial and leadership skills.

She is also a patron of the Rotary Club Virunga, based in Kigali, which established the first public library in Rwanda in 2012. Kagame is also a member of the board of directors for several organizations, including the Global Coalition of Women against HIV/AIDS and the Friends of the Global Fund Africa.

In 2010, Kagame received an Honorary Doctor of Laws from Oklahoma Christian University for her contribution to the worldwide fight against HIV/AIDS and poverty. In the same year, she was appointed Special Representative on Child Nutrition by the World Food Program (WFP). In 2009, UNICEF presented the Children’s Champions Award to President Paul Kagame and First Lady Jeannette Kagame in recognition of their efforts at improving the lives of children in Rwanda. In 2007, World Health Organization (WHO) appointed her the High Representative of the Africa AIDS Vaccine Program (AAVP), to ensure the active participation of African stakeholders in all areas of HIV and AIDS vaccine research and development.

In December 2018, Kagame was named UNAIDS Special Ambassador of Adolescent Health and Well Being.
