= Tatiana Mukakibibi =

Rwandan journalist

- Born: 1965
- Citizenship: Rwanda
- Occupation: Journalist

Tatiana Mukakibibi (born 1965) is a former journalist and radio presenter in Rwanda.

She was imprisoned without formal trial for over 10 years, accused of inciting violence through her broadcasts during the early days of the Rwandan genocide. After pressure from international organizations including Reporters Without Borders and Journaliste en danger, she was acquitted and released in November 2007.

== Biography ==
Mukakibibi was born in 1965 in Rwanda's Muhanga region, which was then known as Gitarama.

She became a host and producer of programs on Radio Rwanda, where she worked with the prize-winning journalist André Sibomana.

She has one daughter.

=== Arrest and imprisonment ===
After the massacres of April 1994 that marked the beginning of the Rwandan genocide, Radio Rwanda broadcast official government communiques and lists of deceased persons sent by the country's prefectures. On July 4, 1994, after the evacuation of Kigali, Mukakibibi sought refuge along with other journalists in the Democratic Republic of the Congo. She returned to Rwanda on August 10, 1994, to work with Sibomana, and they settled in Kabgayi in the Gitarama region.

In July 1995, she was arrested for the first time and detained for a few days. Fearing further retaliation, she fled to Uganda.

Then, on September 30, 1996, she returned once more to Rwanda. After being spotted by the authorities, she was arrested on October 2, 1996, in Ntenyo. She was accused of having killed a Tutsi journalist, Eugène Bwanamudogo, who had produced radio programs for the Ministry of Agriculture. Mukakibibi denied the accusation, pointing out that she was off reporting in Cyangugu at the time of Bwanamudogo's death and therefore could not have killed him. She suggested she was targeted to silence Sibomana, who was disseminating reports critical of the Tutsi reprisals and who died less than two years after her arrest.

According to journalists from Reporters Without Borders, who found a witness to Bwanamudogo's death, he was killed by soldiers in the early days of the genocide. They suggest Mukakibibi was arrested due to testimony against her from the victim's sister. There was conflict between the two families, because Mukakibibi's brother may have been part of a massacre against members of Bwanamudogo's family.

She appeared in front of a Gacaca court—a people's court set up to try Rwandans implicated in the 1994 genocide. There, she was labeled a member of the category of "the planners, organizers, inciters, supervisors, and framers of genocide," which carries a death sentence. Beyond the killing of Bwanamudogo, the accusations against her focused on the communiques and lists of names Mukakibibi broadcast in the early days of the genocide, as well as a statement announcing the evacuation of Kigali on July 4, 1994.

After that point, she was detained without formal trial at a communal prison in Ntenyo, in the Gitarama region, for over a decade. Various international organizations, including Reporters Without Borders, fought for her release.

In November 2007, she was finally acquitted by a Gacaca court and released after 11 years of detention. Before her release, she had been held longer than any of the other female journalists imprisoned around the world at that time.
