= Ferdinand Nahimana =

Rwandan historian and convicted war criminal

- Born: 15 June 1950 (age 76); Gatonde commune, Ruhengeri prefecture, Ruanda-Urundi
- Political party: National Republican Movement for Democracy and Development
- Status: Released
- Criminal charges: Conspiracy to commit genocide, genocide, direct and public incitement to commit genocide, complicity in genocide, and crimes against humanity (ICTR-96-11-I on 15 November 1999)
- Penalty: Life imprisonment, reduced to a 30-year sentence (28 November 2007 by the ICTR Appeals Chamber)

Ferdinand Nahimana (born 15 June 1950) is a Rwandan historian, who was convicted of incitement to genocide for his role in the 1994 Rwandan genocide.

Nahimana was co-founder of the radio station Radio Télévision Libre des Mille Collines (RTLM), which during the genocide broadcast information and propaganda that helped coordinate the killings and fuel the hatred against Tutsi and moderate Hutu victims.

== Personal life ==
Ferdinand Nahimana was born on 15 July in the Gatonde commune, in the Ruhengeri Prefecture. He is married with four children.

He holds a Doctorate of History from the University Paris Diderot. Between 1979 and 2007, he published many books and articles about Rwandan history.

== Rwandan genocide ==
Under the terms of the Arusha peace agreements, he was nominated as Higher Education Minister for Culture and Scientific Research. Nahimana was a member of the National Republican Movement for Democracy and Development, Habyarimana's political party.

Between 1979 and 1994, Nahimana is alleged to have written and published articles encouraging an uprising against the Tutsis and moderate Hutus.

Having been dismissed from the Rwandan National Radio in 1993, he took part in the creation of the RTLM, and according to the International Criminal Tribunal for Rwanda (ICTR), became its director. Due to this involvement, he was accused of having "directly encouraged" the killings. Between April 1993 and 31 July 1994, Ferdinand Nahimana was accused of having planned, directed and supported the broadcasts of the RTLM. The ICTR prosecutor alleged that “he was aware of the programmes and the effect that these programmes had on the population”.

He was further accused of having organised, with the assistance of his brother, meetings between the MRND and the Interahamwe military in the Ruhengeri Prefecture, with the intent of discussing the killings of Tutsis and Hutus.

In April 1994, as the violence erupted in Rwanda after President Juvénal Habyarimana's assassination, the French embassy took Ferdinand Nahimana in. On 12 April, the French embassy was evacuated and Nahimana, along with his family and others who had taken refuge there, was flown to Burundi. Burundi was unwilling to receive this group of refugees, and Nahimana was therefore sent by plane on 17 April to Bukavu. Nahimana and the other refugees were then repatriated to Rwanda on 23 April. Nahimana was later arrested in Cameroon on 27 March 1996.

== Trial and sentence ==
Nahimana was indicted for incitement to genocide and tried at the International Criminal Tribunal for Rwanda's Media Case by Gregory Gordon, together with two others who had been involved with the RTLM: Hassan Ngeze and Jean Bosco Barayagwiza. Nahimana claimed that he was innocent and denied having editorial control of the RTLM broadcasts during the killings: "I couldn't recognise the RTLM of those days from the one that existed before 6 April. It had been appropriated by radicals, what are now called extremists, whose way of seeing and doing things I did not share".

The "hate media trials" received attention since it was the first time since the Nuremberg trials that hate speech had been prosecuted as a war crime. On 3 December 2003, Ferdinand Nahimana was sentenced to life imprisonment, guilty of genocide, conspiracy to commit genocide, incitement, directly and publicly, to commit genocide, complicity in genocide and crimes against humanity. Hassan Ngeze also got a life sentence, and Jean Bosco Barayagwiza was sentenced to 35 years in prison. Despite the sentences' possible impact on freedom of the press, Reporters Without Borders welcomed the outcome of the trial.

Despite the assertion of his French lawyer Jean-Marie Biju-Duval that Nahimana, founder of the Radio Télévision Libre des Mille Collines (RTLM), no longer exerted any role on the radio starting 6 April 1994, he was convicted for his responsibility as a senior ranking official in RTLM.

The Rwandan historian was convicted for having done nothing to stop the inflammatory content of the RTLM radio programmes after 6 April 1994, as he had, according to the judgment, an authority on the personnel of the radio station.

Ferdinand Nahimana appealed his conviction, and the trial before the Appeals Chamber opened on 16 January 2007. On 28 November 2007, the Appeals Chamber reduced his prison term to 30 years. The Appeals Chamber overturned some of his convictions, notably those which concerned events that had taken place before 1994. The Appeals Chamber also overturned the initial conclusion that there had been an agreement between the RTLM, the CDR, and Kangura to assist in committing genocide. It therefore reversed the charges against Nahimana under Article 6 (1) of the Statute, but upheld those under Article 6(3)—namely, those of "inciting directly and publicly to the commission of genocide and for persecution as a crime against humanity" by means of the RTLM broadcasts after 6 April 1994. According to JusticeInfo.net:

The appeals judges deemed Nahimana criminally responsible only for not having used his de facto authority over RTLM staff to prevent or stop the broadcast of programmes inciting hatred of Tutsis after the assassination of Hutu president Juvénal Habyarimana on April 6, 1994.

In December 2008, he has been transferred from Arusha of Tanzania to Mali. In 2016, he was granted an early release after exhibiting "some signs of rehabilitation", having served two-thirds of his sentence.

=== Controversy over conviction ===
A 2010 book written by journalist and historian Hervé Deguine argues that the motives invoked in Nahimana's trial were based on very little evidence except that he founded and was one of the owners of the radio station, exposing arguments and circumstantial evidence against his conviction. Although Deguine had himself contributed to Nahimana's conviction, he concludes his book by affirming that on the basis of judicial proofs, Nahimana should be released.

== Bibliography ==
- 2007: Rwanda: les virages ratés, Éditions Sources du Nil, France.
- 1995: Rwanda. L’élite Hutu accusée, Cameroon.
- 1993: Le Rwanda: émergence d'un État, Harmattan, Paris.
- 1988: Conscience chez nous, confiance en nous. Notre culture est la base de notre développement harmonieux, I.N.R, Rwanda.
- 1987: Le Blanc est arrivé, le Roi est parti. Une facette de l'histoire du Rwanda contemporain, 1884–1931, Rwanda.
