= Robert Kajuga (Interahamwe) =

Rwandan war criminal (1960–before 2007)

- Born: Jerry Robert Kajuga; 1960; Kibungo, Ruanda-Urundi
- Died: before March 2007; Kinshasa, DRC
- Allegiance: Rwanda
- Conviction: Crimes against humanity
- Penalty: Life imprisonment

Details
- Date apprehended: 1996
- Imprisoned at: Butare

Jerry Robert Kajuga (1960 – before March 2007) was national president of the Interahamwe, the group largely responsible for perpetrating the Rwandan genocide against the Tutsi people in 1994. Born to a Tutsi father and a Hutu mother, Kajuga concealed his background and presented himself as being of pure Hutu descent. This is notable as Hutu Power extremist groups considered Hutus who married Tutsis to be race traitors, and Kajuga went to great lengths to conceal his identity.

== Biography ==
Kajuga was born in Kibungo to a mixed-tribal family: his mother was Hutu and his father was Tutsi but had acquired false Hutu identity papers. He was a young brother of Huss Mugwaneza Kajuga, nicknamed "millionaire of Rukara," the boss of SORIMEX-Rwanda, a company that manufactured tooth pastes and palmolive soap. To avoid any kind of suspicion about their family being Tutsi, Robert Kajuga kept his brother hidden at the Hôtel des Mille Collines in Kigali. According to Paul Rusesabagina, who managed the hotel, Kajuga was one of the many infiltrators within the Interahamwe sent by Tutsi rebel leader Paul Kagame.

Kajuga defended his participation in the genocide by arguing that Tutsis were responsible for trying to "take power" and stated "[we] defended ourselves. Even the eleven-year-old children came with grenades. That’s why there are bodies at the roadblocks."

One source alleges that Kajuga was apprehended in the nearby Democratic Republic of the Congo after the genocide and transferred to Kigali where he was sentenced to life imprisonment and later died in prison. However, his cousin Prosper Ingabire alleged in an ICTR testimony that Kajuga died sometime after the Rwandan Genocide in Kinshasa following a long illness that kept him bedridden throughout the genocide.
