= Inyenzi =

Inyenzi may refer to:

- Inyenzi movement, a Rwandan rebel movement in the 1960s
- "Inyenzi", an ethnic slur directed at Tutsi, see list of ethnic slurs
- Inyenzi, a 2000 novel by Andrew Brown

== See also ==
- Inyenzi ou les Cafards (lit. 'Inyenzi or the Cockroaches'), published in English as Cockroaches, a 2006 memoir by Scholastique Mukasong
