= Génocidaires =

Rwandan genocide participants

Génocidaires (French pronunciation: [ʒenɔsidɛʁ], lit. 'genociders' or 'genocidals') are those who commit acts of genocide, specifically the Rwandan genocide.

== History ==
The term was used initially in reference to those Rwandans who are guilty of genocide for their involvement in the mass killings which were perpetrated during the 1994 Rwandan genocide, in which 800,000 Rwandans, primarily Tutsis and moderate Hutus, were murdered by the Interahamwe, a Hutu paramilitary group. In the aftermath of the genocide, the people who organized and led the genocide were put on trial at the International Criminal Tribunal for Rwanda. Those guilty of lesser crimes, such as participation, profiting through seizing Tutsi property, and the like, were put on trial in gacaca courts. The ICTR has indicted over 93 people for genocide.

In 2020, Félicien Kabuga, the main financier of the Rwandan genocide, was found in a suburb of Paris, France, after he had evaded capture for over 26 years.

== See also ==
- Interahamwe
- Hutu regime in Rwanda
- List of people indicted in the International Criminal Tribunal for Rwanda
- Perpetrators, victims, and bystanders

== Sources ==
- Jessee, Erin (2019). "Beyond Perpetrators: Complex Political Actors Surrounding the 1994 Genocide in Rwanda". In Smeulers, Alette; Weerdesteijn, Maartje; Hola, Barbora (eds.). Perpetrators of International Crimes: Theories, Methods, and Evidence. Oxford University Press. ISBN 978-0-19-882999-7.
