= Hate media =

Communication medium promoting hatred

Hate media is media that contributes to the demonization and stigmatization of people who belong to different groups. It has played an influential role in the incitement to genocide, with notable examples of it being Radio Televizija Srbije during the wars in Yugoslavia, Radio Télévision Libre des Mille Collines (RTLM) during the Rwandan genocide and Nazi Germany's Der Stürmer newspaper.

== Crime against humanity ==
Hate speech that is promoted by media can be prosecuted by national laws; because of its proven ability to contribute to (and incite) genocide, however, hate media which is used to foment the cleansing of a particular national, ethnic, racial or religious group, in whole or in part, can be prosecuted for inciting genocide under international law. Incitement to genocide was declared a crime against humanity at the Nuremberg trials, but only hate-media propaganda which calls for direct extermination was considered a crime against humanity. This definition was modified in the wake of crimes committed in the former Yugoslavia and Rwanda, and a new definition was provided for the Rwandan tribunals; hate-media propaganda considered to be a crime against humanity must be involved in the direct and indirect incitement of genocide which "must be defined ... as directly provoking the perpetrator(s) to commit genocide, whether through speeches, shouting, or threats uttered in public spaces or at public gatherings or through the sale or dissemination ... of written material or printed matter ... or through the public display of placards or posters, or through another means of audiovisual communication."

== Radio Televizija Srbije (RTS1) and the Yugoslav Wars ==
Two members of the Federal Security Service (KOG) testified for the prosecution in Slobodan Milošević's trial about their involvement in Milošević's propaganda campaign. Slobodan Lazarević described alleged KOG clandestine activities designed to undermine the peace process, including mining a soccer field, a water tower and the reopened railway between Zagreb and Belgrade. The actions were blamed on Croats. KOG assistant chief Mustafa Candić described the use of technology to fabricate a conversation, making it sound as if Croat authorities were telling Croats in Serbia to leave for an ethnically-pure Croatia. The conversation was broadcast after a Serb attack on Croatians living in Serbia, forcing them to flee. He testified about another instance of disinformation involving a television broadcast of corpses described as Serb civilians killed by Croats. Candić testified that he believed that they were the bodies of Croats killed by Serbs, and corroborated the existence of Operations Opera and Labrador.

Vojislav Šešelj, head of the Serbian Radical Party and active in the Yugoslav Wars, was indicted for using propaganda to commit war crimes. Šešelj was accused of instigating crimes which included murder, torture and forcible expulsion on ethnic grounds. The indictment read, "By using the word 'instigated,' the Prosecution charges that the accused Vojislav Šešelj's speeches, communications, acts and/or omissions contributed to the perpetrators' decision to commit the crimes alleged."

== Radio Télévision Libre des Mille Collines and the Rwandan genocide ==
Radio Télévision Libre des Mille Collines (RTLM) contributed to the Rwandan genocide by helping Rwandan authorities to "spur and direct killings in both those areas most eager to attack Tutsi members of the Hutu opposition and in areas where the killings initially were resisted". The radio station helped to fan hatred of the Tutsis by emphasizing their cruelty and ruthlessness and telling "all citizens to see killing Tutsis as their responsibility", issuing instructions and orders to commit genocide. General Roméo Dallaire wrote, "The RTLM was created specifically as a tool of genocidaires to demonize Tutsi, lay the groundwork, then literally drive on the killing once the genocide started". In accordance with the definition of hate-media propaganda as a crime against humanity established at Nuremberg and redefined in the International Criminal Tribunal for Rwanda (ICTR), RTLM founders Ferdinand Nahimana and Jean-Bosco Barayagwiza were sentenced to life in prison by the ICTR.

== Der Stürmer and genocide ==
Der Stürmer was a weekly tabloid, or Nazi newspaper published from 1923 to 1945, led by Julius Streicher. It was known for its extreme anti-Semitic content, using hateful language, grotesque caricatures, and false accusations to demonize Jews and other minorities. The newspaper played a key role in Nazi propaganda, promoting racial ideology and inciting violence against Jews. This incited the genocide of the Jewish people during the Holocaust by fomenting hatred in German society. It was aimed at the general German public, particularly the working class, it was widely distributed and influential in shaping public opinion. It vilified the Jewish people and promulgated racial stereotypes, particularly among its less-educated audience. After the war, Streicher was accused of inciting genocide and sentenced to death by hanging at the Nuremberg trials.
