= Radio Rwanda =

Rwandan Broadcasting Agency radio station

Radio Rwanda (est. 1961) is a radio station of the Rwandan Broadcasting Agency, a public broadcaster that also owns Rwandan Television, Magic FM, and other public radio stations.

Before the attack of the Rwandan Patriotic Front on October 1, 1990, Radio Rwanda was the only national radio station in Rwanda, representing the views of the state and the party in power. Shortly after the start of the war, the Patriotic Front created its own radio station, Radio Muhabura.

In March 1992, Radio Rwanda began to broadcast false information regarding the possible assassination of Hutu officials, after which many Tutsis were consequently killed in the Bugesera region. When the transitional government was installed in April 1992, it demanded a programming change of the radio by President Habyarimana. This preserved the transitional government's role in the state radio, but stopped that of the president's party, the National Republican Movement for Democracy and Development. Due to the growing influence of Radio Muhabura, radical Hutus created a new radio station in 1993, named Radio Télévision Libre des Mille Collines. Radio Télévision Libre frequently made hateful statements against the Tutsis, and several of its journalists were eventually convicted of inciting genocide. Although Radio Rwanda and Radio Télévision Libre were two distinct, independent radio stations, they were broadcast at the same wavelengths at different times, which led the population to confuse them.

Radio Rwanda was reestablished between 1994 and 2000, with financing from the German government.

Today Radio Rwanda has become a national public radio with six regional stations including Magic FM (Kigali), Radio Rusizi, Radio Musanze, Radio Nyagatare, Radio Rubavu, and Radio Huye. The current director is Divin Uwayo.

In 2013, the singer Cécile Kayirebwa sued several Rwandan radio stations including Radio Rwanda. She noted that her music was frequently broadcast, but she had received no royalties.

== Notable hosts ==
- Noël Hitimana
- Tatiana Mukakibibi
- Eliézer Niyitegeka
- André Sibomana

== See also ==
- Media of Rwanda
