= First Lady of Rwanda =

- Incumbent; Jeannette Kagame since March 24, 2000
- Inaugural holder: Vérédiana Kayibanda
- Formation: July 1, 1962

The First Lady of Rwanda is the official title attributed to the wife of the president of Rwanda. The country's current first lady is Jeannette Kagame, wife of President Paul Kagame, who had held the position since March 24, 2000.

== First ladies of Rwanda ==
Name	Portrait	Term Began	Term Ended	President	Notes
Sophie Mbonyumutwa (interim)		January 28, 1961	October 26, 1961	Dominique Mbonyumutwa (interim)	Interim presidency following independence
Vérédiana Mukagatare Kayibanda		July 1, 1962	July 5, 1973	Grégoire Kayibanda	President Kayibanda was overthrown in the 1973 Rwandan coup d'état. Grégoire and Vérédiana Kayibanda were imprisoned by the Juvénal Habyarimana dictatorship following the coup. Vérédiana Kayibanda died under house arrest on October 13, 1974.
Agathe Habyarimana		July 5, 1973	April 6, 1994	Juvénal Habyarimana	Former First Lady Agathe Habyarimana was arrested in France on charges of genocide on 2 March 2010.
Verediane Sindikubwabo		April 9, 1994	July 19, 1994	Théodore Sindikubwabo	Wife of the country's president during the Rwandan genocide.
Serafina Bizimungu		July 19, 1994	March 23, 2000	Pasteur Bizimungu	Serafina Bizimungu is a Tutsi, while her husband, former President Pasteur Bizimungu, is Hutu.
Jeannette Kagame		April 22, 2000		Paul Kagame	Incumbent first lady.
