= Complicity in genocide =

Complicity in genocide encompasses a wide spectrum of conduct involving assistance or encouragement that significantly contributes to, or has a substantial impact on, the commission of the crime of genocide.

It is illegal under international law both for individuals, as part of international criminal law, and state parties to the Genocide Convention. The latter was first held in the Bosnian genocide case (2007) in which the International Court of Justice held Serbia responsible for failure to prevent the Bosnian genocide.

Complicity in genocide is contrasted by the Responsibility-to-protect (R2P) doctrine which is a commitment by UN members to intervene to prevent atrocities, including genocide.

== Genocide Convention ==
Article III of the 1948 Genocide Convention considers "complicity in genocide" a "punishable act"

== Forms of complicity ==
Complicity in genocide applies to a broad range of acts of assistance or encouragement that have "substantially contributed to, or have had a substantial effect on, the completion of the crime of genocide."

Complicity itself can take multiple forms, including aiding, abetting, incitement, covering up evidence, or harboring genocide perpetrators.

== Responsibility to protect ==
The responsibility-to-protect (R2P or RtoP) is a global political commitment which was endorsed by the United Nations General Assembly at the 2005 World Summit in order to address its four key concerns to prevent genocide, war crimes, ethnic cleansing and crimes against humanity. The doctrine has become a unanimous and well-established international norm since the early 2000s.

R2P entails a responsibility to protect all populations from mass atrocity crimes and human rights violations. The responsibility to protect provides a framework for employing measures (i.e., mediation, early warning mechanisms, economic sanctions, and chapter VII powers) to prevent atrocity crimes and to protect civilians from their occurrence.

The R2P doctrine has been the subject of considerable debate, particularly regarding the implementation or lack thereof by various actors in the context of country-specific situations, such as Kenya, Libya, Syria, Nagorno-Karabakh, and Palestine. Multiple scholars argue that the inaction of the international community to confirmed atrocities exposes the irrelevance and weakness of the R2P doctrine.

== See also ==
- Crimes against humanity
- Genocides in history
- Genocide studies

== Sources ==
- Moses, Jeremy (14 March 2024). "Gaza and the Political and Moral Failure of the Responsibility to Protect". Journal of Intervention and Statebuilding. 18 (2): 211–215. doi:10.1080/17502977.2024.2304987. ISSN 1750-2977.
- Sirleaf, Matiangai V. S. (2024). "Palestine as a Litmus Test for Transitional Justice". The International Journal of Transitional Justice. 18 (1): 162–188. doi:10.1093/ijtj/ijae012.
- Verdeja, Ernesto (20 January 2025). "The Gaza Genocide in Five Crises". Journal of Genocide Research (Forum: Israel-Palestine: Atrocity Crimes and the Crisis of Holocaust and Genocide Studies): 1–23. doi:10.1080/14623528.2025.2452707.
