= Interahamwe =

Paramilitary group involved in 1994 Rwandan Genocide

- Flag of the Interahamwe
- President: Robert Kajuga
- Vice President: Georges Rutaganda
- Other figures: Augustin Bizimungu; Tharcisse Renzaho; Ildéphonse Hategekimana; Ildéphonse Nizeyimana; Protais Mpiranya; Callixte Nzabonimana; Aloys Ndimbati
- Active regions: Jungles of Uganda and the Democratic Republic of the Congo; formerly Rwanda
- Ideology: Hutu Power; Ultranationalism
- Political position: Far-right
- Size: 100,000 (1994); 20,000 (1998)
- Part of: MRND
- Wars: Rwandan genocide First Congo War; Second Congo War

The Interahamwe (/ˌɪntərəˈhɑːmweɪ/, Kinyarwanda pronunciation: [í.nɦêː.ɾɑ́.hɑ́.mŋe]) is a Hutu paramilitary organization active in the Democratic Republic of the Congo and Uganda. The Interahamwe was formed around 1990, as the youth wing of the National Republican Movement for Democracy and Development (MRND according to its French name), the then-ruling party of Rwanda, and enjoyed the backing of the Hutu Power government. The Interahamwe, led by Robert Kajuga, were the main perpetrators of the Rwandan genocide, during which an estimated 500,000 to 1,000,000 Tutsi, Twa, and moderate Hutus were killed from April to July 1994, and the term "Interahamwe" was widened to mean any civilian militias or bands killing Tutsi.

The Interahamwe were driven out of Rwanda after Tutsi-led Rwandan Patriotic Front (RPF) victory in the Rwandan Civil War in July 1994, and are considered a terrorist organization by many African and Western governments. The Interahamwe and splinter groups such as the Democratic Forces for the Liberation of Rwanda (FDLR) continue to wage an insurgency against Rwanda from neighboring countries, where they are also involved in local conflicts and terrorism.

== Etymology ==
The name Interahamwe can be translated as "those who attack together" or loosely as "those who fight together" in Kinyarwanda. Work, in racist radio broadcasts during the genocide, was used as slang that meant using machetes to kill. Intera is derived from the verb gutera, meaning "to attack"; while hamwe means "together" and is related to the word rimwe for "one".

== Organization and history ==
Robert Kajuga, a half Tutsi (unusual for this group), was the president of the Interahamwe. The vice president of Interahamwe was Georges Rutaganda. The Interahamwe was formed from groups of young people of the MRND party. They carried out the Rwandan genocide against the Tutsis in 1994.

The radio station RTLM, founded by a group of Hutu extremists, was popular amongst the Interahamwe for its decidedly pro-Hutu agenda, among other things. From October 1993 to late 1994, it was used as an outlet for extremists to release ethnocentric and xenophobic propaganda targeted at the Tutsis, moderate Hutus and Belgians. Often it encouraged the ongoing acts of genocide by promoting fear among the Hutus that the Tutsis would massacre them, and broadcasting the positions of Tutsis hiding or attempting to flee.

Following the invasion of the Rwandan capital Kigali by the Tutsi Rwandan Patriotic Front (RPF), many Rwandan civilians and members of the Interahamwe fled to neighbouring countries, most notably to what at the time was Zaire, now Democratic Republic of Congo, and Tanzania. Sudan welcomed former Interahamwe to Juba, and in March 1998, Colonel Tharcisse Renzaho, the former prefect of Kigali, and Colonel Aloys Ntiwiragabo, the former Rwandan Presidential Guard commander, arrived in Juba from Nairobi to organize them. It has been nearly impossible to bring the Interahamwe to justice because they did not wear uniforms or have a clearly organized group of followers. They were the neighbours, friends and co-workers of Tutsis. Throughout the war, members of the Interahamwe moved into camps of refugees and the internally displaced. There the victims were mixed in with the enemy making it difficult to prosecute members of the Interahamwe. But the Gacaca court was put in place to at least attempt to get the killers in jail. It has seen criticism from many different sources for being flawed with the judges having inadequate training and many different parties in the court system being corrupt. This problem has led to many innocent people being put in jail and has caused the prisons to become overcrowded.

During the war, millions of Rwandan Hutu refugees fled to Zaire (now the Democratic Republic of the Congo), along with many members of the Interahamwe, Presidential Guard and the Rwandan Government Forces (RGF). Following the recruitment of significant numbers of Congolese Hutu the organisation took the name Armée de Libération du Rwanda (ALiR). With the Kagame regime still in power, members still take part in border raids from the refugee camps.

== After the Rwandan genocide ==
In 1999, Interahamwe attacked and kidnapped a group of 14 tourists in Bwindi National Park, Uganda. Eight of the tourists were killed. The story was featured on National Geographic, Locked Up Abroad: Uganda.

== Prosecution ==
Leaders of the Interahamwe have been primarily prosecuted through the International Criminal Tribunal for Rwanda in Arusha, Tanzania. The tribunal has convicted at least 41 persons, often with life sentences, including former interim Prime Minister Jean Kambanda and Georges Rutaganda. Fugitives have been captured and prosecuted in other countries, including Jean-Marie Vianney Mudahinyuka (a.k.a. "Zuzu"), an Interahamwe leader found hiding in Chicago, Illinois in January 2011.
