= List of Rwandans =

This is a list of notable people from Rwanda, not including people of full or partial Rwandan descent but not in nationality (like Stromae or Zhan Beleniuk).

== Arts and media ==
=== Filmmaking ===
- Thierry Dushimirimana, photographer and filmmaker
- Armand Kajangwe, Rwandan—Swiss filmmaker
- Jean Luc Mitana (born 1983), filmmaker and cinematographer

=== Music ===
- Teta Diana (b. 1992), musician
- Tuyishime Joshua, (1988–2021) musician

=== Performing arts ===
- Bahavu Jeannette, actress
- Didier Kamanzi, Burundi–born Rwandan actor
- Musanase Laura (born 1993), actress

=== Visual art and design ===
- Thierry Dushimirimana, photographer and filmmaker
- Serrah Galos (born 1995), photographer
- Valerie Piraino (born 1981), Rwandan-born American sculptor, installation artist, and works on paper
- Moses Turahirwa, fashion designer

=== Writing ===
- Gabriel Gabiro, (b. 1981) journalist
- Immaculée Ilibagiza, Rwandan-American author, Genocide survivor
- Charles Ingabire, journalist and government critic, murdered in 2011
- Gaspard Musabyimana (born 1955), writer
- Hassan Ngeze (born 1962), journalist
- Venuste Nshimiyimana, Rwandan-born Belgian journalist
- Jean-Léonard Rugambage, journalist and government critic, murdered in 2010
- Benjamin Sehene (born 1959), author

== Business and finance ==
- Kate Bashabe (b. 1990) entrepreneur and philanthropist
- Félicien Kabuga (b. 1935), businessman
- Nathalie Mpaka, chief financial officer at BK Group
- Epiphanie Mukashyaka, businesswoman
- Jean D'Amour Mutoni (born 1986) social entrepreneur, and CEO
- Samuel Ndashyikirwa, businessman
- Étienne Nzabonimana (born 1950), businessman

== Military ==
- Théoneste Bagosora (b. 1941), military officer convicted in 2008 of genocide
- Bernard Ntuyahaga
- Kayumba Nyamwasa, former army chief of staff and head of Intelligence
- James Kabarebe, current minister of defense
- Patrick Nyamvumba, current RDF chief of staff
- Augustin Bizimungu
- Innocent Sagahutu

== Politics ==
- Agathe Uwilingiyimana former Prime Minister of Rwanda
- Jean-Paul Akayesu (b. 1953), politician convicted in 1998 of genocide
- Jean Bosco Barayagwiza
- Christophe Bazivamo, Minister of Land and Environment
- Augustin Bizimana (b. 1954), politician, fugitive of the International Criminal Tribunal for Rwanda
- Jean-Damascène Bizimana, former Rwandan ambassador to the UN
- Augustin Bizimungu (b. 1952), politician on trial for genocide
- Pasteur Bizimungu, former President of Rwanda
- Samuel Dusengiyumva, mayor of Kigali
- Anastase Gasana, diplomat
- Marie-Christine Gasingirwa, Director General for Science, Technology and Research at the Ministry of Education
- Juvénal Habyarimana, former President of Rwanda
- Murashi Isaïe, (b. 1949) ambassador of Rwanda to Uganda
- Jean Marie Higiro, former Director of the Rwandan Information Office
- Juliet Kabera, (b. 1978) environmentalist and civil servant
- Paul Kagame, President of Rwanda
- Isabelle Kalihangabo (b. 1972), lawyer and politician
- Jean Kambanda (b. 1955), former Prime Minister; pleaded guilty in 1998 to genocide
- Judith Kanakuze (1959–2010), politician and women's rights activist
- Janvier Kanyamashuli, ambassador to Burundi
- Grégoire Kayibanda, former President of Rwanda
- Kigeri V of Rwanda, former King
- Bernard Makuza, Prime Minister of Rwanda
- Dominique Mbonyumutwa, former provisional President of Rwanda
- Charles Munyaneza (b. 1958), genocide suspect
- Ignace Murwanashyaka (b. 1963), leader of the Democratic Forces for the Liberation of Rwanda
- Mutara II Rwogera, former King
- Mutara III of Rwanda, former King
- Lando Ndasingwa, former leader of Parti libéral du Rwanda
- Lynder Nkuranga, police official
- Joseph Nsengimana, minister of education
- André Ntagerura
- Jean de Dieu Ntiruhungwa, former Minister of the Interior
- Seth Sendashonga, former Minister of the Interior
- André Kagwa Rwisereka (1949–2010), opposition politician murdered during the 2010 election
- Théodore Sindikubwabo, former President of the National Development Council
- Pascal Simbikangwa, former Chief of Intelligence, found guilty of complicity in genocide and complicity in crimes against humanity
- Faustin Twagiramungu, former Prime Minister of Rwanda
- Agathe Uwilingiyimana, former Prime Minister of Rwanda
- Yuhi III of Rwanda, former King of Rwanda
- Protais Zigiranyirazo
- Juvénal Uwilingiyimana

== Religion ==
- Helene Nayituriki (b. 1955), Roman Catholic Bernardine nun
- Elizaphan Ntakirutimana (1924–2007), Seventh-day Adventist pastor
- Athanase Seromba (b. 1963), priest
- Laurien Ntezimana (b. 1955), theologian and peace activist
- Thomas Nahimana (b.1971), President of the Rwandan Government in Exile

== Sport ==
- Dieudonné Disi (b. 1980), long-distance and cross-country runner
- Liliane Mukobwanakawe (b. 1989), Paralympic volleyballer
- Eric Eugène Murangwa (b. 1975), footballer
- Urwibutso Nicole (b. 1994), basketball player
- Adrien Niyonshuti (b. 1987), cyclist
- Junior Ndagano (b. 1985), Rwandan-born Belgian footballer
- Mathias Ntawulikura (b. 1964), long-distance runner

== Miscellaneous ==
- Simon Bikindi (b. 1954), singer-songwriter convicted in 2008 of inciting violence during the 1994 genocide
- Agathe Habyarimana, widow of former President Juvénal Habyarimana
- Mignone Alice Kabera, philanthropist and apostle
- Enos Kagaba, accused of genocide
- Yona Kanamuzeyi, martyr and deacon
- Joseph Kavaruganda, former president of Rwanda's Constitutional Court
- Léon Mugesera, university lecturer accused of inciting genocide
- Sostene Munyurabatware (1947–1994), saved Tutsis from being killed by Hutu militias during the 1994 Rwandan genocide
- Ferdinand Nahimana, historian
- Sonia Rolland, former Miss France
- Queen Rosalie Gicanda, wife of King Mutara III of Rwanda
- Paul Rusesabagina (born 1954), hotel manager known for saving refugees in the 1994 genocide

== See also ==
- List of Rwandan actors
- List of Rwandan writers
- List of presidents of Rwanda
- List of kings of Rwanda
