= List of Rwandan actors =

This is a list of actors and actresses from, or connected to, Rwanda. This list also includes members of the Rwandan diaspora. The list is arranged alphabetically by surname.

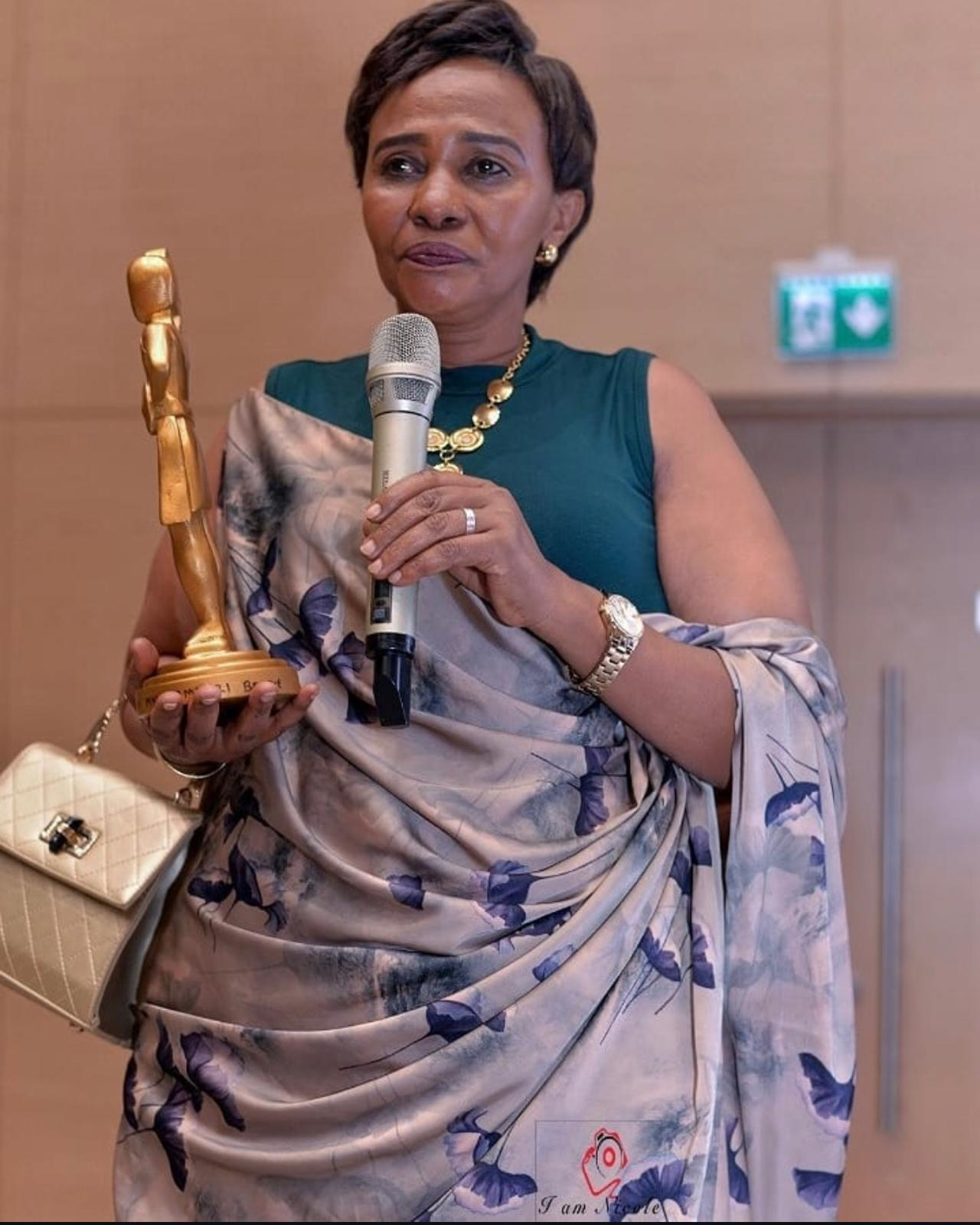
Mukakamanzi Beatha, 2021

== B ==
- Mukakamanzi Beatha

== G ==
- Ncuti Gatwa born 15 October 1992 (age 33)

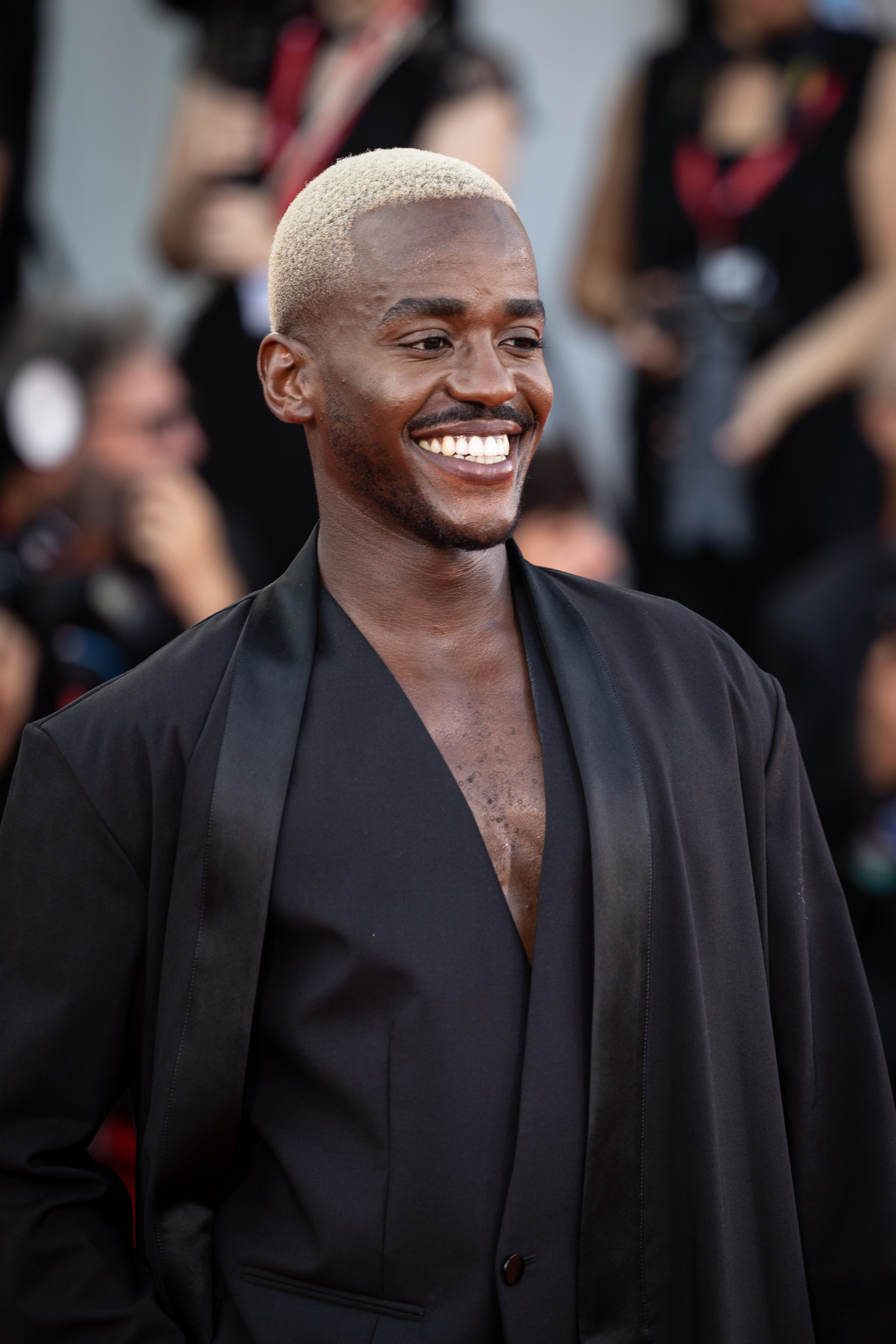
Ncuti Gatwa, 2024

== I ==
- Oceanne Iradukunda born 11 November 1996 (age 29)
- Irakoze Ariane Vanessa born 20 September 2000 (age 25)

== J ==
- Bahavu Jeannette born 17 July 1993 (age 32)

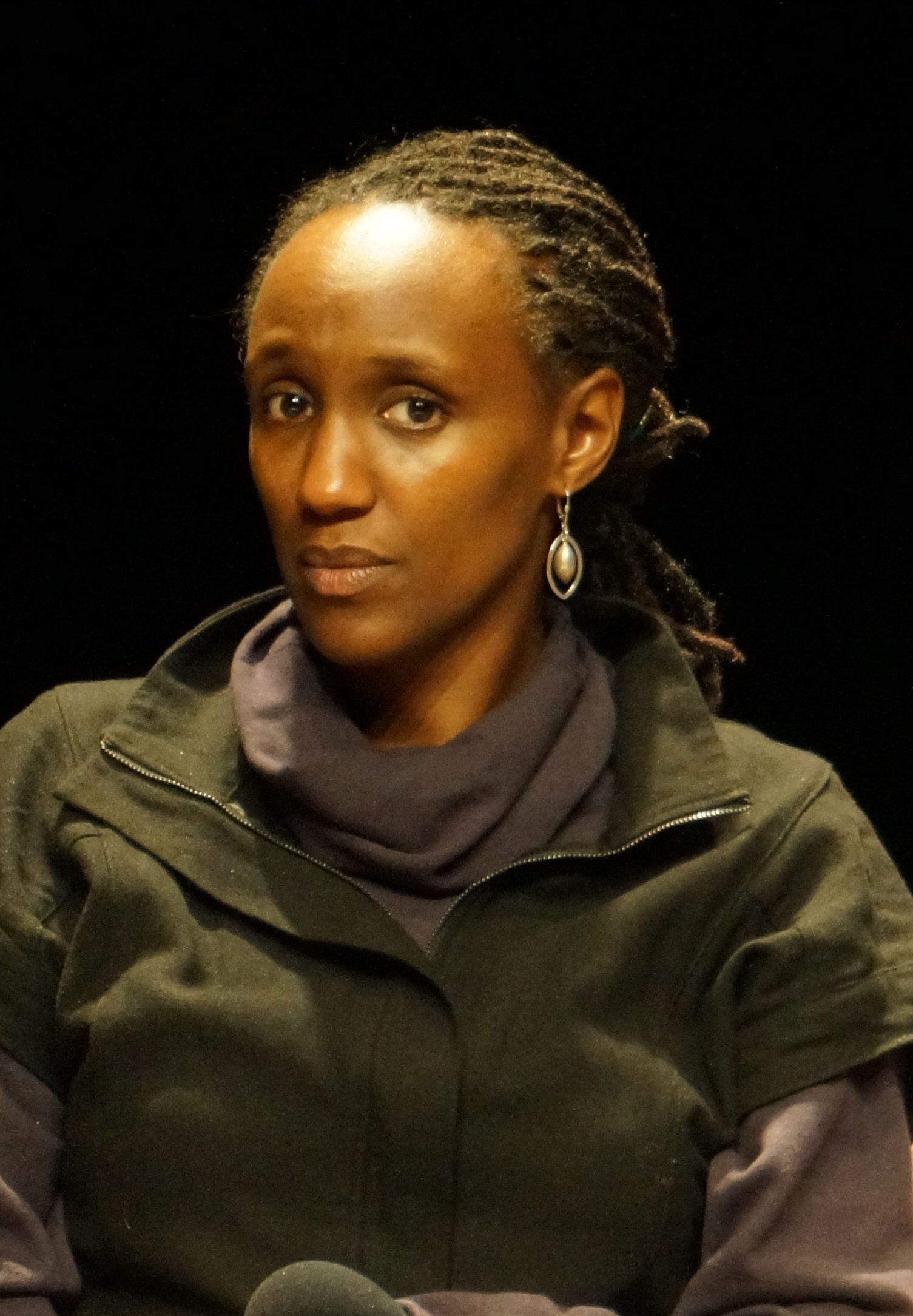
Carole Karemera, 2015

== K ==
- Didier Kamanzi
- Carole Karemera born 1975 (age 49–50)
- Saphine Kirenga born 25 September 1990 (age 35)

== L ==
- Musanase Laura born 1993 (age 31–32)

== M ==
- Dorothée Munyaneza born 1982 (age 42–43)
- Alexia Mupende (1984 – 2019)
- Cedrick Mugisha born 14 May 1982 (age 43)
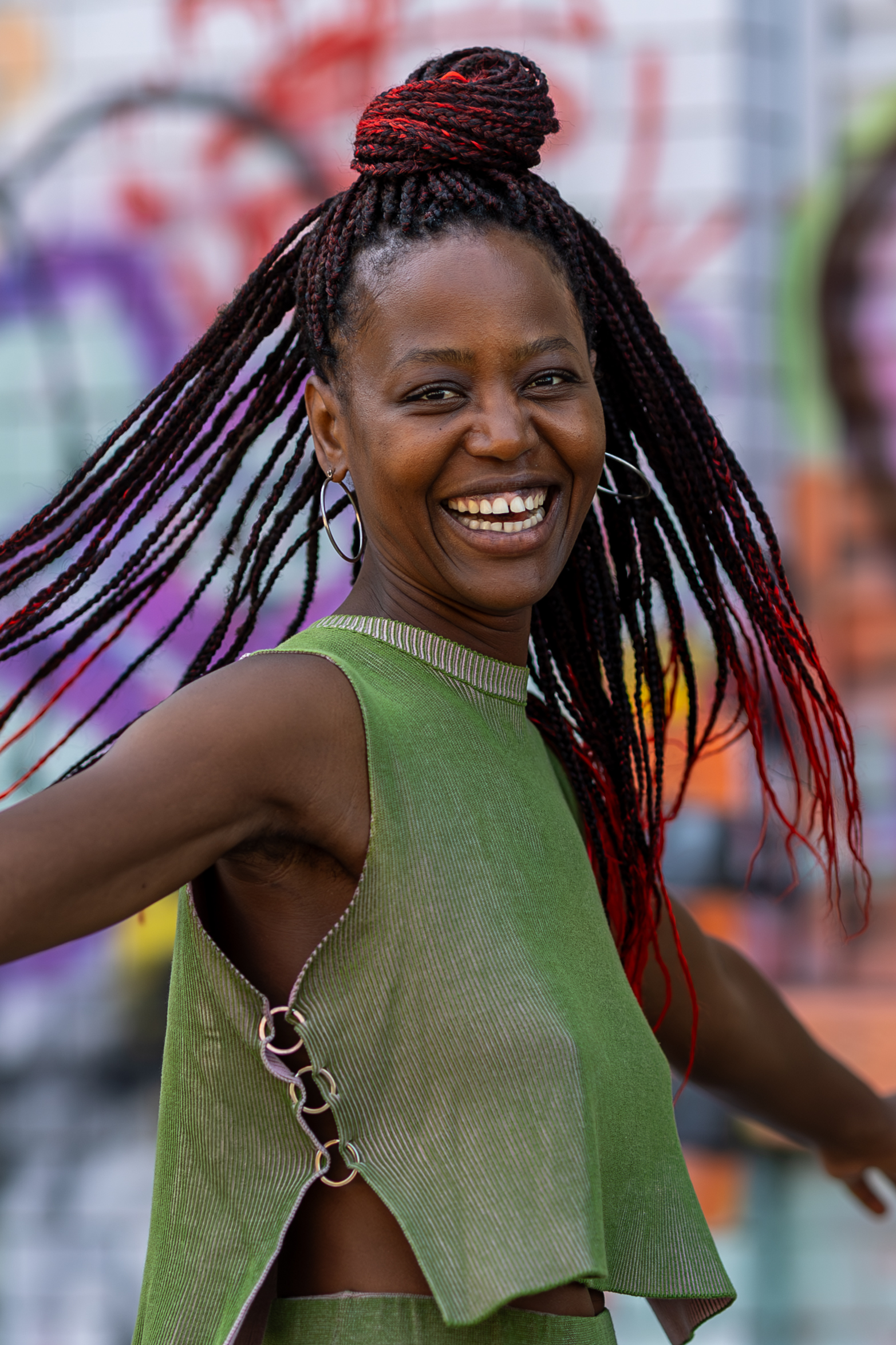
- Dorothée Munyaneza, 2025
  Natacha Muziramakenga born 1984 (age 40–41)

== N ==
- Arthur Nkusi born 22 January 1991 (age 34)
- Denis Nsanzamahoro (1976 – 2019)
- Roger Nsengiyumva born 1 May 1994 (age 31)

== P ==
- Ingabire Pascaline born 1995 (age 29–30)
- Anita Pendo born 14 February 1986 (age 39)

== R ==
- Sonia Rolland born 11 February 1981 (age 44)
- Dorcy Rugamba born 1969 (age 55–56)
- Lionël Ruzindana born 1987 (age 37–38)

== S ==
- Miss Shanel born 26 October 1985 (age 40)

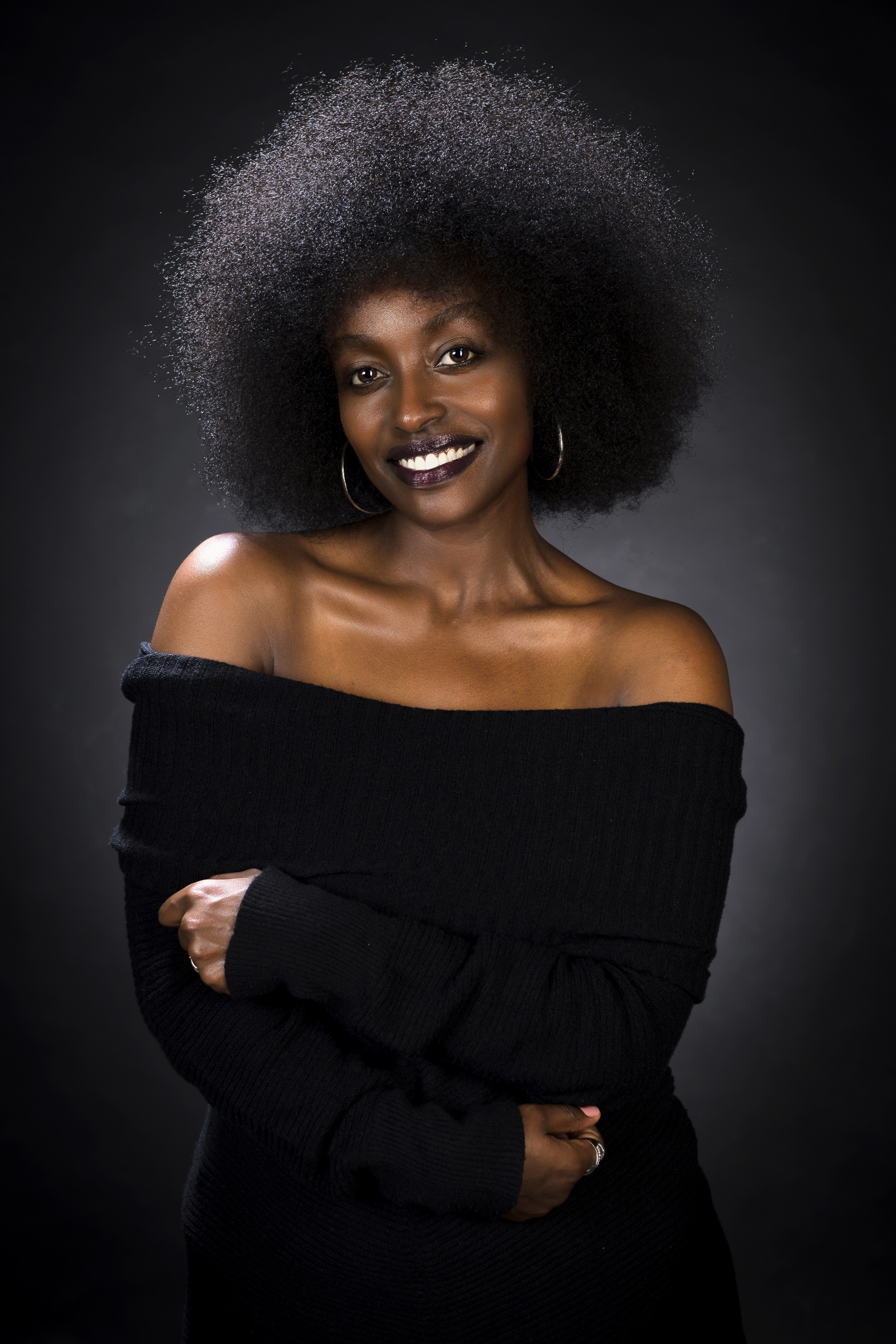
Ruth "Miss Shanel" Nirere Shanel, 2017

== U ==
- Eliane Umuhire born 1986 (age 38–39)
- Uwamahoro Antoinette born 25 December 1975 (age 49)
- Malaika Uwamahoro born 1990 (age 34–35)
- Nadege Uwamwezi born 1993 (age 31–32)
- Anisia Uzeyman born February 1975 (age 50)

== See also ==
- List of Rwandans
