= List of Rwandan writers =

This is a list of Rwandan writers.

Writer	Birth Year	Death Year	Brief Description	Notes
Amata Giramata	1996	Alive	Poet, feminist, writer and activist	
Maggy Correa			French-language autobiographical writer	
Immaculée Ilibagiza	1972	Alive	Autobiographical and religious writer	
Alexis Kagame	1912	1981	Priest, scholar and writer	
Fred Mfuranzima	1997	Alive	Rwandan writer, peace activist	
Eugénie Musayidire	1952	Alive	Writer of the German Mein Stein spricht (1999), covering the Rwandan genocide	
Yolande Mukagasana	1954	Alive	French-language autobiographical writer	
Joseph Ndwaniye	1962	Alive	Nurse, writer	
Cyprien Rugamba	1935	1994	Poet, composer and scholar	
Dorcy Rugamba	1969	Alive	Author, actor, dancer, and stage director	
Benjamin Sehene	1959	Alive	Novelist and non-fiction writer	
Marie Béatrice Umutesi	1959	Alive	Sociologist. French-language autobiographical writer	

== See also ==
- List of African writers by country
- List of Rwandans
