= Marie-Christine (given name) =

Marie-Christine is a given name. Notable people with the name include:

- Marie-Christine Adam (born 1950), French actress
- Marie-Christine Arnautu (born 1952), French Member of the European Parliament for the National Front
- Marie Christine of Austria, Duchess of Teschen (1742–1798), fifth child of Maria Theresa of Austria and Francis I, Holy Roman Emperor
- Marie-Christine Barrault (born 1944), French actress who has appeared in over forty feature films
- Princess Marie-Christine of Belgium (born 1951), member of the Belgian royal family
- Marie-Christine Bernard, Canadian educator and writer
- Marie Christine Björn (1763–1837), Danish ballerina and actor
- Marie-Christine Blandin (born 1952), member of the Senate of France, representing the Nord department
- Marie Christine of Savoy, Blessed (1812–1836), the first Queen consort of Ferdinand II of the Two Sicilies
- Marie Christine de Bourbon (1806–1878), Queen consort of Spain (1829 to 1833) and Regent of Spain (1833 to 1840)
- Marie-Christine Boutonnet (1949–2026), French politician
- Marie-Christine Brignole (1737–1813), the daughter of a Genovese nobleman
- Marie-Christine Calleja (born 1964), French tennis player
- Marie-Christine Cazier (born 1963), retired French sprinter, who specialized in the 200 meters
- Marie Christine Chilver (1920–2007), also known by the codename Agent Fifi, British secret agent in World War II
- Marie-Christine Dalloz (born 1958), member of the National Assembly of France
- Marie-Christine Damas (born 1966), French tennis player
- Marie-Christine Debourse (born 1951), French athletics competitor
- Marie-Christine Deurbroeck (born 1957), retired female long-distance runner from Belgium
- Marie-Christine Duroy (born 1957), French equestrian
- Marie-Christine Fillou (born 1961), French para table tennis player
- Marie-Christine Gasingirwa, Rwandan government official and scientist
- Marie-Christine Gerhardt (born 1997), German rower
- Marie-Christine Gessinger (1992–2010), Austrian fashion model who died in a car accident at the age of 17
- Marie Christine de Pardaillan de Gondrin (1663–1675), daughter of Françoise de Rochechouart de Mortemart and the Marquis of Montespan
- Marie Christine Anna Agnes Hedwig Ida (Princess Michael of Kent) (born 1945), member of the British royal family
- Marie-Christine Kessler (born 1940), French political scientist
- Marie Christine Kohler (1876–1943), member of the Kohler family of Wisconsin, well known for her philanthropic deeds
- Marie-Christine Koundja (born 1957), Chadian writer and diplomat
- Marie-Christine de Lalaing, daughter of Count Charles II of Lalaing and Marie de Montmorency-Nivelle
- Marie-Christine Lê-Huu, Canadian actress and playwright
- Marie Christine Felizitas of Leiningen-Dagsburg-Falkenburg-Heidesheim (1692–1734), German noblewoman member of the House of Leiningen
- Marie-Christine Lévesque (1958–2020), Canadian author
- Marie-Christine Lombard (born 1958), French business executive
- Marie-Christine Marghem (born 1963), Belgian politician
- Marie-Christine Rousset, French computer scientist
- Marie-Christine Roussy (born 1983), Canadian table tennis player
- Marie-Christine Schmidt (born 1986), Canadian sprint kayaker
- Marie Christine Schneider (1952–2011), French actress, known as Maria Schneider
- Marie-Christine Tschopp (born 1951), French footballer
- Marie-Christine Ventrillon (born 1949), French archer
- Marie-Christine Verdier-Jouclas (born 1965), French politician
- Marie-Christine Vergiat (born 1956), community organizations' activist and a French politician

== See also ==
- Marie Christine, a musical written by Michael John LaChiusa

Media related to Marie-Christine (given name) at Wikimedia Commons
