= Nshimiyimana =

Nshimiyimana is a surname. Notable people with the surname include:

- Eric Nshimiyimana (born 1972), Rwandan football coach
- Imran Nshimiyimana (born 1994), Rwandan footballer
- Venuste Nshimiyimana, Rwandan-born Belgian journalist
