= Murangwa =

Murangwa is a surname. Notable people with the surname include:

- Eric Eugène Murangwa (born 1975), Rwandan footballer
- Hadija Ndangiza Murangwa (born 1975), Rwandan politician
