= Fred Mfuranzima =

Rwandan writer (born 1997)

- Born: 1997 (age 28–29); Huye, Rwanda
- Citizenship: Rwandan
- Occupations: Artist, writer, poet, entrepreneur, peace activist
- Writing career
- Years active: 2017-Present
- Subjects: Poetry, history, memoirs, art therapy, Biographies, Research
- Notable works: The lonely soul, Ribrika, Beyond the borders of chuki.
- Notable awards: Global Citizen Emerging Creatives

Fred Mfuranzima (born 1997) is a Rwandan writer, artist, poet, and peace activist. He has written books in English and Kinyarwanda. In 2018 he founded Imfura Heritage Rwanda, a platform to promote Rwandan art, literature, and peace activism. His writings often depict the challenges and triumphs of individuals in post-genocide Rwanda. As a peace activist, Mfuranzima has been actively involved in various initiatives and campaigns aimed at promoting peace and reconciliation in Rwanda and the Great Lakes Region.

== Early life and education ==
Fred Mfuranzima was born in Huye, the southern part of Rwanda in 1997, but he grew up in the slums of Kigali from a family of people who had survived the genocide. The background of his family later sparked passion in him, that led him into playing a role in peace building and reconciliation using poetry, writing and arts.

He started writing as a young child in primary school. In high school, he wrote poems and stories for his classmates.

Mfuranzima has attended several writing courses and workshops, as well as various other learning activities.

== Career ==
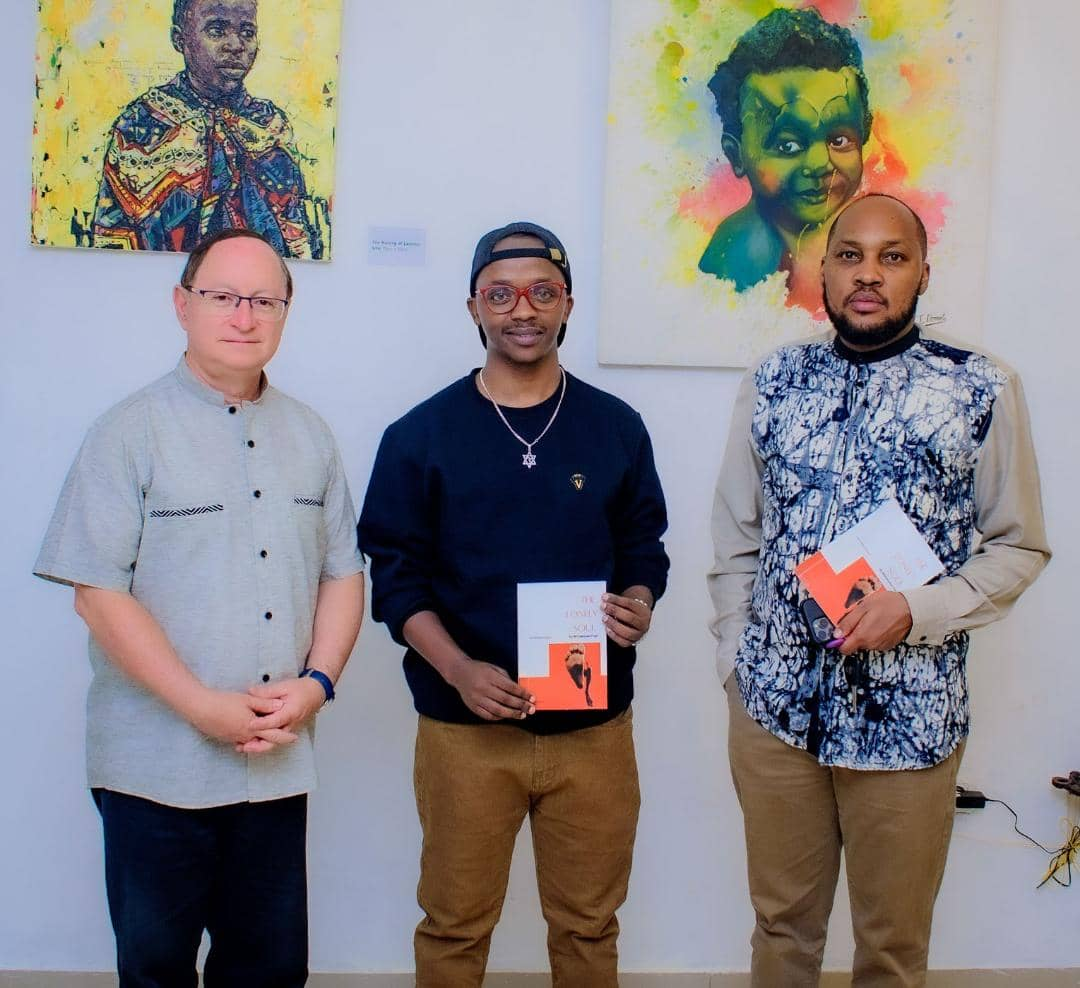
Mfuranzima with Ron Adam and Joseph Ryarasa

Before taking up writing as a career, Mfuranzima wanted to be a footballer, but an injury put an end to hopes of that career.

He published his first book, A letter from Tutsi hill, in 2017. He has written various books in English and Kinyarwanda, including: Child; Rwanda is poetry, The broken, Kuva ku gasozi Bututsi, Dreams to find another World, and A sister's left shoe, and The lonely soul. Many of his works explore the themes of identity, reconciliation, and the human experience, often depicting the challenges and triumphs of individuals in post-genocide Rwanda.

Mfuranzima has also written many poems, including "My Shame", "Never Again", "Endless Music", "In low Voice", "Confession", "Three Patriots", "Umwiza", "Full of Respect", and "African Dreamer".

He has said that works by authors such as Rwandan authors Tharicis Gatwa, Scholastique Mukasonga, Yolande Mukagasana, and others such as Oduor Jagero, Kae Tempest, and Shakespeare have inspired his writing.

== Other activities ==
As of 2021, Mfuranzima tutors in various places, including at American Corner Kigali and Kigali Public Library.

In 2018, he joined the Social Enterprises Academy to learn project development, planning and management, and applied for several different entrepreneurship classes. In 2019, he focused on peace building, and he joined Peace Building Institute, and doing short courses on conflicts management and initiatives.

In 2018 Mfuranzima founded the social enterprise Imfura Heritage Rwanda Ltd, that uses arts, literature, and intellectual skills to inspire a culture of peace and hope in the African Great Lakes Region. It also nurtures new talent through writing, music, poetry, and the visual arts, to help create a society of socially responsible people and peace activists. By 2021 Imfura had branches in Kanombe, Kiyovu, and Huye. He is also founder and director of Imfura Arts Center and Imfura Arts for Peace association.

He organizes an annual arts festival for peace titled Imfura Heritage Festival, which features different young artists from the region. He developed partnerships with the Israeli and Germany embassies in Rwanda, Kigali Public Library, the Delegation of the European Union to Rwanda, and various NGOs in Rwanda, including Never Again Rwanda.

He has also opened a publishing house, to make it easier for Rwandan authors to get published. He pays 75 per cent of the publishing costs and the authors pay 25 per cent.

At Kigali Genocide Memorial on Holocaust Remembrance Day on January 21, 2023, co-hosted by Aegis Trust, Mfuranzima read some of his poetry.

He performed a poem at a Move Africa concert in BK Arena.

Fred Mfuranzima at Move Africa Concert, Shared same stage with Kendrick Lamar, Zuchu, Bruce Melody, Ariel Ways and H.E Paul Kagame remarks.

== Selected works ==
=== Books ===
Fred Mfuranzima at Rwanda Broadcasting Agency, Versus Show

- A letter from Tutsi hill (2017)
- The Broken
- Child, Rwanda is Poetry
- A Sister's Left Shoe
- A Speech Demanding Future
- The lonely soul

=== Poems ===
- B Yom HaShoah
- Living behind a mask
- Enheritance
- My Shame
- Never Again
- Endless Music
- In low Voice
- Confession
- Three Patriots
- Umwiza
- Full of Respect
- African Dreamer
- Bless our Land
- Dreams of a lonely soul
- To forgive
- As I grow
- Rwanda, Future is yours
- Peace of mind
- The World will wake him up
- Neighbors women
- Where I come from
- Land of our forefathers

== See also ==
- List of peace activists
- List of Rwandan writers
