= FEANTSA =

European homelessness agency

FEANTSA, the European Federation of National Organisations working with the Homeless (French: Fédération Européenne d'Associations Nationales Travaillant avec les Sans-Abri), is the only major European network that focuses exclusively on homelessness at European level and receives financial support from the European Commission for the implementation of its activities. FEANTSA also works closely with other EU institutions, and has consultative status at the Council of Europe and the United Nations.

It monitors the scope and nature of homelessness in Europe, and national and local homeless policy-making in Europe in the framework of the European Commission's strategy on social protection and social inclusion. The organization's website offers information on the measurement of homelessness, health and homelessness, employment and homelessness, housing rights and homelessness, among others.

== FEANTSA Annual Themes ==
Each year, FEANTSA's Administrative Council designates a theme that will be woven into the work of FEANTSA for the coming twelve months. The concrete outcomes that FEANTSA produces on the annual theme are a policy statement, a report and a conference. In general, one of the editions of the FEANTSA magazine Homeless in Europe is also dedicated to the same issue.

== Research ==
FEANTSA established the European Observatory on Homelessness in 1991 to facilitate research to promote better understanding of the complexity and the changing nature of homelessness. This network is composed of eleven national research correspondents from different EU countries who have built up extensive experience in the field of homelessness and housing exclusion.

The Observatory produces the European Journal of Homelessness and the European Review of Statistics on Homelessness. The Journal provides a critical analysis of policy and practice on homelessness in Europe for policy makers, practitioners, researchers and academics. The aim is to stimulate debate on homelessness and housing exclusion at the European level and to facilitate the development of a stronger evidential base for policy development and innovation. The European Review of Statistics has two main objectives. First, it collates the development of ideas relating to the measurement of homelessness and housing exclusion in Europe that were presented in previous publications of the European Observatory on Homelessness. Second, it updates information on homelessness and housing exclusion for all those member states for which information is available.

The research outcomes of the Observatory have been put together in the European Journal of Homelessness since 2007. From 2002 - 2006, reports were produced under the following headings:

- European Statistics (2002–2006)
- Policies on Homelessness in Europe (2003–2006)
- Homelessness Research in the European Union (2002–2004)
- European Thematic Reports (2003–2006)

Between 1995 and 2004, transnational reports in book form, were published on a number of subjects:

- Immigration and Homelessness in Europe (2004)
- Access to Housing (2002)
- Women and Homelessness in Europe (2001)
- Support and Housing in Europe (2000)
- Services for Homeless People (1999)
- Coping with Homelessness (1999)
- Youth Homelessness in the European Union (1998)
- The Invisible Hand of the Housing Market (1996)
- Homelessness in the European Union (1995)

== Partnerships ==
FEANTSA works closely with the EU institutions, and has consultative status at the Council of Europe and at the United Nations. FEANTSA works closely with research networks such as the European Network on Housing Research. FEANTSA is a founding member of the European Housing Forum (a forum of European organisations active in the field of housing). FEANTSA is a member of the Platform of European Social NGOs, EAPN (European Anti Poverty Network) and EPHA (European Public Health Alliance).

In 2007, FEANTSA has won a case on the violation of right to housing in France before the European Committee of Social Rights, and one more case, against Slovenia, in 2010.

On 14 April 2010 at the European Parliament, Brussels FEANTSA launched a campaign called 'Ending Homelessness' with a hearing called 'Ending homelessness is possible! How can the EU effectively contribute to the fight against homelessness?' This event was co-organised by FEANTSA, Liz Lynne MEP, Britta Thomsen MEP, Karima Delli MEP, Ilda Figueiredo MEP, Jacek Protasiewicz MEP and Projekt Udenfor.

== Members ==
The some 100 member organisations of FEANTSA come from 30 European countries, including 24 Member States of the European Union. Members are non-governmental organisations that provide a wide range of services to people who are homeless including accommodation and social support. Most of the members of FEANTSA are national or regional umbrella organisations of service providers who work in close co-operation with public authorities, social housing providers and other relevant actors.

== Products ==
FEANTSA homeless service providers produce various European thematic reports, policy statements and policy proposals. The FEANTSA Observatory produces annual research in relation to homelessness (changing profiles, services, role of the state).

The FEANTSA magazine Homeless in Europe is published three times a year. Each issue deals with a particular theme that is topical in relation to homelessness across Europe. Contributors to the magazine include stakeholders, researchers, local authority representatives and experts from the EU institutions and other international bodies.

The FEANTSA Flash newsletter brings news from across Europe on issues related to housing and homelessness. News is gathered from FEANTSA members, the European institutions, International Organisations and the European press.

FEANTSA produces a number of tools and toolkits to help service users, researchers, local authorities etc., to better understand and tackle the problem of homelessness.

== Involvement in EU policy-making ==
FEANTSA mainly contributes to the following EU initiatives:

- Social protection and inclusion strategy
- Urban issues (Urban Audit, etc.)
- Employment strategy
- Services directives and debates
- Health strategy
- Housing Ministers meetings
