= Disability Support Europe =

- Disability Support Europe
- Founded: October 20 1996
- Headquarters: Brussels, Belgium
- Location: Belgium
- Key people: Kirsi Konola, President; Thomas Bignal, Secretary General

Disability Support Europe, (formerly the European Association of Service providers for Persons with Disabilities (abbreviated: EASPD), based in Brussels, Belgium, is an umbrella organisation that represents approximately 40,000 support services for persons with disabilities from 37 European countries at a European level.

== History ==
Disability Support Europe was founded as the European Association of Service Providers for Persons with Disabilities in 1996 with 5 partners. As the organisation began to grow, it held its first conference in 1999 in Dublin, Ireland, the topic being “Partnership— the key to quality services”. By 2001, Disability Support Europe represented 5,000 services, and had become a member of European NGOs Social Platform and ECAS (Euro Citizen Advice Service), and had signed cooperation agreements with IASSID and Inclusion Europe. Over the next 10 years, Disability Support Europe continued to grow, and until now has built a network that currently represents over 40,000 support services for persons with disabilities and their families all over Europe. The services represented cover the entire life cycle of the individual and include early intervention, education, employment, housing, leisure, culture, day-care, elder and residential support services.

In 2011 Disability Support Europe, together with Eurodiaconia, Workability Europe, EPR, Solidar, FEANTSA, CEDAG, Caritas (joined later), and the Red Cross (joined later) launched Social Services Europe, a European platform for not for profit providers of health and social services. In 2013 Disability Support Europe was accredited as NGO to the Conference of States Parties to the United Nations Convention on the Rights of Persons with Disabilities, and launched its first "Employment for All" Award. By 2015, Disability Support Europe represented over 12,000 service providers, became a member of EDF, and entered into a partnership with the Zero Project.

In 2016 Disability Support Europe moved its headquarters to Rue du Commerce, Handelsstraat in Brussels and elected James Crowe as president. In 2017, Disability Support Europe launched their second website, socialinvetment.eu, to help social service providers get better loans through the EU Investment Plan and the European Investment Bank. In January 2018, Disability Support Europe launched its new multiannual Strategy "Commit!" to support its work.

In 2024, Disability Support Europe once again transferred its headquarters, this time to Avenue des Nerivens, near its old location in Avenue d'Auderghem and elected its current President, Kirsi Konola.

In 2026 the organisation celebrated its 30th Anniversary, changed its name to Disability Support Europe and launched a new vision and mission statement.

== Logos ==
? – October 13 2021

October 13 2021 – October 5 2026

The first known EASPD logo consisted of the original name's acronym appearing in large blue capital letters with four bright yellow five-pointed stars arranged around and over the “PD” letters, extending above and below the text with a thick blue horizontal line stretching across most of the logo beneath the acronym and below the line, the tagline appears in bold, uppercase blue sans-serif text across two lines: “IMPROVING SERVICES” “IMPROVING LIVES”

The second known EASPD logo consisted of capital letters, set against four overlapping, semi-transparent, irregular quadrilateral and different coloured shapes.

- Blue: A wide, slightly tilted shape on the left, forming the background behind the letter “E.”
- Green: A slanted quadrilateral in the centre-left, extending diagonally downward and behind the letters “A” and part of “S.”
- Red: A tilted shape in the centre-right, positioned behind the letter “P.”
- Pink/magenta: A wide, slightly tilted shape on the right, serving as the background for the letter “D.”

== Disability Support Europe Presidents ==
- 1996 - 1997 Marie-Claire Rens of F.I.S.S.A.A.J Belgium
- 1997 - 1999 Roger Acton Director of Disability Federation Ireland
- 1999 - 2005 Luk Zelderloo of Tau-groep Belgium
- 2005 - 2008 Brian O'Donnell CEO of the National Federation of Voluntary Bodies Ireland
- 2008 - 2016 Franz Wolfmayr President of Steierische Behindertenhilfe Dachverband Austria
- 2016 - 2024 James Crowe, UK
- 2024 - Present Kirsi Konola Tukena, Finland
