= Iradukunda =

Iradukunda is a surname. Notable people with the surname include:

- Guy Orly Iradukunda (born 1996), Burundian tennis player
- Oceanne Iradukunda (born 1996), Rwandan-American actress
- Thiel Iradukunda (born 1999), Tanzanian footballer
