= Munyaneza =

Munyaneza can refer to:

- Charles Munyaneza, a Rwandan man currently living in Putnoe, near Bedford, England, also charged for genocide
- Désiré Munyaneza, a Rwandan man currently living Canada, convicted on charges of war crimes and crimes against humanity, for his role in the 1994 Rwandan Genocide
- Dorothée Munyaneza (born 1982), British-Rwandan singer, actress, dancer and choreographer.
- Henri Munyaneza, a football player from Rwanda
