= EPHA =

EPHA may refer to:

- European Public Health Alliance, a European non-profit association registered in Belgium
- Ephrin receptors (EPHA1-10), components of cell signalling pathways involved in animal growth and development
