= Sara Cerdas =

Portuguese politician

Sara Cerdas MEP
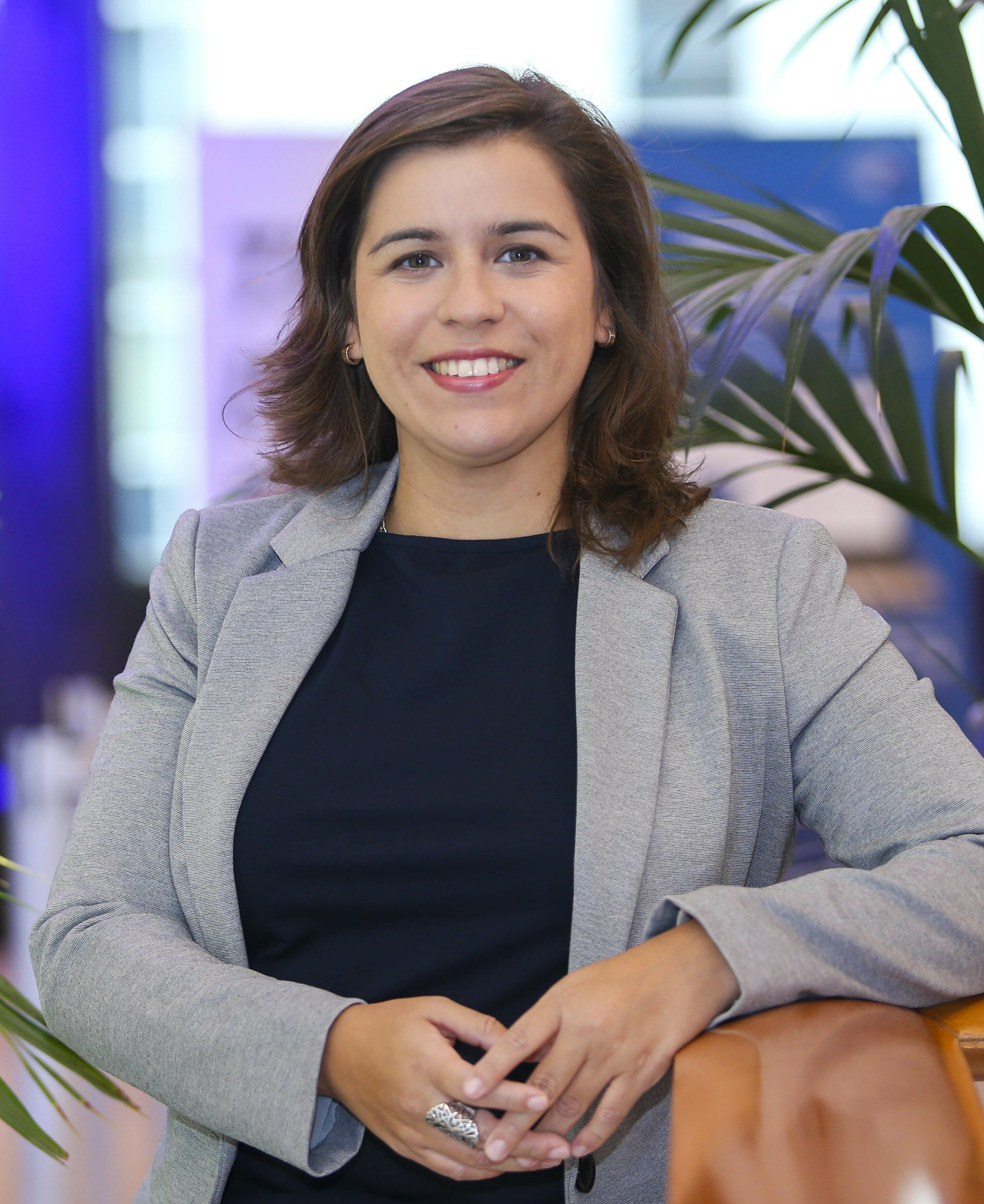

Member of the European Parliament for Portugal
- In office 2 July 2019 – 17 July 2024

Personal details
- Born: 23 March 1989 (age 37) Portugal
- Party: Socialist Party
- Education: University of Lisbon; University of Umeå

Sara Alexandra Rodrigues Cerdas (born 23 March 1989) is a Portuguese medical doctor and politician who served as a Member of the European Parliament for the Socialist Party between 2019 and 2024.

== Early life and career ==
Cerdas was born on 23 March 1989. Having grown up in Funchal, at Madeira Island, until the age of 18 Cerdas was a competition swimmer for Clube Naval do Funchal. She represented Portugal through the national youth team and achieved medals and records at the regional and national level.

Cerdas holds a master's degree in Medicine by the University of Lisbon, post-graduation in Travel Medicine by the NOVA University of Lisbon, a master's degree in Public Health Sciences by the University of Umeå and is a PhD student in Public Health Sciences at Stockholm University, Sweden.

During her student and professional path, Cerdas was elected for representative positions in the global health field, like the International Federation of Medical Students Association (IFMSA), National Association of Medical Students (ANEM) and Students Association of the Faculty of Medicine of Lisbon (AEFML).

== Political career ==
In parliament, Cerdas was a member of the Committee on the Environment, Public Health and Food Safety and co-chair in the European Parliament's Health Working Group. In this capacity, she serves as her parliamentary group's shadow rapporteur on the European Commission's EU4Health program. In 2022, she joined the Special Committee on the COVID-19 pandemic.

In addition to her committee assignments, Cerdas is part of the European Parliament Intergroup on LGBT Rights; the European Parliament Intergroup on Climate Change, Biodiversity and Sustainable Development, the European Parliament Intergroup on Seas, Rivers, Islands and Coastal Areas; the MEPs Against Cancer group; and the MEP Interest Group on Obesity & Health System Resilience.

== Other activities ==
- UNITE – Parliamentary Network to End HIV/AIDS, Viral Hepatitis and Other Infectious Diseases, Member (since 2021)

== Recognition ==
In December 2020, Cerdas received the Health award at The Parliament Magazine's annual MEP Awards.

In 2023, Cerdas was recognized as one of the 100 Influential Women in Oncology by OncoDaily.

In March 2024, Cerdas was one of twenty MEPs to be given a "Rising Star" award at The Parliament Magazine's annual MEP Awards
