= Amata Giramata =

Rwandan poet and activist

- Born: 29 January 1996 (age 30); Kigali
- Citizenship: Rwandan
- Education: DePauw University (Bachelor of Arts in Development Economics and Policy, Gender, Women and Sexuality Studies); University of Arizona (Doctor of Philosophy in Gender and Women's Studies) (Ongoing)
- Occupations: Poet, blogger, feminist, and community organizer
- Years active: 2014 — present
- Known for: Poetry, activism

Amata Inès Giramata (born 29 January 1996), is a Rwandan poet, blogger, feminist and community organizer. She is the founder and chief executive of Sistah Circle, "a black feminist and womanist grass roots community dedicated to black women's lives and narratives told through radical love and storytelling", as described by Giramata, herself.

== Background and education ==
Giramata was born in Rwanda on 29 January 1996. She is the first born in a family of four sisters and one brother. She attended La Colombiere School for her primary school training. She then transferred to Uganda, joining St. Mary's College Kitende, in Wakiso District. She completed her high school education at Green Hills Academy, in Kigali, Rwanda's capital city, in May 2013. She joined DePauw University, in the American state of Indiana, later the same year.

In 2017, she graduated from DePauw University with a Bachelor of Arts in Development Economics and Policy, Gender, Women and Sexuality Studies. As of August 2019, Giramata is pursuing a Doctor of Philosophy in Gender and Women's Studies from the University of Arizona in the United States.

== Career ==
Despite her young age, Giramata's public performing experience stretches back to 2014, at the age of 18 years when she performed at the 20th Commemoration of the 1994 Genocide Against the Tutsi in Washington DC, in the United States and at the 20th Liberation Day at Amahoro Stadium, in Kigali, Rwanda, in 2014. She also performed at the 2015 Rwanda Day in Atlanta, Georgia, United States. On 4 July 2019, she was the lead spoken word performer at the 25th Liberation Day Celebrations at Amahoro Stadium, in Kigali.

== Publications ==
- Journey of a 21st Century Queen As of 20 March 2019.

== See also ==
- List of Rwandan writers
