= Ishema Party =

Political party in Rwanda

Ishema Party is a Rwandan political movement founded by Thomas Nahimana and other young Rwandan activists and scholars, including Nadine Claire Kasinge, Chaste Gahunde, and Venant Nkurunziza. They met in Paris and for three days exchanged on issues facing Rwanda and possible consequences. Ultimately, they started a political party.

== Vision ==
The vision set by the founders is "promoting Democracy through the truth, intrepidness and social justice". They advocated non-violence and peace, based on dialogue and consensus upon the constructive initiatives to be implemented in a manner evenly beneficial to all the citizens. Every Umutaripfana should stand for truth, intrepidity, and social justice.

== History ==
Ishema was founded in Paris, France on 28 January 2013.

On 8 February 2014 Ishema convened its first Congress and decided to go back home and realise their program as described in their document "Together to Modernise Rwanda". The Congress nominated Thomas Nahimana as its presidential candidate in the elections of 2017.

However, Ishema leaders were denied entry by the Government of Rwanda.

After consultation with other members of Rwanda opposition in exile, members of Civil Society, and others, they founded a Government of Rwanda in Exile on 20 February 2017. Nahimana became president and Abdullah Akishuri became Prime Minister along with 12 other Cabinet Ministers.

Members of Ishema are called Abataripfana ("Brave people who can never stop saying the truth no matter what").

== leprophète.fr ==
Nahima and others created an online newspaper, leprophète.fr, to present their political views. The Rwandan government condemned the paper as dangerous.

== Thomas Nahimana ==
Thomas Nahimana was a priest in Cyangugu diocese, in southwestern Rwanda. He fled the country in 2005 and lives in France. He holds dual Rwandan and French citizenship.

Nahimana, in common with Victoire Ingabire Umuhoza and other opponents of the Rwandan Patriotic Front, was accused as a genocide denier from comments he made while abroad. He could face charges and years of imprisonment. Nahima briefly sought to join with the Democratic Forces for the Liberation of Rwanda (FDRL), but was rejected.

== 2017 presidential election ==
On January 22, 2017, Nahimana attempted to return to Rwanda to campaign. He would have become the sole opponent against Paul Kagame. Once again Nahimana was denied entry by the Rwandan Directorate of Immigration on the basis of a series of passport and visa issues.
