= Serrah Galos =

Rwandan photographer

Serrah Galos, 2022

Seraphin Nayituriki (born 1995) professionally known as Serrah Galos, is a Rwandan photographer.

Galos mostly photographs Rwandan people in rural areas. He has documented cultural and humanitarian subjects, including poverty, trauma, war, and internal displacement. His work has been associated with various non-governmental organisations in Rwanda, Ghana, the Democratic Republic of the Congo, and South Sudan, and he has worked for Africa New Life Ministries.

His work has been published in WIRED, Humanity Unified, and One UN. His photographs are regularly used on news outlets and other websites and magazines.

On 10 May 2023, Europe Day, an exhibition of Galos' photographs titled Happiness is in the Field was held at the residence of the EU Ambassador's residence in Lusaka, Zambia. The selected photographs illustrated the daily lives of smallholder farmers in the south of the country who are dealing with the effects of climate change. It was organised as part of the EU4MULIMI program, in which agriculture projects are funded by the EU.
