= Jean de Dieu Ntiruhungwa =

Rwandan politician

Jean de Dieu Ntiruhungwa is the former minister of the interior of Rwanda. He became minister of the interior in 2001. He was replaced by Christophe Bazivamo in 2004. Ntiruhungwa had been minister before he received that office.
