= Third Wedding =

- Film poster
- French: Troisièmes noces
- Directed by: David Lambert
- Written by: David Lambert
- Based on: Het derde huwelijk by Tom Lanoye
- Produced by: Lilian Eche; Anne-Marie Gélinas; Jean-Yves Roubin
- Starring: Bouli Lanners; Rachel Mwanza
- Cinematography: Jako Raybaut
- Edited by: Hélène Girard
- Production companies: Bidibul Productions; EMA Films; Frakas Productions
- Release date: 13 June 2018
- Running time: 98 minutes
- Countries: Belgium; Canada; Luxembourg
- Language: French

Third Wedding (French: Troisièmes noces) is a comedy-drama film, directed by David Lambert and released in 2018. A coproduction of companies from Belgium, Canada and Luxembourg, the film stars Bouli Lanners as Martin, a gay man grieving the recent death of his husband; in need of money to keep the house they shared, he decides to enter a marriage of convenience with Congolese immigrant Tamara (Rachel Mwanza) so that she can stay in the country, with the two unexpectedly falling into a sort of love as they try to convince the authorities that their relationship is real.

The cast also includes Jean-Luc Couchard, Virginie Hocq, Eric Kabongo, Nele Kestens, Catarina Reverendo, Lionël Ruzindana, Jean-Benoît Ugeux, Benoit Moureaux, André Pasquasy and Denis Simonetta.

The film was adapted from Tom Lanoye's 2006 novel Het derde huwelijk.
