= Armand Kajangwe =

Rwandan filmmaker

- Born: Armand Kajangwe; Rwanda
- Occupations: Director, producer, screenplay, editor
- Years active: 2009–present
- Notable work: The Asylum, Dirty Singles

Armand Kajangwe, is a Rwandan–Swiss filmmaker. He is best known as the director of critically acclaim films The Asylum , and Dirty Singles.

== Career ==
On April 7, 2009, Kajangwe joined a full service production company called 'Crooked Seas Inc.' founded by Craig Leblanc which is based in Ontario, Canada. He worked as the director, director of photography, and social media manager of the company.

In 2016, Kajangwe was involved in the launch of Africa's first video streaming site. The platform is known as 'www.journal.rw' which was developed and run by Innovation Village, a Rwanda-based creative firm where Kajangwe is the executive director. The platform provides an avenue to share high definition video content.

== Filmography ==
Year	Film	Role	Genre	Ref.
2010	The Asylum	Editor, screenplay, producer	Documentary	
2013	A Song for Torah Jane	second assistant camera operator	Documentary	
