= Kate Bashabe =

Rwandan socialite

- Catherine Bashabe
- Born: September 11, 1990 (age 36); Gasabo District, Rwanda
- Occupations: Entrepreneur, philanthropist
- Years active: 2010–present
- Known for: Founder of Kabash Fashion House and Kabash Cares
- Title: CEO of Kabash Fashion House
- Awards: Miss MTN 2010; Miss Nyarugenge 2012

Kate Bashabe (born 11 September 1990) is a Rwandan entrepreneur and philanthropist known as the founder of the Kabash brand and the Kabash Cares charity organization. She is recognized for her contributions to Rwanda’s fashion industry and her efforts in supporting underprivileged communities.

== Early life and career ==
In 2010, Kate Bashabe won miss MTN pageant and also became an ambassador for MTN Rwanda in the same year. While completing her high school education, she was also juggling outsourcing her protocol services to several companies such as MTN, FERWACY and corporate events. In 2011, Bashabe became the country sales and marketing manager at RAK porcelain. after working for RAK porcelain for almost two years in 2012, she started her own imports company, where she imported goods such as cars, clothes, home supplies on behalf of customers. A few months later, she decided to follow her childhood dreams in fashion and opened Kabash Fashion House. In 2013, she expanded and put up a second business where she focused on interior design, African craft and artwork, all under the Kabash label. Bashabe was invited to take part in an international exhibition event in the United States in 2016 by the Rwandan government as to promote Kabash brands overseas and expand her customer base.

== Philanthropy ==
After achieving success in her career, Bashabe decided to give back to her community. In 2017, she organized a charity event where local artists performed live going to fund impoverished children in Rwanda. The funds collected during the initiative were directed into supporting over 500 young Rwandan students. She then set up Kabash Cares in 2018. Kabash Cares is an initiative that sponsors needy students financially and materially.

Bashabe has also been involved in various social impact projects, including working with different organizations to promote youth empowerment and entrepreneurship in Rwanda. Her philanthropic efforts have been recognized by local media, highlighting her contributions to social development. She has emphasized that philanthropy is not just for the wealthy but a duty for all those who have the ability to help others.

== Personal Life and Achievements ==
Kate Bashabe has gained attention for her business and luxurious lifestyle. She has invested in real estate and in 2024 completed the construction of a high-end residence in Rebero, Kigali, which has been widely featured in local media. Her home has been compared to other notable Rwandan celebrities' residences, drawing admiration and debate on social media.
