= Urwibutso Nicole =

Rwanda basketball player

Urwibutso Nicole (born 1994) is a basketball player from Rwanda.

== Early life ==
Nicole was born in Gasabo District in 1994, the youngest in a family of three. She had a daughter with her husband who grew up dreaming of sports and science. Nicole stepped down and immediately won the league title from Kigali, beating APR WBBC. In 2019 she returned to the University of Rwanda team in Huye where she was studying and was also in charge of university sports development. As soon as Nicole graduated from college in 2020 she returned to the IPRC HUYE team.

== Career ==
She started playing a variety of sports at her school, but settled on basketball. She participated in school competitions such as the Ecole Notre Dame de la Providence Karubanda. Nicole became the captain of her team in 2018. The team immediately won the league title from Kigali, beating APR WBBC. In 2019 she returned to the University of Rwanda team in Huye where she was studying and was also in charge of sports development at the university (Minister of Sports). As soon as Nicole graduated from college in 2020 she returned to the IPRC HUYE team.
