= Lynder Nkuranga =

Rwandan police official

Lynder Nkuranga (born 1982) is a Rwandan police official. She serves as Assistant Commissioner of Police and Director General of Immigration and Emigration of the republic of Rwanda.

== Career ==
Lynder Nkuranga is the first woman to become director of Rwandan intelligence. President Paul Kagame nominated her, breaking a longstanding taboo. The heads of the national intelligence and security services had always been occupied by the military. Nkuranga replaced Colonel Anaclet Kalibata.

She holds a master's degree in peace and conflict studies and attended a course at the Musanze police academy. She served in the Rwanda National Police for over ten years. Prior to joining the Secret Service, she served as Commissioner for Cooperation and Protocol and was the only woman in the police command structure consisting of 36 senior officers. She is the second woman to rise so high in the ranks of law enforcement. The first was Mary Gahonzie, who led the police, who was a deputy general commissioner, then an acting general commissioner in 2009 and lastly a prison commissioner, in 2010.
