= Étienne Nzabonimana =

Rwandan businessman convicted for his role in the Rwandan genocide

- Born: 1950 (age 75–76); Rwanda
- Relatives: Samuel Ndashyikirwa (half-brother)
- Allegiance: Kibungo Club (alleged)
- Criminal charges: Aiding Hutu militia during genocide

Étienne Nzabonimana (born 1950), formerly a small businessman in Kirwa, Rwanda, was convicted in Belgium on June 29, 2005 for his role in the Rwandan genocide of 1994. Specifically, eyewitnesses argued that he was a leader of the Kibungo Club, which was allegedly planning the genocide in advance, and that he had overseen certain massacres in the Kibungo region. Prosecutors argued that he and his half-brother, Samuel Ndashyikirwa, provided vehicles to Rwandan soldiers along with weapons and beer. Found guilty of aiding Hutu militias in killing 50,000 Tutsis and moderate Hutus, he will serve 12 years in prison, while his half-brother will serve ten.
