= Gabriel Gabiro =

Rwandan journalist (born 1981)

Gabriel Gabiro (born January 21, 1981), is a Rwandan journalist who has reported for several leading international news organizations including the Associated Press (AP), Agence France-Presse (AFP) and Time magazine.

Gabiro's first full-time employment for an international news agency was at age 19 with the Swiss- based Hirondelle News Agency as its reporter at the UN International Criminal Tribunal for Rwanda (ICTR) in Arusha, Tanzania.

He has also appeared on various international media including the BBC One, BBC World, RFI and Al-jazeera as a commentator on human rights and development stories related to Rwanda and the Great Lakes region of Africa.

He has reported from Rwanda, Tanzania, Burundi, Kenya, Denmark and the Democratic Republic of Congo.
