= Saphine Kirenga =

Rwandan actress

- Born: Saphine Kirenga; 25 September; Rwanda
- Occupation: Actress
- Years active: 2010–present
- Spouse: Sebera Eric (2015)

Saphine Kirenga (born 25 September) is a Rwandan film actress. One of the most popular actresses in Rwanda Television (RTV), she has appeared in films such as The Chains of Love, Dreams, Sakabaka, Rwasibo, Seburikoko, Urugamba and The Secret of Happiness. She is also a nurse by profession.

== Personal life ==
Saphine was born in Rwanda. Her mother is also a popular Rwandan film actress.

She was engaged to popular musician Sebera Eric. Sebera was the manager of Rafiki Coga in 2007 and 2008. However, after few months, the relationship was broken and Sebera started dating Uwineza Ruburika Nicole.

== Career ==
In 2017, she acted in the television series Mutoni and then in Sakabaka. After the success in the series, she was selected for the short film The Secret of Happiness where Saphine featured the role 'Eva'. In 2016, she won the award for the Best Actress 2016.

In 2019, she made the film Shady Commitment which won the award for the best Feature Film at the inaugural Rwanda International Movie Awards (RIMA) in March 2020. At the ceremony, Saphine was also adjudged Best Actress of the Year for her role in Shady Commitment.

== Filmography ==
Year	Film	Role	Genre	Ref.
2014	Sakabaka	Actress	TV series	
2014	Rwasibo	Actress	TV series	
2015	Seburikoko	Actress	Film	
2016	Mutoni	Actress	TV series	
	The Chains of Love	Actress	Film	
	Dreams	Actress	Film	
	Urugamba	Actress	Film	
2017	The Secret of Happiness	Actress: Eva, executive producer	Short film	
2019	Bambi	Actress	Film	
