= Epiphanie Mukashyaka =

Rwandan businesswoman

- Born: 1959 or 1960 (age 66–67); Rwanda
- Occupations: Businesswoman, coffee producer
- Known for: First woman to produce specialty coffee in Rwanda
- Title: Founder of Bufcoffee
- Spouse: (deceased 1994)
- Children: 8
- Awards: Golden Cup Rwandan Coffee Award (2007); Rwandan Woman Entrepreneur of the Year (2019)

Epiphanie Mukashyaka (born c. 1959–1960) is a Rwandan businesswoman. She is the founder of Bufcoffee and the first woman producing specialty coffee in Rwanda.

== Early life ==
Mukashyaka was born in 1959 or 1960 in Rwanda. She was educated for 6 years and married at the age of 17. She had 8 children.

At the time in pre-genocide Rwanda, women were not allowed to inherit land, and it was virtually impossible to run a business. By the end of the Rwandan genocide, about 70% of the population was female and about 30% male.

== Rwandan Genocide and creation of Bufcoffee ==
In 1994, the Rwandan Genocide occurred, resulting in the death of hundreds of thousands, including many of Mukashyaka's family members, such as her husband and one of her children. This left the Mukashyaka jobless and without any financial support. She was initially unable to inherit her husband's land but soon took control of it. She also received support from fellow widows in the community, including Ngara Nyarusiza, who later became a partner in the Bufcoffee business.

After the genocide, Mukashyaka took a 54 million Rwandan franc loan and built a coffee washing facility in Gikongoro called "Nyarusiza", the first owned by a woman in Rwanda, where she employed farmers to grow the beans. During the reconstruction of her coffee plantation, she received help from the USAID and PEARL. In 2004 her coffee was judged positively by Kenneth Davids. and in 2007, she opened a second coffee washing facility called "Remera"., In the same year she won the 2007 Golden Cup Rwandan coffee award, and the Rwandan Cup of Excellence award for coffee in 2008, 2010, 2011, 2013, and 2014.

In 2016, the company had over 4,000 shareholders, and coffee exported at a premium to America.

In 2019, Mukashyaka was selected as the Rwandan Woman entrepreneur of the Year, winning 2 million Rwandan francs. She also got a partnership deal with Trademark East Africa.

=== Covid-19 pandemic ===
At some point between 2016 and 2020 the company owned four washing facilities. When the COVID-19 pandemic in Rwanda hit, business dropped slightly. By 2020, the company had about 12,000 workers, a decline from the previous year. Some had to give up working as coffee farmers due to the pandemic, which resulted in lower production, although business was still steady and safe. Payments methods had to be switched to online due to social distancing rules.

== Personal life ==
Mukashyaka's children work for the company. One is the managing director of Bufcoffee.

Mukashyaka built a community garden beside Umumvumu Kindergarten School to sustain better food security during the pandemic.
