= Mignone Alice Kabera =

Rwandan woman

Mignone Alice Kabera is a Rwandan woman who is also a philanthropist, and for the very first time in Rwanda, she was assigned a title of Apostle. She is the Founder and leader of Women foundation Ministries and Noble Family Church but WFM is an association that focuses on developing Rwandan women in the areas of spirituality and the issues they face in their daily lives, including in the home, at work and beyond.

== WFM Projects ==
Women foundation ministries has a lots of project conducted every year among these there is Thanks giving event this happened in Gasabo district Nduba sector

== Connect Conferences ==
Apostle Alice Kabera also organizes connect conferences in different parts of the world 2023 in US Maine, Italy and in Germany in 2024, where she meet all the diaspora communities most of them are Rwandans and Burundian and east Africans in general, for the purposes of spreading the good news

== Philanthropy ==
in partnership with the district of Gasabo this was more of charity as well as participating in local sustainable development of vulnerable communities in Rwanda.

The government of Rwanda encourages Institutions to create more opportunities  for local citizens, by serving people whose lives are really endangered because of poverty as well as malnutrition. In that case Women Foundation Ministries started a well received  initiative  of supporting communities on large scales every year to eradicate poverty and malnutrition.[3]

They provided 17 000 000 Rwandan francs to support district activities and also the offered food, clothing, schools materials, life insurance of about 10 000 000 Rwandan Francs. all these they do every year is to empower families through women

== Awards ==
Apostle Alice Mignonne Kabera has received many rewards. Among them is the recognition she received from Grooe due to her outstanding contribution to gospel music and media, as well as, the Sifa Award for compassionate work, which is organized every year in the name of "Thanksgiving". She organizes many events throughout the year to empower women in Rwandan society, such as "All Women Together" with the theme "From Victims to Champions". All Women Together is a huge conference which brings all women in each and every country where the foundation reaches, and they celebrate all the projects, activities and impact being created by women in their respective countries and families.

She also organizes events to help couples in their marriages, including the "Couples Dinner" event.
