= Samuel Ndashyikirwa =

Samuel Ndashyikirwa, formerly a small businessman in Kirwa, Rwanda, was convicted in Belgium on June 29, 2005 for his role in the Rwandan genocide of 1994. Eyewitnesses testified that he had been present at massacres in Kirwa and had been directly involved with the killings, and prosecutors argued that he and his half-brother, Etienne Nzabonimana, provided vehicles, weapons, and beer for Rwandan soldiers committing genocide in the Kibungo region. Both were convicted of aiding Hutu militias in killing 50,000 Tutsis and moderate Hutus. Ndashyikirwa will serve ten years in prison, while his half-brother will serve twelve.

== Sources ==
- TRIAL (TRack Impunity ALways), Geneva, Switzerland Samuel Ndashyikirwa's trial.
- BBC News, "Two Rwandans guilty over genocide." June 29, 2005
