= Sostene Munyurabatware =

Rwandan person who helped genocide victims escape

Sosthéne Munyurabatware
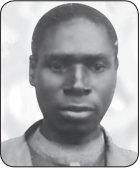
- Born: 1947 Kanama Commune, Gisenyi Prefecture
- Died: 15 May 1994 Mirambi Centre
- Resting place: Musasa Genocide Memorial
- Language: Kinyarwanda
- Spouse: Belia Mukamusoni (Died July 1994, returning from Zaire)
- Children: 8 Children

Sosthéne Munyurabatware (born 1947, died 15 May 1994) was a Rwandan man who saved a number of Tutsis from being killed by Hutu militias during the 1994 Rwandan genocide. Trusted in his area, he helped several Tutsis cross the border to the Republic of the Congo (DRC). He was killed while returning from the DRC where Interahamwe led by a cell leader called Halindintwali Jean had killed him and his cousin Leopold Munyakayanza. In 2016, he was one of the 17 Rwandese selected at national level who were recognized for their deeds of humanity during the Rwandan Genocide of 1994.

== Early life ==
Sostene was born to Land-owner Ngirumpatse and mother Malita Kangeyo. Sostene was born on the shores of the lake like his cousin Leopold Munyakayanza. They were both known to be trusted in their area and they were close friends in the way that they always discussed before doing something. It was also known that Sostene had a prayer room in his home and was a devoted Christian.

== 1994 genocide ==
During the genocide against the Tutsi in 1994, he had a boat in Lake Kivu. Many Tutsi went to him in search of help to cross to the Democratic Republic of the Congo (DRC). He first took his two Tutsi women and some of his neighbours among others Gatete and Forodo. It is reported that Sostène and his younger cousin Leopold Munyakayanza helped many people to cross because on the second time Sostène took 52 people while Leopold took 47. One day, when he was coming back from DRC, Interahamwe led by a cell leader called Harindintwali Jean arrested him at the lake and took him to Mirambi Centre and beat him until he became unconscious. They buried him alive in a nearby pit. He was killed with his cousin, it was said to have been on the 15th of May 1994. They were exhumed and buried in dignity in a genocide memorial site.

His wife Belia passed away while returning from Zaire.

== Leopold Munyakaynza ==
Born in 1952 to father Nsekanabo and mother Nyiramondo, Munyakayanza Léopopld used to go to buy things in DRC on boat before 1994. During the genocide he helped many Tutsi cross the lake to DRC. Like Sostène, Leopold also was victim of his humanitarian deeds when he was trying to save some Tutsis during the Genocide. He took them to Idjwi island in his boat.

Since the beginning of the Liberation War in 1990, the Tutsis sought refuge to Leopold Munyakayanza or his cousin Munyurabatware Sostène whenever they were attacked. When the genocide broke out in 1994, many Tutsi sought refuge in their families. Together, they planned how they could save the people pursued by the interahamwe. Some Tutsi heard that they were taking people to Idjwi island and many Tutsi from Rutsiro District and Karongi District went to them. When they were helping them to cross, the interahamwe broke their boat and they used the boat of another person and helped other Tutsis to cross. They saved many lives and they are praised for it. Leopold was killed at the fourth crossing and he was killed with his cousin Sostène who was coming back from Idjwi to drop the refugees. They were killed at Mirambi Centre and buried alive.

Leopold married Annonciata Nyinawankusi, they had 6 children.
