= Thomas Nahimana =

Thomas Nahimana (born in 1971), is a Catholic priest, Rwandan Opposition leader and current President of Rwandan Opposition Coalition for Democratic Change (ROC) He is the founder of the Ishema Party, and a key figure in the opposition to President Paul Kagame. Thomas Nahimana is also the leader of the "New Generation", a movement that seeks change and democracy in Rwanda using nonviolent methods.

== Early life ==
Nahimana was born to a Hutu father and a Tutsi mother. He studied in Rwanda and France and held doctorant degrees in Law, Philosophy and Theology. He attended seminary first in Nyundo, then in Nyakibanda and was ordained a Catholic priest on July 18, 1999. He served as a priest in Nyamasheke District, Hanika, and Muyange. He taught at Saint Aloys Junior Seminary of Cyangugu, and he was the President of the diocesan Just and Peace Commission in Nyamasheke, Cyangugu, from 1999 to 2005.

== Exile and political career ==
He has been living in exile in France since 2005 in fear for his safety. Nahimana holds dual Rwandan and French citizenship.

=== Criticism ===
Numerous media outlets loyal to the current Government of Rwanda, led by Kagame, alleged that he had fled the country after embezzling money from a microfinance group. However, the Cyangugu Catholic Church Bishop considered that information completely false and fabricated, a result of a smear campaign against Father Thomas Nahimana, as an Opposition Leader.

In 2011, the Catholic Church in Rwanda, under the pressure of the current Rwandan Government, distanced its organization from Nahimana and Fortunatus Rudakemwa upon the proclamation of Bishop Jean Damascene Bimenyimana of Cyangugu Diocese for "instigating divisionism and promoting genocide ideology". Not only that but some members of the Rwandan Patriotic Front, the ruling political party in Rwanda, which is led by Rwanda's current President Paul Kagame, have accused father Nahimana of being a genocide denier, from comments he has made while abroad, a serious charge that carries years of imprisonment if one is convicted. The current government of Rwanda has not charged the father of any wrongdoing.

=== 2017 election ===
In November 2016, Nahimana Thomas and his close aids (Candidate Campaign Manager Venant Nkurunziza and Candidate Principal Spokesperson Claire Nadine Kansinge, along with the latter's seven-month-old baby Kejo Skyler) attempted to return to Rwanda to partake in the upcoming 2017 presidential election but were refused entry into Rwanda by Paul Kagame's government. They arrived in Kenya, where they were informed that they could not board Kenyan Airways and complete the last leg of their trip because Kigali did not want them on Rwandan soil. On January 22, 2017, Nahimana attempted to return to Rwanda to run for the Presidency in the August 2017 elections. Once again Nahimana was denied entry to Rwanda by the Rwandan Directorate of Immigration on the basis of a series of complex passport and visa issues.
