= Enos Kagaba =

Rwandan businessman (born 1954)

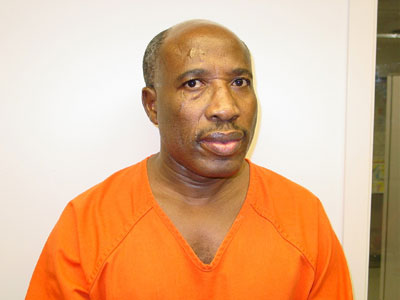
- Born: Enos Iragaba Kagaba; 1954 (age 71–72); Gisovu Commune, Kibuye Prefecture, Rwanda
- Occupation: Businessman
- Conviction: Crime against humanity
- Penalty: Life imprisonment

Details
- Date apprehended: February 2001
- Imprisoned at: Nyarugenge Prison

Enos Iragaba Kagaba (born 1954, Kibuye Prefecture) is a Rwandan businessman who, in 2001, was arrested at the Minneapolis-Saint Paul International Airport when he attempted to gain entry into the United States.

== Arrest and Gacaca courts ==
He was initially charged with fraud and attempting to enter the country under a false identity. Once the Immigration and Customs Enforcement's Human Rights Violators and Public Safety Unit (HRVPSU) became aware that Rwanda had issued an international arrest warrant against Kagaba for actions of genocide during the 1994 war in Rwanda, genocide charges were also added. A removal order was then issued.

This was the first incidence in the United States of a removal order for the accusation of genocide. The United States used 18 U.S.C. §2340a to establish jurisdiction over Kagaba. This statute granted jurisdiction over an alleged offender if he a) is a national of the United States OR b) is present in the United States (regardless of whether he or the victim(s) are/were U.S. nationals).

In October 2011 he was sentenced to life imprisonment for his important role in the Rwandan genocide.

== COVID-19 pandemic ==
In March 2021, he and the others were vaccinated, and Kagaba showed his gratitude to the government, thanking it for thinking about them.
