= European Public Health Alliance =

- Abbreviation: EPHA
- Formation: 1993
- Headquarters: Rue de Trèves 49–51, 1040 Brussels, Belgium
- Official language: English
- Director General: Dr Milka Sokolović (2021)
- President: Elisabeth Dupont (2026)
- Website: epha.org

The European Public Health Alliance (EPHA) is a Brussels-based European non-profit organisation that advocates for improved public health and health equity across Europe. Founded in 1993, EPHA brings together a coalition of civil society and non-governmental organisations active in public health, including national associations and European-level federations.

The alliance engages in policy dialogue with European Union institutions, the World Health Organization and other international bodies, with a focus on reducing health inequities and promoting evidence-informed policy making.

EPHA leads or co-hosts several thematic networks, including on antimicrobial resistance and health equity, and contributes to EU policy processes across areas such as commercial determinants of health, antimicrobial resistance, environmental health, and discussions around public health funding.

== History and structure ==
EPHA was established on 12 September 1993, during the period when the Maastricht Treaty was nearing final ratification. This treaty introduced for the first time a legal basis for the European Community to contribute to public health protection under its Article 129. This role would be further expanded by the Amsterdam Treaty in 1997, whose article 152 broadened the EU's public health mandate to include health promotion alongside protection.

An international non-profit organisation (NL: IVZW, FR: AISBL) under Belgian law, EPHA is governed by two governing bodies, the General Assembly and the Management Board, both chaired by the President. The General Assembly approves the Statutes, decides on the strategy of EPHA proposed by the Management Board, and approves the objectives and priorities. As of April 2021 the organisation is led by the Director General, Dr Milka Sokolović. The board, which consists of elected EPHA members, has the highest governing authority, and as of June 2026 is led by Elisabeth Dupont.

In July 2025, EPHA's membership included 47 organisations from 21 Countries in the WHO European Region, including both national associations and European federations.

== Mission ==
In its own words, EPHA's mission is to bring together the public health community, to provide thought leadership and facilitate change, to build public health capacity, to deliver equitable solutions to European public health challenges, to improve health and reduce health inequities. The alliance's aim is to collate the perspectives from the many sectors its members represent and contribute them to European policy dialogues.

== Engagement and Partnerships ==
EPHA has worked in partnership with a number of national and international institutions and organisations, and has signed memoranda of understanding to formalise some of those partnerships, including with:

- World Health Organization – Regional office for Europe (WHO-Europe)
- World Health Organization – Civil Society Commission
- South-East Europe Health Network (SEEHN)
- Colegio Medico de Chile
- OpenCom
- Institute of Public Health Montenegro

The alliance is further a member of the Health and Environment Alliance (HEAL) and the World Federation of Public Health Associations (WFPHA). It also (co)hosts, among which the EU4Health Civil Society Alliance co-hosted with the European Patients' Forum, a number of internal networks, and thematic networks on the European Union's Health Policy Platform.

== Advocacy Areas ==
The European Public Health Alliance's work has spanned multiple thematic areas addressing the determinants of health. This focus, as well as EPHA's role in public interest representation has informed work in specific advocacy areas, including:

- Antimicrobial resistance
- Commercial determinants of health
- Environment and health
- Health systems and universal access
- Health equity
- Public health funding and civil society space

== Allegations ==
According to Politico reporting, in February 2024 an anonymous letter allegedly from ex EPHA employees was circulated, with claims against the alliance's management including harassment, intimidation, bullying, toxic work culture and nepotism . EPHA's board promptly ordered an external investigation through an independent law firm, Thales. The ensuing governance crisis led to several board members and advisors resigning; some cited the controversy, one cited a lack of confidence in the external investigation, and others provided unrelated reasons or refused to comment. Thales rejected claims made against its "ethical and professional standards". In parallel, a separate harassment complaint was received by external health service Mensura against one of the board members who then stepped down.

In March 2024, the investigation was concluded. The EPHA President communicated it had found "no evidence of discrimination or harassment", with the full report accessible only to the three remaining board members. In June 2024, the newly elected EPHA board issued a statement. It acknowledged some of the past issues and announced measures in response, including "demonstrating keen support and trust in all of the team". In June 2025, EPHA's past and current leadership publicly communicated their reflection on the crisis, reconfirming their opinion that there was "no evidence of wrongdoing on any of the points identified as important by the Board".

== See also ==
- Health care
- Directorate-General for Health and Consumer Protection
- EU4Health
