= European Anti Poverty Network =

The European Anti-Poverty Network (EAPN) is the largest European network of national, regional and local networks, involving anti-poverty non-governmental organisations (NGOs) and grass-root groups as well as European organisations, active in the fight against poverty and social exclusion. It was established in 1990.

Supported by the European Commission, EAPN is a network of 31 National Networks of voluntary organisations and grass-root groups active in the fight against poverty within the 27 European Union member states (minus Slovenia), as well as in Norway, Iceland, Serbia, and North Macedonia. EAPN's membership also includes 13 European organisations. EAPN has a consultative status with the Council of Europe and is a founding member of the Platform of European Social NGOs.

== Core objectives ==
- To promote and enhance the effectiveness of actions to eradicate poverty and prevent social exclusion;
- To raise awareness of poverty and social exclusion
- To empower the people living in poverty and social exclusion
- To lobby for and with people and groups facing poverty and social exclusion.

EAPN includes the objectives of gender equality and non discrimination in all its areas of work.

=== Activities ===
To address its objectives, the EAPN lobbies European and national decision-making institutions to develop and implement inclusive, anti-poverty policies and programmes, and keeps under close review policies and programmes likely to impact on groups facing poverty and social exclusion.

It also acts as a central European forum for anti poverty focused NGOs, exchanging information on EU and national level anti poverty and exclusion policies; it supports members in exchanging experiences and building partnerships; and provides training for its members. It is also forging links and alliances with like-minded groups and coalitions.

=== Resources ===
The EAPN website gives access to key EAPN and EU documents on poverty, social exclusion and inequalities. EAPN produces wide a range of materials and publications on poverty, social inclusion, social protection, employment, Structural Funds.
