= Teta Diana =

- Born: Diana Teta; May 5, 1992 (age 34); Nairobi, Kenya
- Occupations: Singer, Music Composer
- Years active: 2013-present

Teta Diana is a musician from Kigali, Rwanda, born in 1992 in Nairobi, Kenya. She is active as a songwriter and performer of traditional and modern music. She blends Kinyarwanda with English and Swahili and frames her work around cultural storytelling.

== Biography ==
=== Early life and Childhood ===
Teta lived in Uganda and Kenya until she returned to Rwanda in 1995. Teta began liking music and wrote her first song at the age of eleven and her initial career started in 2009 when she came top three in a singing competition organized by a German group. She speaks Kinyarwanda, Swahili and English.

=== Career ===
This let her record 2 songs before entering the Tusker Project Fame 5 in Nairobi, Kenya. In 2013, she made the decision to do music full-time. Her collaboration with Urban Boys on ‘Fatafata’ made her gain popularity.
