= Nadege Uwamwezi =

Rwandan actress (born 1993)

- Born: Nadege Uwamwezi; 1993 (age 32–33)
- Other names: Queen Nadege
- Occupations: Actress, fashion designer
- Years active: 2014–present
- Children: Ganza Benny Lucky

Nadege Uwamwezi (born 1993), is a Rwandan actress. One of the most popular actresses in Rwandan television, Nadege is best known for the role 'Nana' in TV series, City Maid. Apart from acting, she is also a singer and fashion designer.

== Personal life ==
Uwanmwezi was born in 1993 in Rwanda.

She opened a boutique named 'Nana Fashion Shop' with her brand name. She had one son from her first marriage, Ganza Benny Lucky.

== Career ==
Prior to acting, Nadege was a singer who sung under the name 'Queen Nadege'. She was part of a band called 'The Queens' where they sung the 'Ryajambo' in 2009.

She joined Kwetu Film Institute to study drama. Later, she was introduced to acting by Kennedy Mazimpaka, after he noticed her acting skills at Kwetu. Mazimpaka gave her a minor role in the film Rwasibo, which became her maiden cinema acting role. In 2016, she acted in the television serial Mutoni as the titular lead role.

Nadege is known as Catherine in film called Catherine series. Directed by Muniru Habiyakare and Munyaneza Prince, it is produced by Apoline Uwimana and Agape house films The film is a story of Ingabire Esther and Catherine is written by Apoline Uwimana and Muniru Habiyakare. It is a film of a young girl called Catherine abandonment by her Father and she killed him without knowing it as a mission of her mother.

Later on she acted in several popular films and television series that include Catherine and Nkubito ya Nyamunsi. In 2016, she acted in the television series City Maid. The show became highly popular among the public and she was often known as 'Nana'.

== Filmography ==
Year	Film	Role	Genre	Ref.
2014	Rwasibo	Jammy	Film	
2015	Catherine	Catherine	Film	
2015	Nkubito ya Nyamunsi	Hope	Film	
2016	Mutoni	Mutoni	TV series	
2016	City Maid	Nana	TV series	
