= Jean D'Amour Mutoni =

Rwandan Entrepreneur

Jean D'Amour Mutoni (born 1986) is a Rwandan social entrepreneur, co-founder and CEO at Acts Of Gratitude (AOG), a social enterprise based in Rwanda which tackles youth unemployment through training young people, to solve problems through creating their own social enterprises. He is also a One Young World Ambassador, a Global Health Corps member.

== Early life and education ==
In 1986, Mutoni was born in Ruhango in the southern province of Rwanda. He lost all of his direct family members in the 1994 Rwandan genocide, which occurred when he was only eight years of age.

=== AOG ===
In 2011, as students at the University of Rwanda, Mutoni and his 12 colleagues came up with an idea of starting up that an initiative that can help them give back to the community, which led to the founding of Acts Of Gratitude (AOG).

== Recognition and awards ==
In 2015, Mutoni was given a Queen's Young Leader Award, in appreciation of his efforts in supporting young Rwandan entrepreneurs, through the Acts of Gratitude(AOG) by offering trainings to equip young people with practical social entrepreneurship skills.
