= Junior Ndagano =

Rwandan-born Belgian footballer

Personal information
- Full name: Junior Rukondo Ndagano
- Date of birth: 25 October 1985 (age 41)
- Place of birth: Kigali, Rwanda
- Height: 1.75 m (5 ft 9 in)
- Positions: Left-back; left winger

Youth career
- K.V. Turnhout
- K.R.C. Genk

Senior career*
Years	Team	Apps	(Gls)
2000–2002	K.V. Turnhout	?	(?)
2002–2004	K.R.C. Genk	?	(?)
2004–2005	KV Mechelen	?	(?)
2005–2009	K.F.C. Dessel Sport	?	(?)
2009–2010	Paris FC	?	(?)
2011–2013	K.V. Turnhout	?	(?)

International career
2011	Rwanda	3	(0)
- * Club domestic league appearances and goals as of 5 July 2014

Ndagano Junior (born 25 October 1985) is a Rwandan-born Belgian football player who is currently out of contract.

Ndagano is a versatile left-sided forward or defender. He began his career at youth level with K.V. Turnhout before being signed by K.R.C. Genk as a 16-year-old. After two seasons at Genk he moved to KV Mechelen but did not managed to break into the first team. Since then he has played for a range of European clubs, including a spell with Paris FC, his most consistent period coming with Dessel Sport in the second division.

In 2011 Ndagano Junior was selected as part of a group of European players with Rwandan heritage to make a friendly tour of Rwanda. This led to him eventually being called up to the Rwandan National team.
