= Janvier Kanyamashuli =

Rwandan diplomat

Janvier Kanyamashuli was the ambassador of Rwanda to Burundi as of late 2007. He also served as Executive Secretary of the National Tender Board.
