= Moses Turahirwa =

Rwandan fashion designer & businessman

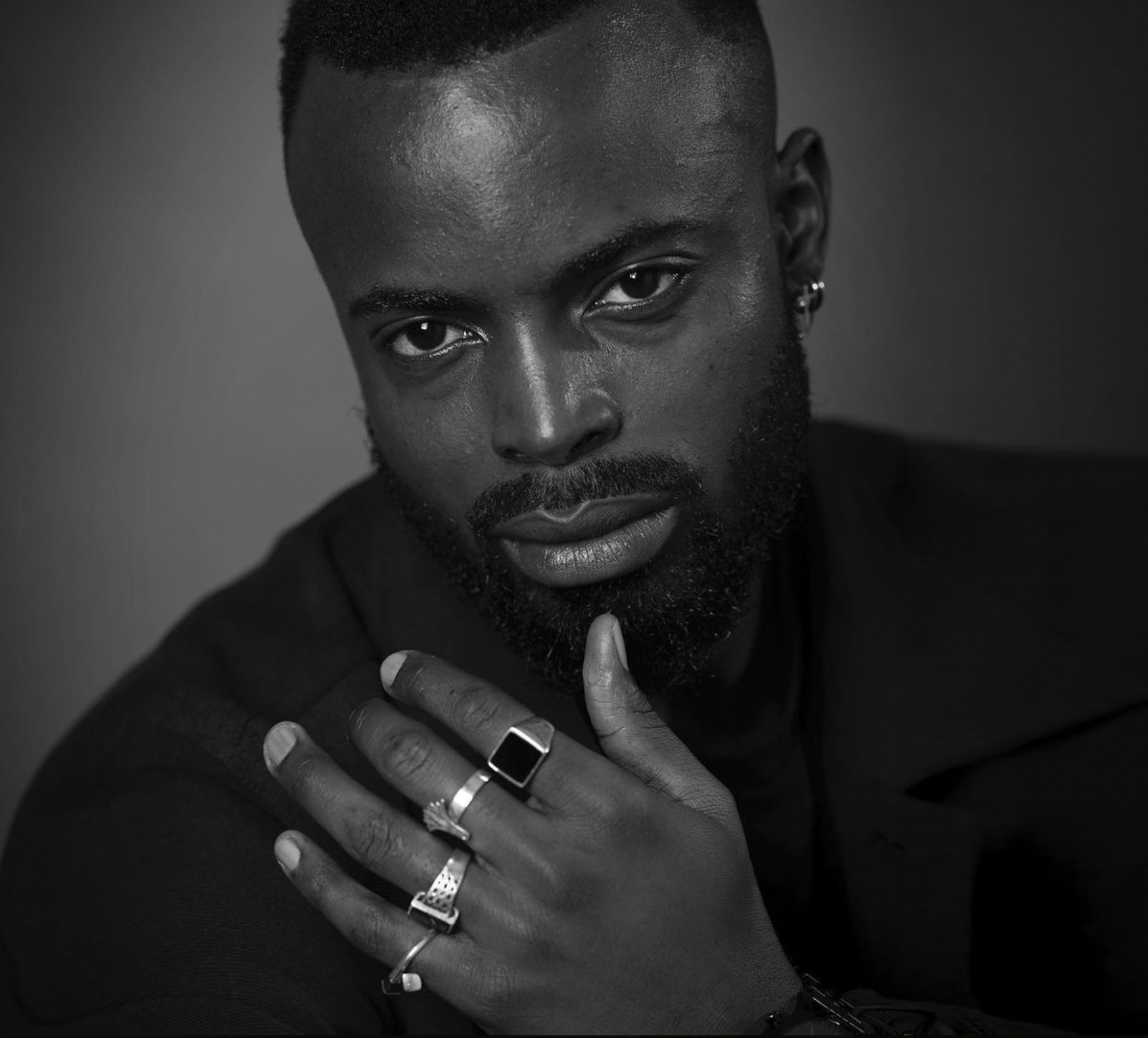
- Moses Turahirwa
- Born: Moses Turahirwa; Kibogora Village, Nyamasheke District
- Citizenship: Rwandan
- Education: Polimoda Fashion School
- Occupation: Fashion Designer
- Years active: 2015–present
- Known for: Fashion Design

Moses Turahirwa is a Rwandan, fashion designer and creative director. He is the founder of Moshions.

== Early life and education ==
Turahirwa was born in Kibogora Village, Nyamasheke District in Western Rwanda. He is the fourth born in a family of five children. He earned his Advanced Diploma in Civil Engineering from Integrated Polytechnic Regional Centre, Rwanda in 2016 and in 2021, he graduated with a master's degree in Collection Design from Polimoda Fashion School Italy.

== Career ==
In 2015, he started his fashion brand Moshions in Kigali. The first collection was shown at the Kigali Fashion Week, Rwanda. Turahirwa later exhibited his work in Nigeria, South Africa, Namibia and Italy. He has featured in different magazines including Vogue Italia, Jeune Afrique among others. In 2014, he was recognized as Mr. Integrated Polytechnic for Kigali and represented Rwanda on the continental beauty pageant as Mr. Africa International.

== Awards and honours ==
- 2021: Young Rwandan Achiever Award by Imbuto Foundation
- 2020: Emerging Made in Rwanda Entreprise of the Year by Rwanda Development Board
- 2020: ALL x Accord Campaign Ambassador for Paris Saint Germain
- 2018: Rwanda's Best Local Fashion House
- 2016: Second Runner-up, Mr Africa International
- 2014: Mister IPRC Kigali
