= Lionël Ruzindana =

Belgian actor of Rwandan descent (born 1987)

Lionel Ruzindana
- Born: Ruzindana Lionel; 1987 (age 38–39); Rwanda
- Occupation: Actor
- Years active: 2015–present
- Height: 1.83 m (6 ft 0 in)

Lionel Ruzindana (born 1987 as Ruzindana Lionel), is a Belgian actor with a Rwandan descent. He is best known for the roles in the films Earth and Blood, Third Wedding and Red Soil.

== Personal life ==
He was born in 1987 in Kigali, Rwanda as the eldest of the family and raised in Gikondo until 1994. He completed his primary education in Rwanda in Kigali City, until 7 years of age. He moved to Belgium and then lived in France for almost a year.

== Career ==
He started acting while moving to Belgium. He first graduated from the Sainte Marie Institute in Belgium. Meanwhile, he joined two drama groups and studied acting in detail. He started mainstream cinema acting in 2015. In 2018, he starred in the film Troisièmes Noces directed by David Lambert. Then he joined the play in Plein La Vue in 2019 with the help of Philippe Lyon. He also acted in the film Rouge directed by Farid Bentoumi as a 'guardian'.

In 2020 he acted in the film Earth and Blood with the role 'Süleyman'. In 2020, he acted in the film La Terre et Le Sangfilmmaker Julien Leclerq which is now airing on Netflix.

== Filmography ==
| Year | Film | Role | Genre | Ref. |
|---|---|---|---|---|
| 2018 | Third Wedding (Troisièmes noces) | | Film | |
| 2019 | Plein la vue | K-Yen | Film | |
| 2020 | Earth and Blood | Süleyman | Film | |
| 2020 | Red Soil | Le vigile | Film | |
| 2022 | Flo | Le kiné | Film | |
