= Yona Kanamuzeyi =

Rwandan deacon and martyr

- Died: 24 January 1964; Rwanda
- Spouse: Mary
- Children: 6
- Relatives: John Wesley Kanamuzeyi Gara (son)

Yona Kanamuzeyi (died 24 January 1964) was a Rwandan deacon and martyr. He was killed in Rwanda on 23 January 1964. As Kanamuzeyi was being led to the river where he would be shot he sang the hymn “There Is a Happy Land” Before he died, he asked permission to write in his journal and he wrote, "We are going to Heaven." He asked for the journal to be given to his wife and she eventually received it. A book was written about his life - Forgive them: the story of an African martyr, by J. E. Church and colleagues of the Ruanda Mission.
