= Thierry Dushimirimana =

Rwandan photographer and filmmaker

- Born: Thierry Dushimirimana; Bujumbura/Burundi
- Citizenship: Rwanda
- Occupations: Photographer and Filmmaker
- Notable work: A love letter to my country 2006, Iseta: Behind the roadblock 2010 and 6954 Kilometres to home.

Thierry Dushimirimana is a Rwandan photographer and filmmaker.

== Filmography ==
- In A Love Letter to My Country (2006), a Tutsi survivor falls in love with a Hutu man from a family involved in the Rwanda Genocide against the Tutsi. The film screened at several international film festivals, including the Tribeca Film Festival in New York City in 2011. He has collaborated with Eric Kabera, working with him as cinematographer on Juan Reina's 2010 documentary Iseta – behind the roadblock, which followed a British journalist Nick Hughes returning to find out more about the murder he had photographed in Kigali (Gikondo) in 1994.
- Une Lettre d'amour à mon pays [A Love Letter to My Country], 2006. 36 min. Director.
- Iseta: Behind the Roadblock, 2010, dir. Juan Reina. Cinematographer.
- 6954 Kilometres to Home / 6954 kilometriä kotiin, 2013, dir. Juan Reina. Production Manager.
