= Nathalie Mpaka =

Rwandan accountant

- Born: Rwanda
- Citizenship: Rwanda
- Education: Birmingham City University (Bachelor of Arts in Accounting and Finance); University of Salford; Master of Science in International Banking and Finance; Association of Chartered Certified Accountants (Chartered Certified Accountant); Institute of Certified Public Accountants of Rwanda (Member of ICPA Rwanda)
- Occupations: Accountant, Corporate Executive
- Years active: 2007 - Present
- Known for: Professional competence
- Title: Chief Financial Officer at BK Group, Kigali, Rwanda

Nathalie Mpaka, is an accountant and corporate executive at BK Group Plc (formerly Bank of Kigali), the largest commercial bank in Rwanda. She is the chief financial officer at BK Group.

== Education ==
Mpaka has a Bachelor of Arts degree in Accounting and Finance, obtained from the Birmingham City University, in Birmingham, United Kingdom, in 2006. She is also a Chartered Certified Accountant, recognized by the Association of Chartered Certified Accountants (ACCA), of the United Kingdom. She also holds a Master of Science in International Banking and Finance, from the University of Salford in the United Kingdom. In addition, she is a member of the Institute of Certified Public Accountants in Rwanda (ICPAR).

== Career ==
While still an undergraduate between 2004 and 2006, she worked as an Assistant Management Accountant at Parkwood Leisure Limited, a company based in Worcester, England, approximately 50 kilometres (31 mi), southwest of the city of Birmingham. She was then hired as a Chartered Certified Accountant, by White Stuff Clothing, a chain of over 115 clothing stores in the United Kingdom, working there for five years from 2007 until 2012.

In 2012, she relocated to Rwanda and was hired by the Bank of Kigali as a Financial Reporting Manager, working there for two years. In December 2014, she was promoted to Chief Financial Officer, a position she still occupies as of March 2019.

== Other considerations ==
She is a member of the board of directors at Bank of Kigali General Insurance, a subsidiary of BK Group Plc. She concurrently serves as a member of the senior management team at the bank. She is also a member of Governing Council at the Institute of Certified Public Accountants of Rwanda.

== See also ==
- Diane Karusisi
