= Maggy Corrêa =

Maggy Corrêa is a Rwandan Swiss autobiographical writer. In her memoir Tutsie, etc. (1998) she recounts how she rescued her mother from the Rwandan genocide against the Tutsi in July 1994.

== Life ==
Corrêa was born in Rwanda, to a Portuguese father and a Rwandan Tutsi mother. Swiss by adoption, she was educated in Rwanda, Belgian Congo and Burundi.

Corrêa lived in Valais for over twenty years. She established and directed a dance school for ten years before becoming an independent journalist, writing for Le Nouveau Quotidien, Le Temps and Le Nouvelliste. She also worked as a radio host for Radio Rhône Valais and a television host for Radio Télévision Suisse. She presentedVanille Fraise, a 25-minute weekly program featuring a general knowledge game about sexuality, from its launch in November 1993 until February 1994.

In May 1994 Corrêa attempted to draw attention to the unfolding Rwandan genocide with an article in the Swiss newspaper Le Nouveau Quotidien. She was a disillusioned observer of United Nations ineffectiveness at the Palace of Nations in Geneva. In July 1994 she "decided against all odds to go to Rwanda at the height of the genocide of the Tutsi to attempt to save her mother; her book Tutsie, etc. (1998) is the account of this incredible journey".

Her 2018 novel À la lueur de la lampe-tempête (1998) tells the true story of Mario Augusto de Jesus du Valle Correia (Mario Corrêa), who in the late-19th century secretly freed a hundred slaves in the Portuguese colonies and ensured their exile to Angola.

== Works ==
- Tutsie, etc.: récit [Tutsi, etc.: a story]. Grolley: Les Ed. de l'Hèbe; Sierre: Monographic, 1998. ISBN 978-2940063383
- À la lueur de la lampe-tempête [By the light of the hurricane lamp]. Saint Honoré Editions, 2018. ISBN 978-2407011483
