= Valerie Piraino =

Rwandan and American artist (born 1981)

- Born: 1981 (age 44–45); Kigali, Rwanda
- Education: Maryland Institute College of Art (BFA), Columbia University School of the Arts (MFA)
- Occupations: Visual artist, educator
- Known for: Sculpture, installation art, drawing
- Spouse: Drew Piraino
- Website: valeriepiraino.com

Valerie Piraino (born 1981) is a Rwandan and American contemporary visual artist, who works mainly in sculpture, drawing and installation. Her art reflects her transnational identity, and includes themes like defining the many aspects of identity as a whole, anti-colonialism (or anti-imperialism), African diaspora, and ancestral identity and memory. She lives in Ulster County, New York.

== Biography ==
Valerie Piraino was born in 1981 in Kigali, Rwanda, and she raised both in her home country, as well as in the United States. Her mother, is a Rwandan apparel designer and seamstress and her father, is an American, who has worked in international development and relief. She spending her early childhood in the Democratic Republic of Congo, and three other countries throughout Africa. At the age of 4, she moved with her family to the United States, first to Arizona, and later to Baltimore, Maryland.

She studied at the Maryland Institute College of Art (BFA degree, 2004) in Baltimore. While studying, she was awarded a large grant and traveled back to Rwanda, where much of her mother's side of the family had been killed in the Rwandan Genocide. This trip inspired her work as a transnational artist, including her thesis project. In 2005, Piraino moved to New York City, and began studies at Columbia University School of the Arts, where she received a M.F.A in 2009.

She previously worked as a part-time faculty member at Parsons School of Design at The New School.

== Notable works and exhibitions ==
Arguably, her most notorious work is a series of sculptures consisting of papayas created by carving layers of polystyrene, and then covering the shapes in black epoxy clay, paint, resin, sawdust, and occasionally using gold paint to accent the work. The papayas are either displayed on flat surfaces or, as a later development, hung using nets created with twine. When discussing the significance behind the colors, black and gold, Piraino states that the black and gold are reminiscent of the mining and environmental damage that has taken place in Africa due to colonialism. The colors and textures are also said to represent the skin of the people from the region who were exploited for the natural resources of the country. Papayas were the fruit chosen to represent the artists transnational identity and anti-colonial attitude for two main reasons. First, papayas were a common breakfast for the artist when she was a young girl growing up in Africa. Secondly, papayas, native to the Caribbean, represent colonialism because they "follow the trajectory of imperialism and colonialism". Throughout the years and across multiple exhibitions, the meaning behind the work has shifted slightly. In a group exhibit that ended in January, 2017 called Dis Place in the Museum of Contemporary African Diasporan Arts, the papayas appeared to be broken and bruised, representing violence against African women.

While the papayas are some of Valerie's most notable works, she has created many other bodies of work and has been in exhibitions across the country, as well as being featured in exhibits in other countries around the world.

== List of exhibitions ==
=== Solo exhibitions ===
Piraino's solo exhibitions
Year	Exhibition title	Institution	Location	Notes
2011	Solo show by Valerie Piraino	Meyerhoff Gallery, Maryland Institute College of Art	Baltimore, Maryland	
2013	Valerie Piraino: Reconstruction	Crosstown Arts	Memphis, Tennessee	
2013	Valerie Piraino: Photoplay	Cindy Rucker Gallery	New York City, New York	

=== Group exhibitions ===
Piraino's group exhibitions
Year	Exhibition title	Institution	Location	Notes
2009	The Practice of Joy Before Death	Scaramouche	New York City, New York	
2010	Usable Pasts	Studio Museum in Harlem	New York City, New York	
2011	The Third Party	Night Gallery	Los Angeles, California	
2012	The Bearden Project: Homage	Studio Museum in Harlem	New York City, New York	
2012	Get it on the Record	Visceglia Gallery, Caldwell College	Caldwell, New Jersey	
2012	Fore	Studio Museum in Harlem	New York City, New York	
2013	Present Future	Artissima	Turin, Italy	
2013	Body Language	Studio Museum in Harlem	New York City, New York	
2013	Round 39: Looking Back, Moving Forward	Project Row Houses	Houston, Texas	
2014	Lucky Draw	Sculpture Center	New York City, New York	
2014	The House Seems All Upset: Exploring Critical Whiteness	Jade Addams Hull-House Museum	Chicago, Illinois	
2014	Retreat	Valerie Carberry Gallery	Chicago, Illinois	
2014	The Bearden Project: Homage	Texas State University	San Marcos, Texas	
2015	After Afropolitan	Weeksville Heritage Center	Brooklyn, New York	
2015	Africa's Out	Gladstone Gallery	New York City, New York	
2015	Mirror Mirror	Kate Werble Gallery	New York City, New York	
2015	Displace	MoCADA	Brooklyn, New York	
2016	SHE: Deconstructing Female Identity	ArtsWestchester	White Plains, New York	
2016	Collector's Club	Project Row Houses	Houston, Texas	
2016	CAMSTL Gala	Contemporary Art Museum St. Louis	St, Louis, Missouri	
2016	Palatable	Studio Museum in Harlem	New York City, New York	
2016	Lucky Draw	Sculpture Center	New York City, New York	
2016	Whatever moves between us also moves the world in general	Murray Guy Gallery	New York City, New York	
2016	Africans in America	Goodman Gallery	Johannesburg, South Africa	
2017	Elective Affinities: A Library	Hunter College Art Galleries	New York City, New York	
2017	A Fast, Moving Sky	The Third Line Gallery	Dubai, United Arab Emirates	
2017	The Socrates Annual	Socrates Sculpture Park	New York City, New York	

== Awards and residencies ==
Valerie has received many fellowships and awards throughout her years of creating art.

Piraino's awards and fellowships
Year	Name of award	Notes
2004	Jacques and Natasha Gelman Travel Award	
2009	Studio Museum in Harlem, artist-in-residence	
2014	Joan Mitchell Foundation, emerging teaching artist fellow	
2015	Lower Manhattan Cultural Council, process space residency	
2017	Socrates Sculpture Park, emerging artist fellowship	
2017	Offshore Residency	
2018	Joan Mitchell Center, artist-in-residence	
