= Marie-Christine Kessler =

French political scientist

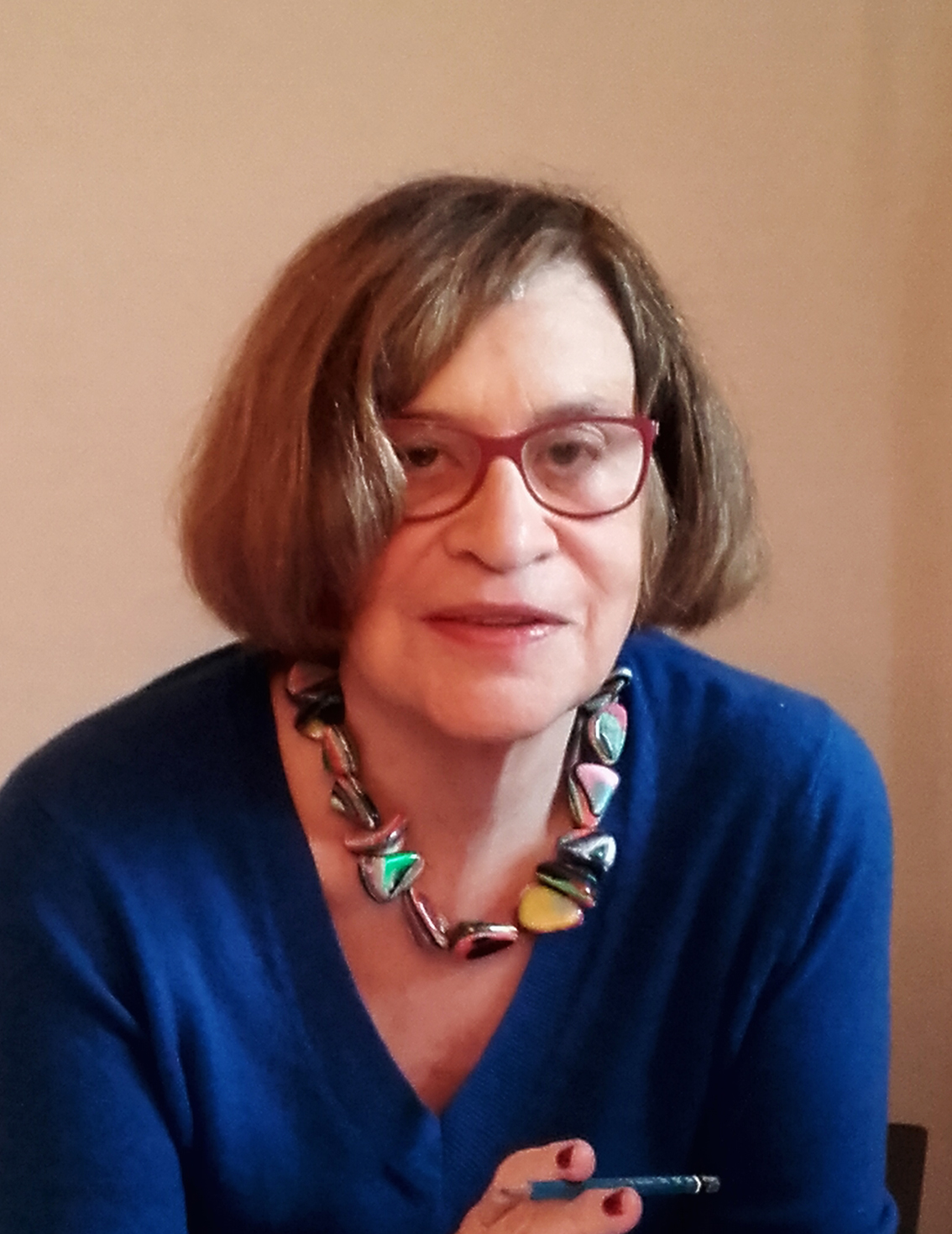
- Marie-Christine Kessler in 2016
- Education: Instituts d'études politiques
- Awards: Legion of Honour; Ordre national du Mérite
- Scientific career
- Fields: Political science
- Workplaces: University of Paris II Panthéon-Assas; French National Centre for Scientific Research

Marie-Christine Kessler is a French political scientist. She is currently the emerita research director at the French National Centre for Scientific Research, and spent much of her career at the University of Paris II Panthéon-Assas. She studies the role of elites in shaping public policy, as well as French foreign policy.

== Biography ==
Kessler graduated from the Instituts d'études politiques in Paris, specialising in the study of public service. She then obtained a Doctor of Law degree in 1967, and in 1983 she earned a PhD in political science.

Kessler spent much of her career as a researcher in political sociology and administrative science at University of Paris II Panthéon-Assas. Her research focused primarily on the theme of public action, particularly the interaction between elites and public policies. She explored these topics in multiple books, including Le Conseil d'État (The state council) in 1968 and Grands Corps de l'Etat (The Grand Corps of the State) in 1986. She subsequently published two books on French foreign policy: La politique étrangère de la France. Acteurs et processus (Foreign policy in France: Actors and processes) in 1999, and Les Ambassadeurs (The ambassadors) in 2012.

Currently, Kessler is currently the emerita research director at the French National Centre for Scientific Research, associated with the Center for Studies and Research in Administrative Science (fr) there. From 1995 until 2000, she was a member of the national committee of section 40 of the French National Centre for Scientific Research, and was the president from 2000 until 2004.

Kessler was also affiliated with the Cultural, Scientific, and Technical Affairs branch of the French Ministry of Europe and Foreign Affairs from 1985 to 1990.

== Selected works ==
- Le Conseil d'État (1968)
- Grands Corps de l'Etat (1986)
- La politique étrangère de la France. Acteurs et processus (1999)
- Les Ambassadeurs (2012)

== Selected honours ==
- Chevalier, Legion of Honour
- Chevalier, French National Order of Merit
