= Jean Luc Mitana =

Rwandan filmmaker

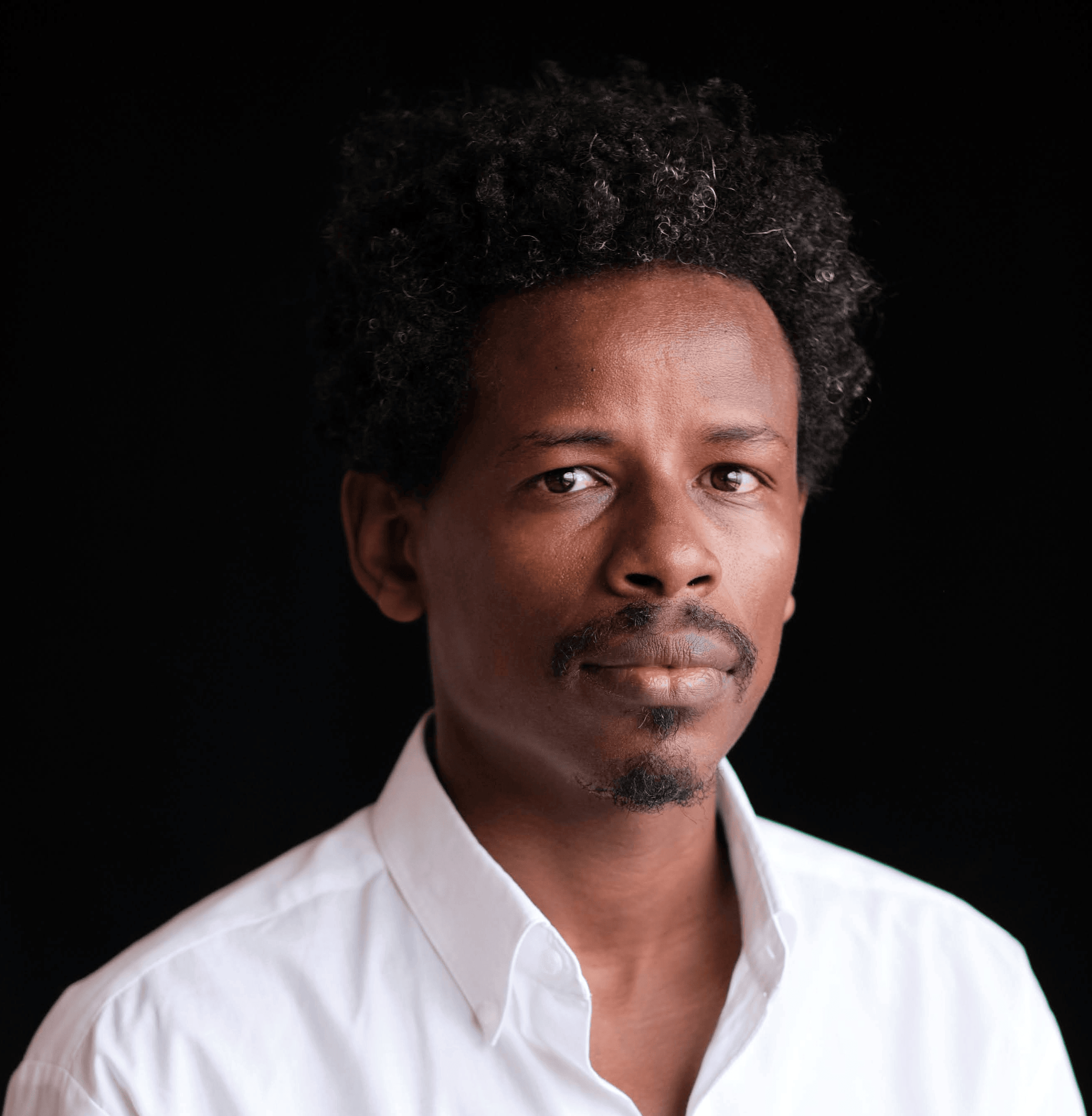
- Jean Luc Mitana
- Born: Jean Luc Mitana; 29 September 1983 (age 42); Kigali, Rwanda
- Occupations: Movie Director, movie producer, movie writer
- Years active: 2006–present
- Known for: film making

Jean Luc Mitana (born 29 September 1983), is a Rwandan filmmaker and cinematographer. He is the founder of Inzu Films Production Company based in Rwanda. He has served as a cinematographer in various films including Behind the Word, Kai the Vendor and Strength in Fear.

== Personal life ==
He was born on 29 September 1983 in Kigali, Rwanda.

== Career ==
In 2006, he joined Almond Tree Films Collective and in 2009, Mitana worked on the film known as Maibobo which was directed by Yves Montand Niyongabo and it was premiered at the Rotterdam International Film Festival in 2010. It was awarded at the 2011 Festival Cinema Africano d’Asia e America Latina in Milan, Italy. He directed SAA-IPO in 2010. It was shot in Kigali and funded by Tribeca Film Institute. The film was premiered at the 2011 Tribeca Film Festival and then screened at the 2011 Durban International Film Festival and AfryKamera International Film Festival, Poland in 2011. Then in 2014, he worked on the documentary Behind the World directed by Marie-Clementine Dusejambo. In 2014, he attended the Berlinale Talents, where he was part of the Editing Studio.

== Filmography ==
Year	Film	Role	Genre	Ref.
2009	Maibobo	Cinematographer	Documentary	
2009	The 100 Days That Didn't Shake the World	Cast	Documentary	
2010	SAA-IPO	Director	Documentary	
2012	Strength in Fear	Cinematography	Documentary	
2014	Behind the World	Director	Documentary	
2015	Damali	Director	Documentary	
2016	Kai the vendor	Director	Documentary	
