= Murashi Isaïe =

Rwandan historian and former politician

Ambassador Murashi Isaïe

Ambassador of Rwanda to Uganda
- In office January 1996 – June 2000

Member of Parliament
- In office June 2000 – October 2007

Personal details
- Born: 29 April 1949 (age 77)
- Education: Université de Kinshasa

Amb.Murashi Isaïe (born 29 April 1949) is a Rwandan former politician and diplomat who served as the ambassador of Rwanda to Uganda from 1996 to 2000 and was a member of the Parliament of Rwanda from 2000 to 2007. He is a researcher, historian and author; he has written two books on the origin of genocide against the Tutsi.
