= Eric Eugène Murangwa =

Rwandan footballer

Eugène Murangwa
Personal information
- Full name: Eric Eugène Murangwa
- Date of birth: 9 November 1975 (age 50)
- Place of birth: Rwamagana, Rwanda
- Position: Goalkeeper

Senior career*
Years	Team	Apps	(Gls)
1992–1994	Rayon Sports		

International career
1996	Rwanda	1	(0)
- * Club domestic league appearances and goals

Eugène Murangwa (born 9 November 1975) is a Rwandan former footballer who played for the Rwanda national team. His playing position was goalkeeper.

In 1994, Eric Murangwa Eugene and his immediate family survived the genocide against the Tutsi in Rwanda. Their survival is owed, in part, to the courage and humanity shown by his former teammates of the Rayon Sports Football Club, of which Murangwa was also a member. As a result of this, Murangwa has developed a strong belief that sport, and in particular football as well as storytelling, have the power to influence society in a way that little else does. Murangwa has a mission to make sport and storytelling an integral part of the Rwandan reconciliation and reconstruction process insisting sport is not just for fun and leisure but can also be used as a tool for social change and life skills.

In 1997, following an international match for Rwanda in Tunisia, he sought asylum and emigrated to the United Kingdom via Belgium following the Rwandan genocide. During the Genocide he lost 35 members of his family.

In 1998 Eric was awarded an MBE in the Queen’s New Year’s Honours list for his services to the Awareness and Education of Genocide against the Tutsi of Rwanda.

In 2010, he founded Football for Hope, Peace & Unity.

== International career ==
He was involved in Rwanda's 1998 FIFA World Cup qualifying campaign and played in a game versus Tunisia.
