= Marie-Christine Gasingirwa =

Rwandan government official and scientist

Marie-Christine Gasingirwa is the Director General for Science, Technology and Research in the Ministry of Education in Rwanda.

== Education ==
Gasingirwa earned a bachelor's degree in Zoology and Biochemistry, in followed by a master's degree in Agricultural Biotechnology, and a PhD in Biomedical and Pharmaceutical Sciences.

== Career ==
In 2013, Gasingirwa was the Rector of the Kigali Institute of Science and Technology in Kigali, Rwanda.

In April 2013, Gasingirwa spoke at the Association of Commonwealth Universities one-day conference at the University of Nairobi on the subject of "Enhancing Gender Equity in the Leadership and Management of Higher Education".

In August 2016, Gasingirwa was a member of the local organizing committee of the fourth biennial African School of Fundamental Physics and Applications, ASP2016, held at the University of Rwanda's College of Sciences and Technology spoke about the role of "education as a key to limit poverty and discrimination", and as an example highlighted how grandmothers were sent to India in 2012 to train for six months to become fully qualified solar engineers.

== Other roles ==
Gasingirwa is the Vice President of the Commission Nationale Rwandaise pour l'UNESCO (CNRU) (National Commission for UNESCO) in Kigali.

== Personal life ==
Gasingirwa speaks Kinyarwanda, English, French and Kiswahili.
