= Musanase Laura =

Rwandan actress (born 1993)

- Born: Musanase Laura; 1993 (age 32–33); Tanzania
- Occupation: Actress
- Years active: 2018–present

Musanase Laura (born 1993), is a Rwandan actress. Laura is best known for the role of 'Nikuze' in the television sitcom City Maid.

== Personal life ==
She was born in Tanzania, but raised in Rwanda, in a family with six siblings. She attended Bright Academy Primary School in Nyagatare District. Later she attended Lycée de Kigali for her secondary education and finally FAWE Girls’ School. She currently lives in Gisozi, Gasabo district.

== Career ==
She made her acting debut with a leading role in the television sitcom City Maid. Her role became highly popular with the public. She left the role for a few years, but later confirmed that she would return to the serial soon. She was also nominated in the Best Actress category in the Rwanda Movie Awards.

== Filmography ==
Year	Film	Role	Genre	Ref.
2018	City Maid	Nikuze	TV sitcom	
