= Charles Munyaneza =

Rwandan man living in the (born 1958)

Charles Munyaneza (born 1958) is a Rwandan man living in the Putnoe area of Bedford, England.

== Biography ==
In March 2006, he was named in a list prepared by the Rwandan government of Rwandan genocide suspects living abroad.

During the genocide, Munyaneza was the mayor (burgomaster) of Kinyamakara commune in the prefecture of Gikongoro. Munyaneza was known for his good relations with Tutsi, despite his membership of the MRND party. Munyaneza hid Tutsi from a neighboring commune in his house during the genocide, and fought off assailants to defend them. After 1994, he sought asylum in the United Kingdom under the name "Muneza", and was granted indefinite leave to remain in 2002.

In a statement to The Guardian, Munyaneza proclaimed his innocence and stated he was willing to go to an English court to clear his name.

He was arrested in Britain on 28 December 2006 and placed in HMP Belmarsh. His extradition to Rwanda has been denied twice by the British authorities.
