= Oceanne Iradukunda =

Rwandan-American actress, filmmaker and model

Belle Oceanne Iradukunda
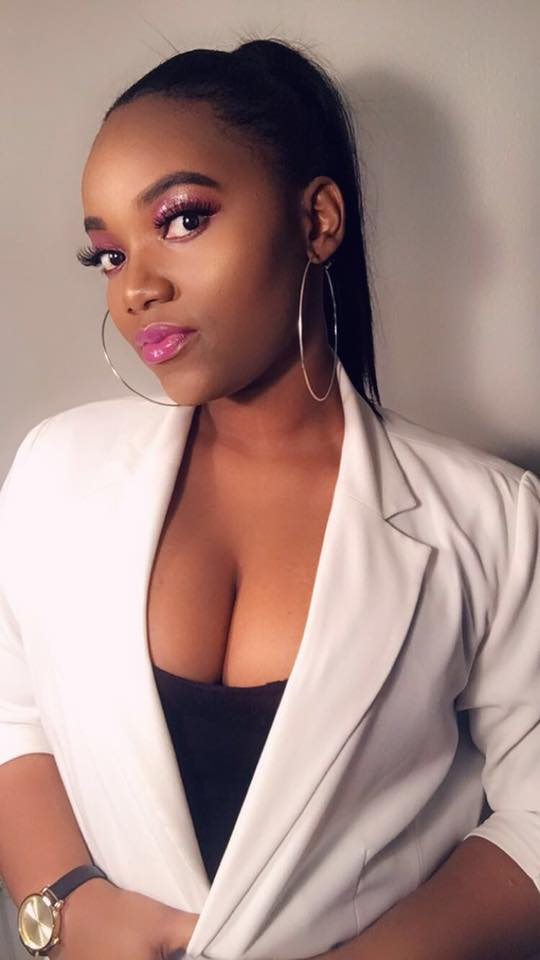
- Belle in 2018
- Born: Belle Oceanne Iradukunda; November 11, 1996 (age 29); Rwanda
- Occupations: Actress; Writer; Film director
- Years active: 2000 – Present
- Known for: Sistas (TV series) (2019 – present); 'Til Death Do Us Part (2017)

Belle Oceanne Iradukunda (born November 11, 1996) is a Rwandan-American actress, film director, and writer. She was born and raised in Rwanda, and presently lives in Los Angeles, California. Her nickname, Belle, was adopted by her from films such as Living with the Dead, Till Death Do Us Apart, and Shifty Business.

== Career ==
Iradukunda appeared in a Hollywood comedy-drama TV Series by Tyler Perry titled, Sistas, televised on BET from October 23, 2019, playing the role of a waitress. In 2020, she wrote and directed the film Thank You for Underestimating Me.

== Filmography ==
=== Film ===
Year	Film	Role	Notes	Ref.
2020	Thank You for Underestimating Me	Director • Writer	Adventure film in pre-production stage	
2017	'Til Death Do Us Part	Actress	Romance, Thriller	

=== Television ===
Year	Film	Role	Notes	Ref.
2019–present	Sistas	Loni	TV series	

== Controversies ==
In March 2018, The New Times of Rwanda reported the actress for accusing the main organizer of the Kigali International Fashion Week, John Bunyeshuli, of an alleged theft of her original concept.
