= Yolande Mukagasana =

Rwandan writer

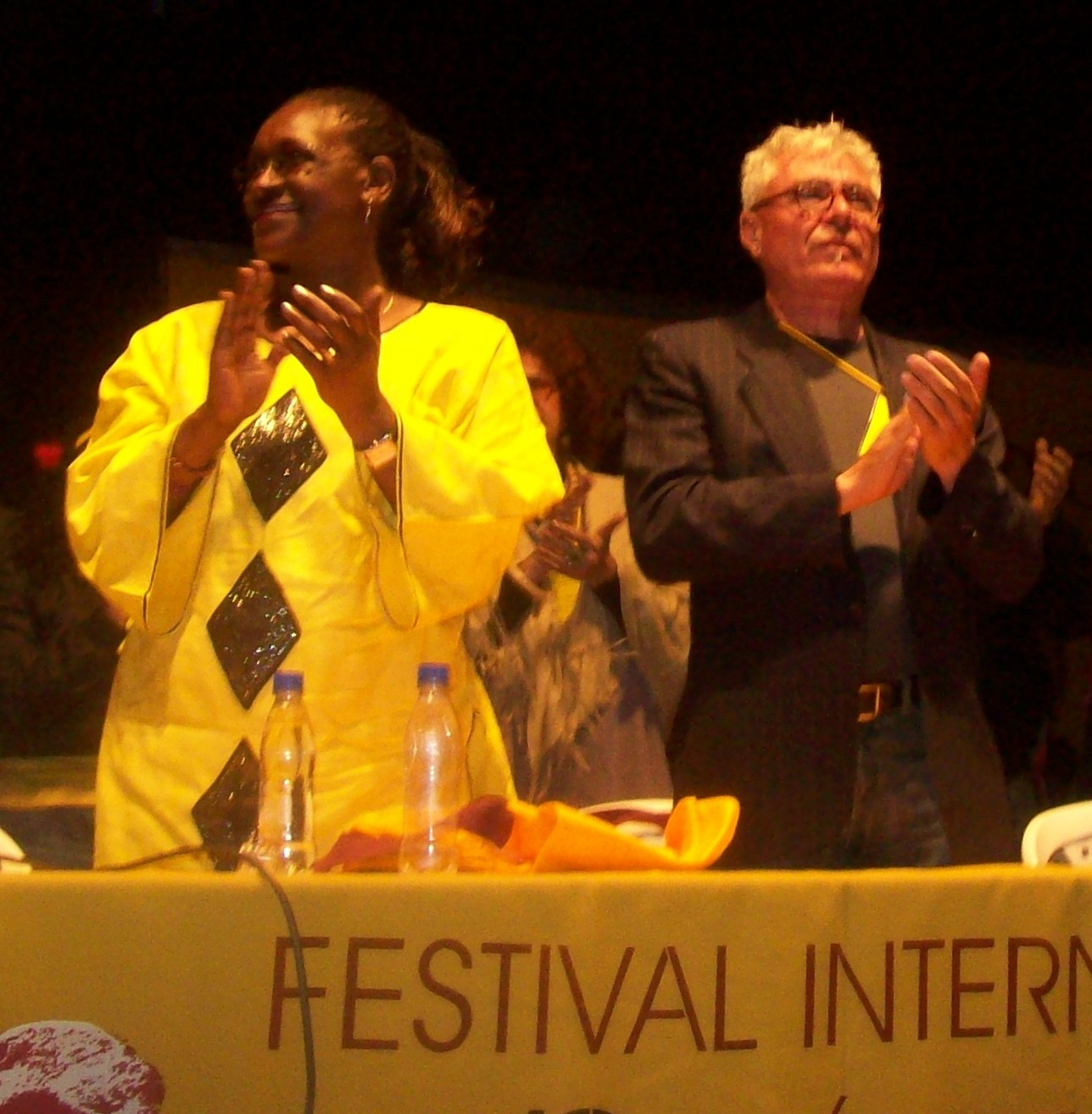
Yolande Mukagasana (left) and Gerhard Falkner at the XVIII International Poetry Festival of Medellín.

Yolande Mukagasana (born 6 September 1954) is a Rwandan writer writing in French who is a survivor of the 1994 genocide against the Tutsi.

She was a Tutsi nurse and anaesthetist working at a hospital in Kigali. She fled to Belgium during the 1994 genocide against the Tutsi; her husband, her children and many of the people she knew were killed. In Belgium, her qualifications were not recognized so she worked in a senior's residence. She later adopted some of her nieces whose parents had been killed and other Rwandan orphans.

Mukagasana returned to Rwanda with Greek-Belgian photographer Alain Kazinierakis. Together, they produced the travelling exhibition Les Blessures du silence, witness accounts of the genocide. They also founded Nyamirambo, point d'appui, an organization aimed at rebuilding. With the theatrical group Groupov, she wrote the play Rwanda 94.

She has written two autobiographical works, La mort ne veut pas de moi (1997) and N'aie pas peur de savoir (1999). She has also published a collection of stories, titled De Bouche à oreille (2003). Her first memoir, La mort ne veut pas de moi, was translated into English as Not My Time to Die by Zoe Norridge in 2019.

In 2002, Mukagasana received the Golden Dove for Peace Prize awarded by Archivio Disarmo.
