= Venuste Nshimiyimana =

Rwandan-born Belgian journalist

- Education: Open University; Anglia Ruskin University
- Occupation: Journalist
- Years active: 1991–present

Vénuste Nshimiyimana is a Rwandan-born Belgian journalist. He is a presenter of the daily One o'Clock News show for the Great Lakes Region on Voice of America. He is a former presenter for the BBC TV bulletin programme (BBC Info) and the weekly news roundup for BBC Hebdo. As a senior team manager, he was editorially responsible for BBC Afrique’s TV output.

== Early life and education ==
Nshimiyimana was born in 1973 in Gishamvu sector of Nyumba district in the Southern Province of Rwanda and attended Nyumba Primary School and The Nyakibanda Major Seminary. A graduate of The Open University, where he received a Master's degree in social sciences, he also attended Anglia Ruskin University from 2016–2017, receiving a postgraduate diploma in marketing and studied international humanitarian law at the London School of Economics.

In April 1994, Nshimiyimana was living in the capital city of Kigali when the Rwandan genocide began. Hoping to escape the massacre, he took refuge in the compound of the school Ecole technique officielle Don Bosco. He witnessed how the UN peacekeepers, made up of Belgian, French and Italian soldiers, abandoned all the refugees except those with foreign nationalities.

== Broadcasting career ==
Nshimiyimana began his journalistic career as a trainee for Rwanda Television in Brussels (1991). He worked for Radio Rwanda in 1992 before moving to the African Union as a press officer seconded to the Neutral Military Observer Group. In 1993, he moved to the United Nations as a public information officer for the United Nations Assistance Mission for Rwanda (UNAMIR) working with the UN Special Representative to the Secretary-General (SRSG) and the UN army commander. In 1994, he moved to Belgium and freelanced as a foreign correspondent for the BBC. He also served as the editor of Radio Amahoro, set up by a Coalition of European NGO's as a response to the exodus of Rwandans to DRC and Tanzania. In September 1997, Nshimiyimana moved to London to be a producer and broadcast journalist for the BBC, and later worked as Regional Planning Editor for BBC Africa.

Nshimiyimana, a multi-lingual journalist, worked for diverse radio and TV teams across the BBC Africa department as editor, planning editor and senior journalist team manager. He was in charge of coverage planning for events such as the London Olympic Games in 2012, Nelson Mandela’s funeral in 2013 and the 2012 US presidential election. He also worked as an Africa and the Middle East editorial coordinator to change the narrative about Africa in the news coverage. For the past 15 years, Nshimiyimana has covered the Middle East. He was in Iraq, reporting for the BBC, in the aftermath of the fall of Saddam Hussein’s regime in May 2003.

Nshimiyimana gave a BBC interview with Jean Kambanda, the former prime minister in the caretaker government of Rwanda at the start of the 1994 Rwandan genocide, the first person convicted under the 1948 Genocide Convention since it came into effect in 1951, currently jailed in Koulikoro Prison in Mali. This created a controversy between BBC and the government of Rwanda and led to the closure of the Kinyarwanda/Kirundi programme BBC Gahuzamiryango coverage in Rwanda.

== Other activities ==
With his book Prelude du genocide rwandais, Enquête sur les circonstances politiques et militaires du meurtre du président Habyarimana (Prelude to Rwandan genocide, investigation into the political and military circumstances of the murder of President Habyarimana), Nshimiyimana became the first writer to establish a relation between the assassination of President Habyarimana and the 1994 genocide against Tutsis and moderate Hutus. The book aimed to describe the political environment immediately before the genocide.

Nshimiyimana was among 40 participants at the International Decision-Making in the Age of Genocide: Rwanda 1990-1994 Conference in The Hague in 2014. The conference focused on the breakdown in the Arusha Accords and the failure of the international community to either prevent the genocide or protect hundreds of thousands of innocent civilians.
