= Christophe Bazivamo =

Rwandan politician

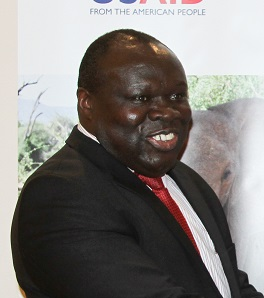
Bazivamo in 2019

Christophe Bazivamo is the Minister of Lands, Environment, Forestry, Water, and Mines in Rwanda. In 2003 and 2004 he was the Minister of Local Government, Community Development and Social Affairs. In 2005 he was the Minister of Internal Security. In 2000, 2001 and 2002 he served as Executive Secretary of the National Electoral Commission. He is a member of the Rwandan Patriotic Front, and since 2002 he has been the vice-president of the party.

Bazivamo is now a member of east African community parliament.
