= Bahavu Jeannette =

Rwandan actress

- Born: Bahavu Usanase geannette 17 July; Rwanda
- Occupations: Actress, TV host, fashion designer
- Years active: 2014–present

Bahavu Usanase Jeannette is a Rwandan actress. One of the most popular actresses in Rwanda, Bahavu is best known for the role 'Diane' in the TV series, City Maid. Apart from acting, she is also a fashion designer and television host. She married Ndayirukiye Fleury on March 27, 2021.

== Personal life ==
She was born in July, 17 in Rwanda. Her mother was also a popular Rwandan actress.

She previously dated Yverry. On July 17, 2020, Jeannette got engaged to her boyfriend Ndayikingurukiye Fleury aka 'Legend' whom she met in 2015. The engagement was celebrated at Scheba Hotel Kiyovu.

== Career ==
In 2019, she acted in the television serial City Maid with the role 'Diane'. Even though the character gained popularity, it was removed from the plot and a story released at the time shows that she was killed and dumped in Nyabarongo. After the drama, she joined with the film Twins in 2019. which is her project with her husband who is a producer.

She portrayed Pamela in the Inzozi film series, directed by Muniru Habiyakare and Felix Kamanzi, and produced by Ndayirukiye Fleury her husband and Rugwizangoga Tharcisse.

Apart from acting, she worked as a television host of a Christian Celebrity Show which aired from 2pm on Christian TV.

== Filmography ==
| Year | Film | Role | Genre | Ref. |
|---|---|---|---|---|
| 2018 | City Maid | Diane | TV series | |
| 2019 | Twins | keza | Film | |
