= EU4Health =

European Union health funding programme

EU4Health is a funding programme initiated by the European Union (EU) to strengthen healthcare systems across Europe and improve the overall health and well-being of EU citizens. Launched in 2021 as a response to the COVID-19 pandemic, it aims to mitigate the healthcare disparities that emerged during the pandemic, especially in preparedness and response capabilities, and to ensure that EU countries can effectively manage future health crises. It is governed by the European Commission (EC). It is the largest health programme ever financed by the EU; however, it slashed its initial budget of over €5 billion by nearly 20% in 2025, shifting the EU funding priorities to defence and security.

The EU4Health Civil Society Alliance is an advocacy body comprising a number of organisations concerned with health in the EU.

== Background and history ==
The EU4Health Civil Society Alliance comprises a group of organisations that banded together after EC president Jean-Claude Juncker presented the "Future of Europe" white paper in 2017, which included an option to "do less" in some policy areas relating to health. The group campaigns to improve funding for services that improve the health of Europeans, and continues its advocacy.

The EU4Health programme is the successor to the 3rd EU Health Programme. EU4Health was created in the wake of the COVID-19 pandemic in 2021, which highlighted the need for a more robust healthcare infrastructure across the EU. The programme is part of the EU's long-term budget for 2021–2027.

In 2025, the European Commission, which governs the program, cut the budget by nearly 20 per cent, from €5.3 billion to €4.1 billion, owing to making defence and security a higher priority. In July 2025, it belatedly published its work programme for that year, confirming that the operating grants for many patient and health advocacy groups would be withdrawn.

In July 2026, the European Commission announced that EU4Health would be merged with the new European Competitiveness Fund (ECF), along with the funding of agriculture, biotechnology, and bioeconomy. There has been much concern among NGOs, MEPs and some governments about the lack of predictable core funding. Staff have been laid off by some organisations, and some have closed their Brussels offices. In the ensuing vote for the 2026 work programme by member states in committee, ten supported the programme, while seven member states voted against it and ten abstained. This meant that the EC did not have the majority required to approve the programme.

In September 2026, the EUHealth Civil Society Alliance published a statement supported by 187 member organisations, titled "Support for health civil society and the restoration of operating grants under the EU4Health Work Programme".

== Objectives and initiatives ==
EU4Health focuses on enhancing healthcare resilience, preparedness, and access to healthcare services. Its general objectives are variously cited, including: (Note: Nos. 3 and 4 are sometimes combined.)

1. Crisis preparedness and management: to protect European citizens from serious cross-border health threats and improve crisis management capacity through various means
2. Access to medicines and medical devices relevant to health crises
3. Strengthen health systems and workforces so that they are able to deal with epidemics and long-term challenges, including disease prevention and health promotion in ageing and vulnerable populations
4. Digitising health systems, including the use of e-health and the creation of a European Health Data Area

In addition, cancer is "a cross-cutting priority".

In May 2022 EU4Health began a partnership with the International Federation of Red Cross and Red Crescent Societies (IFRC) to provide psychological first aid and mental health services to people across Europe affected by the war in Ukraine.

EU4Health also engages with the health authorities of EU member countries, such as the Public Health Agency of Sweden (Folkhälsomyndigheten). Any legal entity established in a member state, as well as legal entities established in a third country associated with the program, can apply for funding under one of the initiatives.

== Governance, funding, and implementation ==
The programme is overseen by the European Commission's Directorate-General for Health and Food Safety.

EU4Health had an allocated budget of c. €5.75 billion for the 2021-2027 period, (Note: Not fixed, and other numbers are quoted on various websites.) making it the largest health programme ever financed by the EU. However, this was cut to 4.1 billion in 2025.

Funds are distributed through grants, tenders, and other financing mechanisms managed by the European Health and Digital Executive Agency (HADEA).

== See also ==
- European Centre for Disease Prevention and Control (ECDC)
- European Medicines Agency (EMA)
