= Rwandan cinema =

History and development of the Rwandan film industry

A clapperboard in the colours of the Rwandan flag.

Rwandan cinema has a recent history that emerged following the genocide against the Tutsi in Rwanda, beginning from the end of the 1990s.

== History ==
=== Early beginnings ===
There were a few films shot in Rwanda before the 1994 genocide, such as King Solomon's Mines or Gorillas in the Mist, filmed in 1987 by British director Michael Apted. It was a $22 million biopic produced by Universal Pictures and Warner Bros. that told the story of Dian Fossey. The film was shot partly in Rwanda but the production remained American.

=== After the genocide ===
In 2001, 100 Days was released, the first Rwandan feature film about the genocide. The film was written, directed and produced by British journalist Nick Hughes and co-produced by Eric Kabera, Zairean-born but from a Rwandan family.

Ten years after the genocide, in 2004, Kabera wrote, directed and produced Gardiens de la mémoire. The same year, Raoul Peck released Sometimes in April. Following the international success of this film, several directors of different nationalities began producing films revisiting the events of 1994.

In 2008, Behind This Convent was released, directed by Gilbert Ndahayo.

=== Rwanda Cinema Centre ===
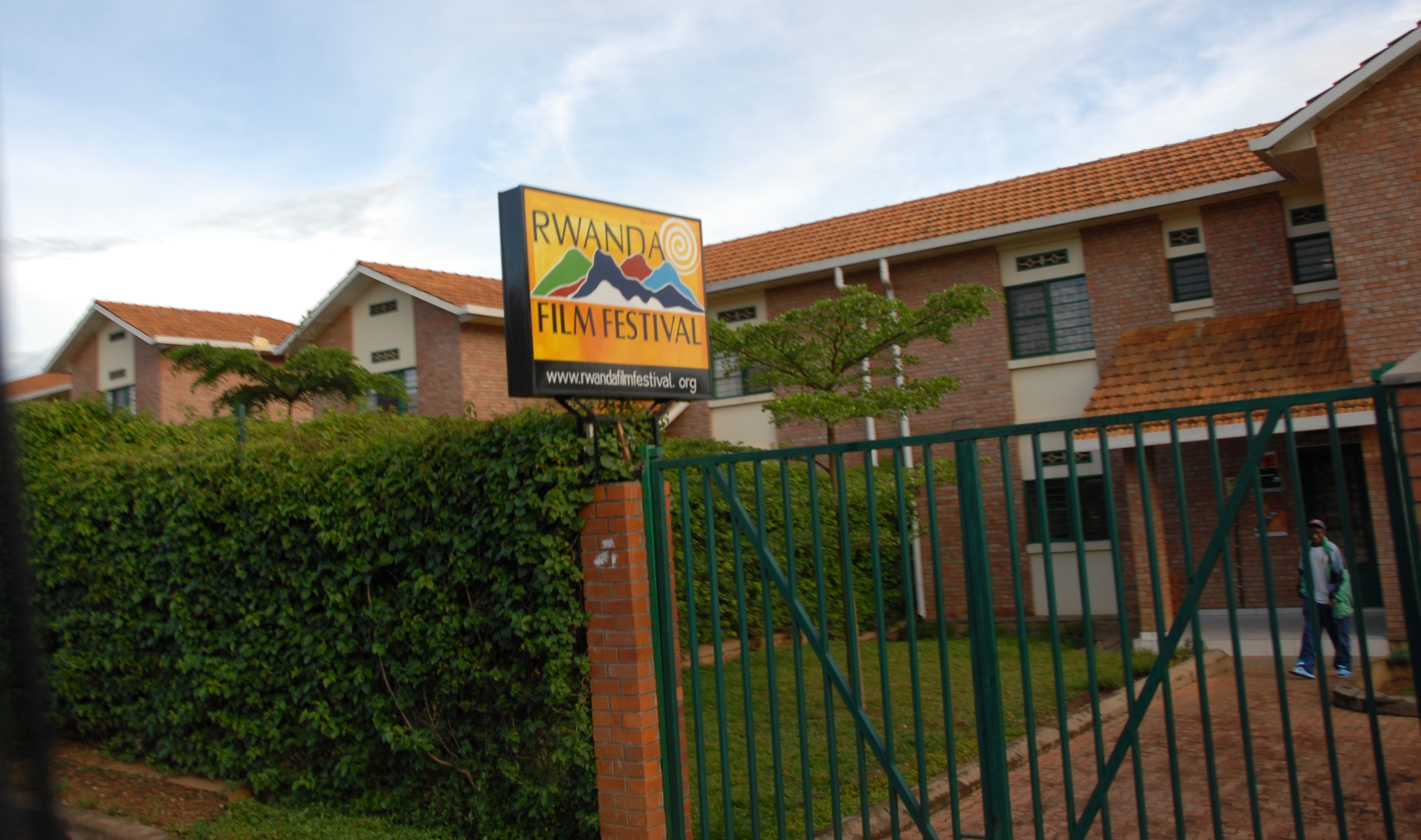
Rwanda Film Institute

In 2003, Eric Kabera founded the Rwanda Cinema Centre, which aims to develop audiovisual creation in Rwanda by training young Rwandan filmmakers. The idea came from the fact that there was no way to represent Rwandan voices and stories. Everything that had been broadcast about Rwanda had been created by others (Belgians, French, Canadians, Americans, etc.). The project was therefore to give young Rwandans the responsibility to tell their stories, with their vision. It aims to promote indigenous art and culture by creating films that reflect the past and current challenges of Rwandans, from a Rwandan perspective.

According to an interview with Eric Kabera: "Before, we received lessons from Swiss, Canadian or American mentors sporadically and somewhat randomly. Now, we offer intensive one-month workshops for young Rwandans who would like to learn the basics of filmmaking."

=== "Hillywood", the Rwanda Film Festival ===
Since 2005, the Rwanda Cinema Centre has organised the annual Rwandan film festival, the Rwanda Film Festival, better known as "Hillywood". The festival offers screenings of international films in Kigali and throughout the rest of the country. Screenings in the Rwandan countryside are held on inflatable screens and the festival's nickname is directly linked to the country's topography, which is very hilly and itself nicknamed "the land of a thousand hills". Its main objective is to promote and encourage awareness, understanding and appreciation of the art of cinema in Rwanda. It also serves as a platform for promoting Rwandan films and allows local professionals to exchange with international directors.

The Rwanda Film Festival lasts seven days and screens around sixty films, several of which are in Kinyarwanda (the national language). "These films don't just talk about the genocide. Other social issues remain to be explored in terms of cinematic creation."

Hillywood is now the nickname given to the Rwandan film industry, as Nollywood is for Nigeria.

=== International recognition ===
In 2012, Eric Kabera received the African Creative Visionary Award from the African Film Festival. He has also been recognised by the Directors Guild of America.

In November 2018, at the Kigali Audiovisual Forum, certain production and distribution companies offered to take charge of the projects of the three best Rwandan directors. Among them were Rushlake Media (Kenya), Diffa (France) and One Fine Day Films (Kenya).

== Economy ==
The Rwanda Cinema Centre describes its objective as "developing an alternative sector in the Rwandan economy. The centre wants policy makers as well as its development partners to participate by financially supporting the Rwandan film industry. The establishment has notably helped develop a culture of independent work. Its mission consists of teaching all skills related to audiovisual and film production."

When the centre was created in 2003, Eric Kabera simultaneously created the Rwanda Film Institute, an independent training department from the centre. The school offered intensive filmmaking training workshops over a period of about one month, after which students submitted their first film, in the form of a short film.

Since 2009, the Rwanda Film Institute appears to be no longer active. It is indeed under the name of Kwetu Film Institute that Eric Kabera continues to develop his enterprise. The school now offers courses ranging from three months for 320,000 Rwandan francs (approximately £320) to two years for 1.4 million Rwandan francs (approximately £1,400). It benefits notably from the support of the Swedish Film Institute, the Film Academy Baden-Württemberg, Filmpark Babelsberg as well as the Goethe Institute.

=== Cinemas ===
There are a few cinemas in the Rwandan capital:

- Century Cinemas (4 screens, opened since 2013). Shows national and international blockbusters. Ticket price: between 3,000 and 5,000 Rwandan francs (between £3 and £5).
- Cine 7 (2 screens for 96 seats). Shows blockbusters and more independent productions. Partner of the Rwanda Film Festival. Ticket price: 2,000 Rwandan francs for adults and 1,000 for children (£2 for adults and £1 for children).

=== Other screening venues ===
- The Kwetu Film Institute training school (founded in 2003 by Eric Kabera) sometimes organises screenings in its cafeteria.
- The German association Goethe-Institut regularly organises screenings, generally held on Tuesday evenings, in partnership with the Kwetu Film Institute.
- The cultural association Innovation Village organises a free screening on the roof of the public library every Wednesday evening.

== Rwandan filmmakers ==
- Rwandan film directors:
- Marie-Clémentine Dusabejambo (1987-)
- Thierry Dushimirimana
- Kantarama Gahigiri (1976-)
- Eric Kabera (1970-)
- Jacqueline Kalimunda (1974-)
- Joël Karekezi (1985-)
- Kivu Ruhorahoza (1982-)

== Rwandan actors ==
- Eliane Umuhire
- Miss Shanel
- Carole Karemera

== Films ==
=== Rwandan productions or co-productions ===
==== Fiction films ====
- 100 Days, 2001, by Nick Hughes and Eric Kabera
- Sometimes in April, 2004, by Raoul Peck
- Munyurangabo, 2007, by Lee Isaac Chung
- Grey Matter, 2011, by Kivu Ruhorahoza
- Kinyarwanda, 2011, by Alrick Brown
- Lyzia, 2011, by Marie-Clémentine Dusabejambo
- The Mercy of the Jungle, 2018, by Joël Karekezi

==== Documentaries ====
- Gacaca, Living Together Again In Rwanda?, 2002, by Anne Aghion
- Keepers of Memory, 2004, by Eric Kabera
- In Rwanda We Say…The Family That Does Not Speak Dies, 2004, by Anne Aghion
- God Sleeps in Rwanda, 2005, by Kimberlee Acquaro
- My Neighbor, My Killer, 2009, by Anne Aghion, as well as films from the Gacaca Film Series (2002–2009)

=== Foreign productions about Rwanda ===
==== Fiction films ====
- Hotel Rwanda, 2004, by Terry George
- Shooting Dogs, 2005, by Michael Caton-Jones
- A Sunday in Kigali, 2006, by Robert Favreau (director)
- Operation Turquoise (TV film)|Operation Turquoise (TV film), 2007, by Alain Tasma
- Ezra, 2007, by Newton Aduaka
- Shake Hands with the Devil, 2007, by Roger Spottiswoode
- The Day God Walked Away, 2008, by Philippe Van Leeuw
- We Are All Rwandans, 2008, by Deborah Gardner-Paterson
- Front Lines, 2009, by Jean-Christophe Klotz
- Africa United, 2010, by Deborah Gardner-Paterson

==== Documentaries ====
- Africa in Pieces, 2000, by Jihan El-Tahri
- Umurage, 2002, by Gorka Gamarra
- Kill Them All!, 2004, by Raphaël Glucksmann, David Hazan and Pierre Mezerette
- Rwanda, the Hills Speak, 2006, by Bernard Bellefroid
- Kigali, Images Against a Massacre, 2006, by Jean-Christophe Klotz
- Screamers, 2006, by Carla Garapedian
- Flores de Ruanda, 2007, by David Muñoz
- Iseta: Behind the Roadblock, 2008, by Juan Reina
- Flower in the Gun Barrel, 2008, by Gabriel Cowan
- From Arusha to Arusha, 2009, by Christophe Gargot

== See also ==
=== Bibliography ===
- Ramirez F., Rolot C., Histoire du cinéma colonial au Zaïre, Rwanda et Burundi, Tervueren, Musée royal de l'Afrique centrale, 1985

=== Related articles ===
- Rwanda Cinema Centre (RCC, 2003)
- Rwanda Film Festival (Kigali, 2005)
- List of films about the Rwandan genocide
- Mashariki African Film Festival (MAFF, 2015)
- Urusaro International Women Film Festival (2019)
- Mass media in Rwanda
