= List of films about the Rwandan genocide =

This is a filmography for films and artistry on the graphic, theatrical and conventional, documental portrayal of the Rwandan genocide against the Tutsis in 1994. In 2005 Alison Des Forges wrote that eleven years after the genocide films for popular audiences on the subject greatly increased "widespread realization of the horror that had taken the lives of more than half a million Tutsi".

== Films ==
- 100 Days (2001). The film was the first feature film made about the genocide and focuses on the life of a young, refugee Tutsi girl and her attempts to find safety while the genocide is taking place.
- Hotel Rwanda (2004). Dramatic feature film about Paul Rusesabagina, a Kigali hotelier, and the events around the Hôtel des Mille Collines, a sanctuary for Tutsi and moderate Hutu after its owner shut his doors against the genocide. The film was nominated for multiple Academy Awards, is on the American Film Institute's list of the 100 most inspirational films of all time, and appears on the IMDb's Top 250 highest rated movies of all time.
- Shooting Dogs (called Beyond the Gates in the US) (2005). A priest (John Hurt) and a teacher (Hugh Dancy) get caught up in the Rwanda genocide against the Tutsi in 1994. Dramatic feature film directed by Michael Caton-Jones.
- Sometimes in April (2005). Dramatic feature film detailing events prior, during and after the Rwanda genocide against the Tutsi in 1994 through the story of an intermarried Hutu-Tutsi family.
- A Sunday in Kigali (2006). Dramatic feature film based on the book.
- Shake Hands with the Devil (2007). Dramatic feature film based on the Lieutenant-General Roméo Dallaire's book Shake Hands with the Devil: The Failure of Humanity in Rwanda (J'ai serré la main du diable: La faillite de l'humanité au Rwanda) (2003).
- Munyurangabo (2007). An orphan of the Rwanda genocide against the Tutsi in 1994 travels from Kigali to the countryside on a quest for justice (from IMDb). Directed by Lee Isaac Chung. Production: Almond Tree Films. Official Selection- Un Certain Regard, Cannes. Grand Jury Prize, AFI.
- Waramutsého! (2008). Dramatic short by Bernard Auguste Kouemo Yanghu. Kabéra finds out that members of his family have participated in the massacre of the family of his good friend. Best African short at African, Asian and Latin American Film Festival 2009.
- The Day God Walked Away (2009).
- Kinyarwanda (2011). The dramatic feature tells the story of hope, redemption and religious tolerance in the midst of the Rwanda genocide against the Tutsi in 1994. It premiered at the 27th Sundance Film Festival in January 2011 where it won the World Cinema Dramatic Audience Award.
- Birds Are Singing in Kigali (2017). Polish film on the Rwanda genocide against the Tutsi in 1994.
- 94 Terror (2018). Keza survived the Tutsi and Hutu slaughter in the Rwanda genocide against the Tutsi in 1994 and recounts the tragedy and her escape from Rwanda to Uganda through the Kagera River.
- Black Earth Rising (2018). British television miniseries
- Ibuka, Justice (2024), Canadian autobiographical animated short film directed by Justice Rutikara, who was born six months before the Rwandan genocide. Rutikara's parents, Valentine Mukasafari and Jean-Claude Rutikara, narrate how their friends sheltered them and a six-month-old Justice from Hutu extremists and helped the family of three escape Rwanda.
- Ben'Imana (2026). Dramatic feature film

== Documentaries ==
- Journey into Darkness (1994). Documentary film shot within Rwanda throughout the genocide, by the journalist Fergal Keane. A BBC Panorama production.
- A Culture of Murder (1994). Documentary film on the Rwanda genocide against the Tutsi in 1994, and the plight of its refugees, by the journalist Steve Bradshaw. A BBC Panorama production.
- The Bloody Tricolor (1995). Documentary film on the involvement of France in Rwanda prior to the Rwanda genocide against the Tutsi in 1994, by the journalist Steve Bradshaw. A BBC Panorama production.
- Rwanda, how history can lead to genocide (1995). Directed by Robert Genoud.
- Chronicle of a Genocide Foretold (1996). Documentary detailing the background and events leading to the Rwandan Genocide, the genocide itself, and its immediate aftermath. Directed by Danièle Lacourse and Yvan Patry, the three-part National Film Board of Canada documentary prominently featured historian Alison Des Forges.
- Valentina's Story (1997). Documentary film on the story of Valentina, a survivor of the Rwanda genocide against the Tutsi in 1994, by the journalist Fergal Keane. A BBC Panorama production.
- When Good Men Do Nothing (1997). Documentary film on the failure of the UN, and the west, by the journalist Steve Bradshaw. A BBC Panorama production.
- Triumph of Evil (1998). Documentary film on the failure of the UN, and the west, an adaption, originally by the journalist Steve Bradshaw. A PBS production.
- L'Afrique en morceaux (2000). Documentary film directed by Jihan El-Tahri
- Umurage (2002). Documentary film directed by Gorka Gamarra about the process of reconciliation between victims and perpetrators in Rwanda.
- Shake Hands with the Devil: The Journey of Roméo Dallaire (2004). Documentary film directed by Peter Raymont. CBC.
- Keepers of Memory (2004). Documentary film directed by the journalist Eric Kabera.
- Ghosts of Rwanda (2005). Documentary film directed by the PBS. Post by the Frontline: The Triumph of Evil website.
- Exploring Rwanda and Darfur (2006). TV Documentary directed by the PBS. Post on the website by The NewsHour with Jim Lehrer.
- Screamers (2006). Documentary by director Carla Garapedian. The documentary examines the repeating pattern of genocide, from the Armenian genocide, to the Holocaust, Cambodia, Bosnia, Rwanda, up to Darfur today. After its theatrical release in the US and Canada, the documentary was screened in the U.S. Congress, British Parliament and European Parliament to raise awareness about genocide education. The full documentary can be watched from the official YouTube channel of the movie Screamers.
- Flowers of Rwanda (2008). Documentary film directed by David Muñoz. Post by the Hibrida Newsgroup, on the website.
- Intended Consequences (2008). By Jonathan Torgovnik on MediaStorm
- Gacaca Film Series (2002–2009) Official site for the documentary film series that includes "My Neighbor My Killer" (Official Selection at Cannes Film Festival), "Gacaca Living Together in Rwanda?," "In Rwanda We Say...The family that does not speak dies" and "The Notebooks of Memory" By Emmy-winner Anne Aghion.
- Flower in the Gun Barrel (2009). Documentary that focuses on the process of reconciliation and forgiveness in post-genocide Rwanda.
- A Generation After Genocide (2010). Documentary film follows three orphaned youth of different classes, gender and ethnicity who are all connected by soccer. A Family-Style Films production. Currently in production. Directed by Torey Kohara and Jonathan Weiman.
- Burden of My Heart (2011). A poetic documentary film about the lives of the survivors and the ways of remembering in Rwanda 16 years after the genocide. A Finnish-Rwandan co-production. Awarded at Tampere film festival and DokLeipzig. Directed by Iris Olsson & Yves Niyongabo
- Duhozanye: A Rwandan Village of Widows (2011). By Karoline Frogner
- If Only We Had Listened (2011). Director: Sean Bloomfield
- The 600: A Soldiers' Story (2019). Documentary film on the little-known story of a surrounded battalion at the Kigali Parliament building that started the counterattack to end the Rwandan Genocide against the Tutsi in 1994, by producer Richard Hall. A Great Blue Productions film.
- Somebody's Child: The Redemption of Rwanda(2005). Documentary film on survival and the aftermath of the genocide, Directed by Felicia Middlebrooks. A Saltshaker Productions film.
