= Assumpta Mugiraneza =

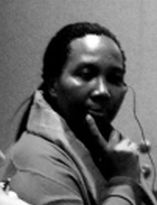

Assumpta Mugiraneza is a Rwandan author and researcher on subjects related to the genocide against the Tutsi. She is a co-founder and Director of IRIBA Center for Multimedia Heritage in Kigali, Rwanda.

Mugiraneza studied Clinical Psychology and Political Science at Paris VIII University.

She co-authored a book with Joël Hubrecht called "Enseigner l'histoire et la prévention des génocides: Peut-on prévenir les crimes contre l'humanité?" and other academic articles on the 1994 genocide.

She worked with Anne Aghion on her films about Rwanda's Gacaca justice and social reconstruction process, including: «Mon voisin, mon tueur» (My Neighbor, My Killer),"Gacacas Vivre ensemble au Rwanda” and “Au Rwanda, on dit….La famille qui ne parle pas meurt." (In Rwanda We Say…The Family That Does Not Speak Dies).
