= Rwanda Film Festival =

Annual film festival

- Location: Kigali, Rwanda
- Founded: 2005
- Most recent: October 2019
- Awards: Silverback Awards
- Language: International

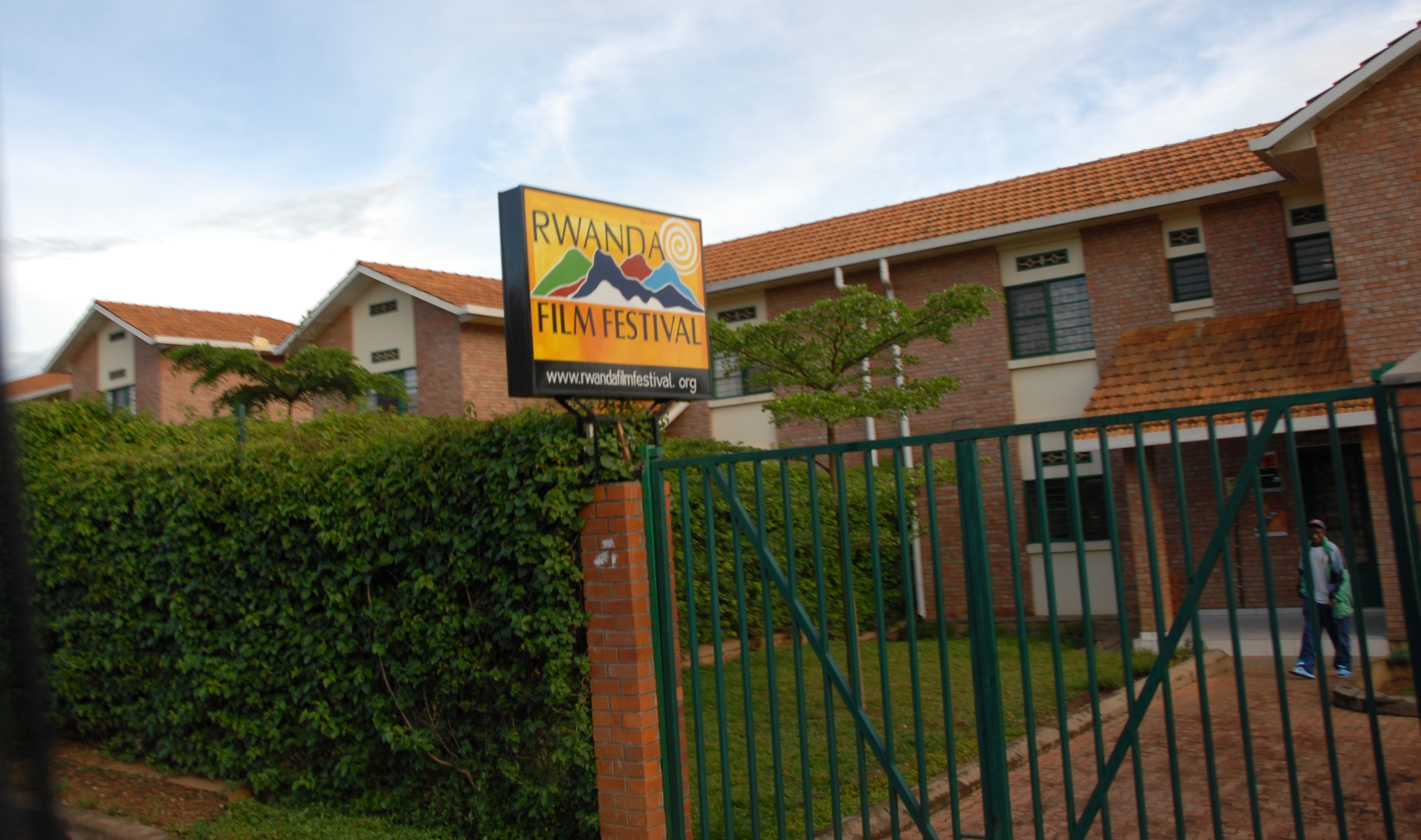
Rwanda Film Institute Sign

The Rwanda Film Festival, also known as Hillywood, was a film festival held annually in July in Kigali, Rwanda, between 2005 and 2019. It was a competitive festival, offering awards known as the Silverback Awards.

== History ==
The Rwanda Film Festival was founded in 2005 by filmmaker and journalist Eric Kabera.

In 2009, Kabera said that the festival would move away from focusing only on the issue of the 1994 Rwandan genocide, to exploring films about other social issues of modern Rwanda.

The 2012 edition in 2012 invited films from all over the world under the theme "My Voice, My face, My soul, My Identity".

The 15th edition was the last, taking place in October 2019.

== Description ==
Presented by the Rwanda Cinema Center, an organisation that aims to promote the country's film industry, the Rwanda Film Festival was a travelling festival. Due to Kabera's desire to show the films to as large an audience as possible, the festival was held not only in the capital city, Kigali, but festival films, especially ones made by Rwandan filmmakers, were also shown on large inflatable screens in rural areas throughout the country.

The name "Hillywood", a portmanteau word combining Rwanda's nickname "land of a thousand hills" with Hollywood, was adopted to refer to the Rwanda Film Festival as well as the Rwandan film industry.

It was a competitive festival, with several awards given.

== Awards ==
The Silverback Awards were launched after the Silverback Sponsorship from London firm Hard Media with the Rwanda Film Festival. In 2012, the award categories were:

- Hillywood Award
- East Africa Award
- Best Documentary Film
- Best Feature Film
- Best Short Film
- Best Director
- Resilience Award
- Rwanda as Seen Around the World
- Audience Award
- Out of Africa: Films on Africa

== See also ==
- List of films about the Rwandan genocide
- Kigali Cine Junction, a film festival inaugurated in 2023
- Urusaro International Women Film Festival
