= Kaneza =

Kaneza is both a feminine given name and a surname. Notable people with the name include:

- Kaneza Schaal, American actress and stage director
- Floriane Kaneza, Burundian filmmaker, screenwriter, and producer
