= The Ice People =

The Ice People may refer to:-

- The Ice People (Gee novel), novel by Maggie Gee
- The Ice People (Barjavel novel), French novel by René Barjavel
- Ice People, documentary film directed by Anne Aghion
- The Legend of the Ice People, the novel series by Margit Sandemo
