= Abigail Harm =

- Directed by: Lee Isaac Chung
- Screenplay by: Samuel Gray Anderson; Lee Isaac Chung
- Produced by: Eugene Suen; Samuel Gray Anderson
- Starring: Amanda Plummer
- Cinematography: Lee Isaac Chung
- Edited by: Lee Isaac Chung
- Music by: Bryan Senti
- Release date: October 7, 2012 (Busan)
- Running time: 80 minutes
- Country: United States
- Language: English

Abigail Harm is a 2012 American drama film written by Samuel Gray Anderson and Lee Isaac Chung, directed by Chung and starring Amanda Plummer.

== Cast ==
- Amanda Plummer as Abigail Harm
- Tetsuo Kuramochi as the Companion
- Will Patton as The Visitor/Narrator
- Burt Young as Mr. Warren

== Production ==
According to Chung, "Production started in late September of 2011 for 24 days."

== Release ==
The film was shown at the Busan International Film Festival on October 7, 2012. Then it was released on August 30, 2013 in Manhattan.

== Reception ==
The film has a 42% rating on Rotten Tomatoes based on 12 reviews. Diego Semerene of Slant Magazine awarded the film three stars out of five.

Manohla Dargis of The New York Times gave the film a negative review and wrote, "Abigail Harm tracks the lonely lulls and strange eruptions in one desperately uninteresting life."
