= Cuba, an African Odyssey =

- Directed by: Jihan El-Tahri
- Screenplay by: Jihan El-Tahri
- Produced by: Temps Noir
- Cinematography: Frank Meter Lehmann
- Edited by: Gilles Bovon
- Music by: Les Frères Guissé
- Release date: 3 October 2007
- Running time: 190 minutes (Part 1: 97 minutes; Part 2: 93 minutes)
- Country: France

Cuba, an African Odyssey is a French 2007 documentary film directed by Jihan El-Tahri. The film was shown on Arte in two parts and released on DVD on 3 October 2007.

== Synopsis ==
From the early 1960s to the early 1990s, Cuba was instrumental in supporting a number of leftist insurgencies and nationalist movements on the African continent, which it justified under the communist theory of proletarian internationalism. The documentary focuses on Cuba's role in the decolonization of Africa and the extent of its military intervention in several postcolonial African conflicts, such as the South African Border War, Angolan Civil War, and the Ogaden War.

The film screened at multiple festivals including Vues d'Afrique, FESPACO, FIPADOCS, and Sunny Side of the Doc.
