= Survivors Fund =

Charitable humanitarian organization

Survivors Fund (SURF)
- Founded: 30 July 1997; 29 years ago
- Founded at: London, England
- Type: International NGO
- Registration no.: 1065705
- Purpose: "Survivors Fund (SURF) works to rebuild the lives of survivors of the genocide against the Tutsi in Rwanda."
- Headquarters: Kigali, Rwanda
- Region served: Rwanda
- Chief Executive: Samuel Munderere
- Website: www.survivors-fund.org.uk

Survivors Fund (SURF), founded in 1997, represents and supports survivors of the Genocide against the Tutsi in Rwanda (Rwandan genocide) in Rwanda. It is the principal international charity with a specific remit to assist survivors of the Genocide against the Tutsi in Rwanda, and has offices in London and Kigali. It is registered with the Charity Commission for England & Wales.

The charity supports projects for survivors in Rwanda in fields including education, healthcare, shelter, justice and memory. Campaigns have included raising awareness of the threat to survivors resulting from the release of prisoners through gacaca.

== Founder ==
Survivors Fund (SURF) was founded by Mary Kayitesi Blewitt, a British citizen of Rwandan origin, at the behest of survivors after losing 50 family members during the genocide in 1994. At the end of the genocide in July 1994, Blewitt volunteered for the Ministry of Rehabilitation in Rwanda, working for eight months helping to bury the dead and to support the survivors. This formative experience inspired her to set up Survivors Fund (SURF) on her return to the UK to ensure that survivors received aid, assistance and support, and that their voices would be heard by people around the world. Her work has meant that she has received numerous awards such as the Pilkington Award by the Women of the Year Lunch & Assembly and appointment as an OBE.

== Fields of work ==
Survivors Fund (SURF) works to address the numerous challenges still faced by survivors of the Genocide against the Tutsi in Rwanda, including:

- Trauma relating to the impact of the genocide, and continued sense of insecurity
- Health problems resulting from the genocide, in particular the effects of old age
- Poverty particularly resulting from property destroyed and land taken in the genocide
- Shelter and lack of appropriate affordable, safe housing resulting from the genocide
- Justice for survivors, particularly resulting from the lack of support to enforce their rights
- Youth unemployment which is acute among survivors and second-generation survivors

Healthcare

Survivors still suffer from genocide related physical injuries, mental health illnesses and HIV and AIDS which require specialist care. Many survivors were infected with HIV and AIDS during the genocide, and still require support to access antiretroviral treatment. There is also a need to provide support to survivors to afford Mutuelle de Sante (public health insurance).

Education

Survivors have benefited from access to schooling since the establishment of the Government Assistance Fund for Vulnerable Genocide Survivors (FARG) in 1998. Over 100,000 survivors completed secondary school with support from FARG, of which a further 33,000 survivors have been funded to complete higher education. However, second-generation survivors (in particular children born to women survivors raped during the genocide) did not benefit from FARG support and have required additional support to secure the same educational opportunities afforded to survivors. There is a particular need for more vocational training to enable school graduates to transition into employment.

Housing

There are still many vulnerable survivors who have no accommodation or a decent place to sleep, often having to live a transitory life, moving from place to place to seek shelter, with an estimated 2,100 houses in need of urgent renovation nationwide. This results in high anxiety and hopelessness. Most of these families are very poor; left to deal with the consequences of genocide, and general ill health. Many of the needy have no skills to acquire jobs. Even those in employment cannot afford to build a house because building materials are too costly or they find it increasingly difficult to find the resources to build houses of their own, to buy or to rent. Without shelter security and rehabilitation becomes impossible.

Justice

Personal security for survivors in Rwanda is an ongoing concern, as many must live side-by-side with men who raped them and killed their families, as the perpetrators of the genocide are being released back into the community. The country no longer has the resource to continue to keep these men incarcerated, and so by admitting guilt at local gacaca (community-based) trials they are now free. The insecurity of survivors is fuelled by intimidation, harassment, death threats and killings by the continuing campaign to release prisoners.

Memory

Nearly thirty years after genocide in Rwanda, the remains of many victims of genocide are still to be buried. Many of them still lie in trenches, abandoned latrines, churches, on the hills and many other places - some known, some yet to be discovered. Many of these locations are revealed by genocide suspects currently held in prisons that have confessed to involvement in the genocide (through gacaca). Alongside the burial programme, a programme has undertaken with the USC Shoah Foundation Institute to record the testimonies of survivors.

== Situation for survivors today ==
Nearly thirty years after the genocide, Rwanda has made significant progress in rebuilding internally, but the many scars remain fresh. The legacy of genocide touches almost every aspect of life for the survivors. In addition to recurring psychological trauma suffered by many from their experiences, survivors of the genocide face multiple difficulties. Many are impoverished and face complex health problems, such as HIV and AIDS, as a direct result of the violence perpetrated against them during the genocide. Survivors are still threatened with violence, attacked or killed by former perpetrators, and for many a climate of fear persists. Rebuilding their lives alongside individuals responsible for murder and rape is a difficult reality faced by all survivors in Rwanda.

There is an estimated 300,000 survivors in Rwanda, of which 120,000 are considered by the Rwandan Ministry of Affairs to be very vulnerable and 35% suffer from Post-Traumatic Stress Disorder (PTSD. Besides support given to survivors through SURF over the last 25 years, the only other sustainable and significant funding for survivors has come from the Rwandan Government, which channels supports to vulnerable survivors through the Government of Rwanda Social Security Board.

== SURF’s partners ==
SURF collaborates closely with key partners such as IBUKA (National Umbrella of Survivors’ Organisations), AVEGA (Association of Widows of the Genocide), AERG (National Student's Association of Genocide Survivors), GAERG (National Survivor's Association of Graduate Students), Uyisenga N'Manzi (Organization of Child Survivors with HIV/AIDS), and Solace Ministries (Christian Survivors Support Organization).
