= Se le movió el piso: A portrait of Managua =

Se le movió el piso: un retrato de Managua
- Screenshot of the buildings of Managua, Nicaragua
- Directed by: Anne Aghion
- Produced by: Anne Aghion
- Edited by: Martine Zévort
- Distributed by: Chaz Productions
- Release date: 1996
- Running time: 42 minutes
- Country: Nicaragua
- Languages: Spanish and English with English subtitles

Se le movió el piso: A portrait of Managua is a documentary film by Anne Aghion about the many layers of destruction that the people in Managua, Nicaragua endured: the 1972 Nicaragua earthquake, four decades of dictatorship and many years of war. Most of the film was centered on the Salazar theater and the many families that lived there. Sofía Montenegro, a journalist and a former Sandinista, was also interviewed as a person who lived and experienced the challenges of the Managuans.

Directed by Anne Aghion and produced by Chaz Productions, this 1996 film won the Coral Award for "Best Non-Latin American Documentary on Latin America" at the Havana Film Festival in Havana, Cuba. Filmed in Managua, the language of Se le movió el piso: A portrait of Managua is Spanish and English with English subtitles.
