= Gacaca, Living Together Again In Rwanda? =

- Screenshot depicting a Rwandan man testifying before a Gacaca court.
- Directed by: Anne Aghion
- Produced by: Philip Brooks; Laurent Bocahut; Anne Aghion
- Edited by: Nadia Ben Rachid
- Distributed by: Dominant 7, Gacaca Productions, and Planète
- Release date: 2002
- Running time: 55 minutes
- Country: Rwanda
- Language: Kinyarwanda with English subtitles

Gacaca, Living Together Again In Rwanda? is the first documentary film in a trilogy by Anne Aghion examining the aftermath of the Rwandan genocide. Directed by Anne Aghion and produced by Dominant 7, Gacaca Productions, and Planète, this 2002 film won UNESCO's Fellini Prize. Filmed in Rwanda, the language of Gacaca is Kinyarwanda with English subtitles. In Kinyarwanda, gacaca means "short grass", which denotes the outdoor public location of the perpetrator trials in Rwanda.

== Synopsis ==
The first film in this trilogy ventures into the rural heart of Rwanda, where one of the world’s boldest experiments in reconciliation took place after the Rwandan genocide: the Gacaca (Ga-CHA-cha) tribunals. These are a new form of citizen-based justice aimed at unifying this country of 8 million people after the 1994 genocide that claimed over 800,000 lives in 100 days. While world attention is focused on the unfolding procedures, award-winning documentarian Anne Aghion bypasses the usual interviews with politicians and international aid workers, skips the statistics, and goes directly to the emotional core of the story, talking one-on-one with survivors and accused killers alike. In this powerful, compassionate and insightful film, with almost no narration, and using only original footage, she captures first-hand how ordinary people struggle to find a future after cataclysm.

The other two films in the trilogy are "In Rwanda We Say…The Family That Does Not Speak Dies" (2004), and "The Notebooks of Memory" (2009).
