= Natacha Muziramakenga =

Rwandan actress, artist, poet (born 1984)

- Born: 1984 (age 41–42); Rwanda
- Other name: Miziguruka
- Citizenship: Rwanda
- Occupation: Artist Actress
- Known for: Acting
- Notable work: Poetry Acting curatorship
- Television: Neptune Frost Grey Matter Small Country: An African Childhood

Natacha Muziramakenga, also known as Miziguruka (born 1984), is a Rwandan multidisciplinary artist and creative director. Her work includes poetry, acting, and curatorship. Her recurring themes include resilience, mental health, human rights, feminism, and the representation of Black women.

== Career ==
Muziramakenga has acted in the films Neptune Frost; Petit Pays, also known Small Country: An African Childhood; Grey Matter; and Un dimanche à Kigali, also known as A Sunday in Kigali.

She contributed to the play Learning Feminism from Rwanda, touring Germany and Switzerland between 2020 and 2021. She authored Méandres, and created performances combining video art and poetry at Berlin's Frequencies Festival. She presented her work as a contemporary curator in Seoul in 2023.

Her works have been published in the magazine Wasafari and in a collective work Au dessous des Volcans, published by Sepia.
