= My Neighbor, My Killer =

2009 film

- Film poster
- Directed by: Anne Aghion
- Written by: Anne Aghion
- Produced by: Anne Aghion
- Cinematography: James Kakwerere; Linette Frewin; Claire Bailly du Bois; Mathieu Hagnery
- Edited by: Nadia Ben Rachid
- Production company: Gacaca Productions
- Release date: May 2009
- Running time: 80 minutes
- Countries: France; United States
- Languages: Kinyarwanda with English and French subtitles

My Neighbor, My Killer (French: Mon voisin, mon tueur) is a 2009 French-American documentary film directed by Anne Aghion that focuses on the process of the Gacaca courts, a citizen-based justice system that was put into place in Rwanda after the 1994 genocide. Filmed over ten years, it reflects on how people can live together after such a traumatic experience. Through the story and the words of the inhabitants of a small rural community, we see survivors and killers learn how to coexist.

== Critical reception and awards ==
The film was an Official Selection at the 2009 Cannes Film Festival, the winner of the Human Rights Watch's Nestor Almendros Prize for courage in filmmaking, a nominee for the 2009 Gotham Best Documentary Award and the winner of the best documentary at Montreal Black Festival. The film has been shown at film festivals and universities around the world, including in Rwanda. It is rated 100% on Rotten Tomatoes.

My Neighbor, My Killer is the feature length based on the Gacaca Series, composed of three films that Anne Aghion made over the years in Rwanda, one of which - "In Rwanda We Say…The Family That Does Not Speak Dies" - received an Emmy Award.

Reviews and public reception of My Neighbor, My Killer highlight both the emotional power and analytical strength of the film. Nick Davis, a film critic, praises the documentary's observational style that allows the authentic experience of Rwandans to unfold naturally. However, he also criticizes how a lack of narration can make it difficult for viewers to grasp the larger historical context. An academic review by Violane Baraduc and Sahondra Limane emphasizes the thematic power of this film, such as its connection to the politics of language and memory.

== Festivals ==
- Human Rights Watch Film Festival
- Cannes Film Festival, 2009
- San Francisco International Film Festival, 2009
- Vancouver International Film Festival, 2009
- Chicago International Film Festival, 2009
- Honorable Mention: One Future Prize, Munich Film Festival, 2009
- Fribourg International Film Festival, 2020
- Nominee: Best Documentary, Gotham Awards, 2009
