= Mashariki African Film Festival =

Film festival in Rwanda

Mashariki Africa Film Festival (MAFF) is a Rwandan-based film event that highlights and awards films by Africans and African diaspora. The word 'Mashariki' means 'East' in Kiswahili. The first edition of the festival was in 2015.

The event did not take place in 2020 and 2021 due to the COVID-19.pandemic

The festival was founded by Tresor Senga. Floriane Kaneza was its artistic director from 2016 to 2018.

== 2015 ==
Opening Night	Tapis Rouge Kantarama Gahigiri And Fred Baillif, Swiss, 2014
Feature Film Competition	Virgem Margarida Licínio Azevedo, Mozambique, 2012, 87 Minutes Impunidade Criminosas Sol de Carvalho, Mozambique 2013, 74 Minutes Durban Poison Andrew Worsdale, South Africa 2013, 94 Minutes W.A.K.A Françoise Ellong, France, 2014, 90 Minutes Dakar Trottoirs Hubert Laba Ndao, Senegal, 2013 Dust & Fortunes Justice Chapwanya Mokoena, Zimbabwe, 2013, 88 Minutes Imani Caroline Kamya, Uganda/ Sweden, 2010 The Route Jayant Maru, Uganda, 2013, 67 Minutes Umutoma Jean Kwezi, Rwanda, 2014, 72 Minutes Amaguru N'amaboko / The Feet And The Hands Roland Lewis Ndikumana, Burundi The Springboard Joseph Ndayisenga, Burundi, 2014, 63 Minutes Ubutorwa Muniru Habiyakare, 90 Minutes
Short Film Competition	Crossing Lines Karemangingo Ishimwe Samuel, Rwanda 2014, 29 Minutes, Fiction Akaliza Keza Philbert Aimé Mbabazi, Rwanda 2014 Rayila Mutiganda Janvier, Rwanda, 2014, 7 Fiction Forbidden Talk Uwimbabazi Odile, Rwanda, 2014, 25 Min Deceit Mark Wambui, Kenya, 2014, 11 Minutes, Fiction Before And After Likario Wainaina, Kenya, 2014, 21 Minutes, Fiction The Audition Likario Wainaina, Kenya, 2014, 6 Minutes, Fiction Letters Home Brian Munene, Country,2014, Duration, Fiction My Faith Bruce Makau, Kenya, 2014, 24 Minutes, Fiction Tiktok Usama Mukwaya, Uganda, 2014, 19 Minutes, Fiction After The Death Of My Husband Malikonge Richard, Burundi, 2014, 17 Min 16 Sec, Documentary Majambere The Fighter Evrad Niyomwungeri, Burundi, 2014, 13 Min 48 Sec, Documentary Skin Deep Michelle Kamunyo, Kenya, 2014, Duration, Documentary Kazi Ni Kazi - All Work Is Valuable Nsanzemariya Magnifique, Rwanda, 7 Minutes Swag & Swing Kinani Peace, Rwanda, 15 Minutes Gasore Dukuze Marie Claire, Rwanda, 9 Minutes
Best East African Actor	Iradukunda Pacifique from Rwandan Short Film Gasore
Best East African Actress	Veronica Washeke from Kenyan Short Film My Faith
Best National Short Film	Crossing Lines, (Rwanda)
Jury Special Mention East African Best Short Film	Majambere The Fighter (Burundi)
Best East African Short Film	My Faith (Kenya)
Best East African Documentary	The Springboard, (Burundi)
Best East African Narrative Feature Film	The Route, (Uganda)
Best Director	Francoise Ellong, W.A.K.A.
Best Film	Virgem Margarida, (Mozambique)

== 2017 ==
Opening night	La Piroque (Small boat) Moussa Toure
Best Short Fiction Film	It Works Emmanuel Harris Munezero (Rwanda)
Best Short Documentary	Football For Peace Habib Kanobana (Rwanda)
Best East African Short Fiction Film	Camel’s Back Ari Michelle Mboya (Kenya)
Best Short Documentary	Water to Dust Mitchelle Jangara (Kenya)
Best African Short Film	Maman Maimouna Doucoure (Senegal)
Best Feature Fiction	N.G.O. Arnold Aganze (Uganda)
Closing film	Tey Alain Gomis

== 2019 ==
Best Feature Film	Veronica’s Wish Nisha Kalema and Rehema Nanfuka
Best East African Short Film.	Sunday Angella Emurwon
Best African Short Film	Communion, Patience Nitumwesigye
Best East African Short Film	Communion, Patience Nitumwesigye

*These are nominations

== 2020 ==
The festival did not hold in 2020 due to the COVID-19 pandemic.

== 2022 ==
In 2022, Mashariki African Film Festival was held from 26 November 2022 to 2 December 2022.

MASHARIKI OFFICIAL AWARDS
Best Documentary Award	We Students Directed by Rafiki Fariala
Best Short Film	Supastaz Directed by Ophrah Yougi
Best Feature Film	Maria Kristu - The Bumpa Story Directed by Paul S. Wilo

SIGNIS JURY AWARDS
Best Film	KAFACOH Directed by Doreen Mirembe
East African Talent Award	A COLORFUL LIFE Directed by Lionel Nishimwe

IZIWACU AWARDS
Best Short Film WBI	LOVE ME Directed by Claudine Uwamahoro
Best Short Film Huye	Before I Treat My First Patient Directed by DUTERIMBERE Marie Aime
Best Short Film Musanze	AMAYIRABIRI Directed by Samuel Uwizeyimana
Best Short Film Muhanga	IMPAMVU Directed by UWERA MARIE JEANNE
Best Short Film Rubavu	CLASSROOM Directed by ABDOUL Nsengiyumva
Best Actor	FURAHA JOHNSON JOSEPH - AFTER
Best Actress	UWONKUNDA MUGOBEKAZI RAISSA - Breathing
