= Burden of My Heart =

2011 Finnish documentary film

- Finnish: Sydämeni taakka
- Directed by: Yves Montand Niyongabo
- Release date: 2011
- Country: Finland
- Language: English

Burden of My Heart (Finnish: Sydämeni taakka) is a 2011 Finnish documentary film about the surviving victims of the genocide in Rwanda. It was directed by Yves Montand Niyongabo. The documentary was chosen for premiere at the 2011 DOK Leipzig film festival. The documentary also received the Jury Youth Prize and Best Domestic Documentary Award at the Tempo film festival in Finland.
