= Yves Montand Niyongabo =

Rwandan film director

- Born: Burundi
- Occupation: Film director
- Notable work: Munyurangabo
- Awards: Organisation internationale de la Francophonie Prize, 2013

Yves Montand Niyongabo is a Burundian-Rwandan film director.

== Background ==
Yves was born and raised in Burundi. He later moved to Rwanda where he quit law studies for film making. He has worked as a production coordinator for the 2017 film Munyurangabo. In 2010, Niyongabo was selected for a film workshop organized by CPH:Dox in Denmark.

== Filmography ==
- Maibobo (2010)
- Slim Land (2012)
- Giti – Paradise in Hell (2014)
- The Invincible (2014)
- Munyurangabo (2017)

== Awards ==
- Organisation internationale de la Francophonie (OIF) Prize, 2013
- Goethe Institut Best Scriptwriter Award, 2013
