= Kivu Ruhorahoza =

Film director (born 1982)

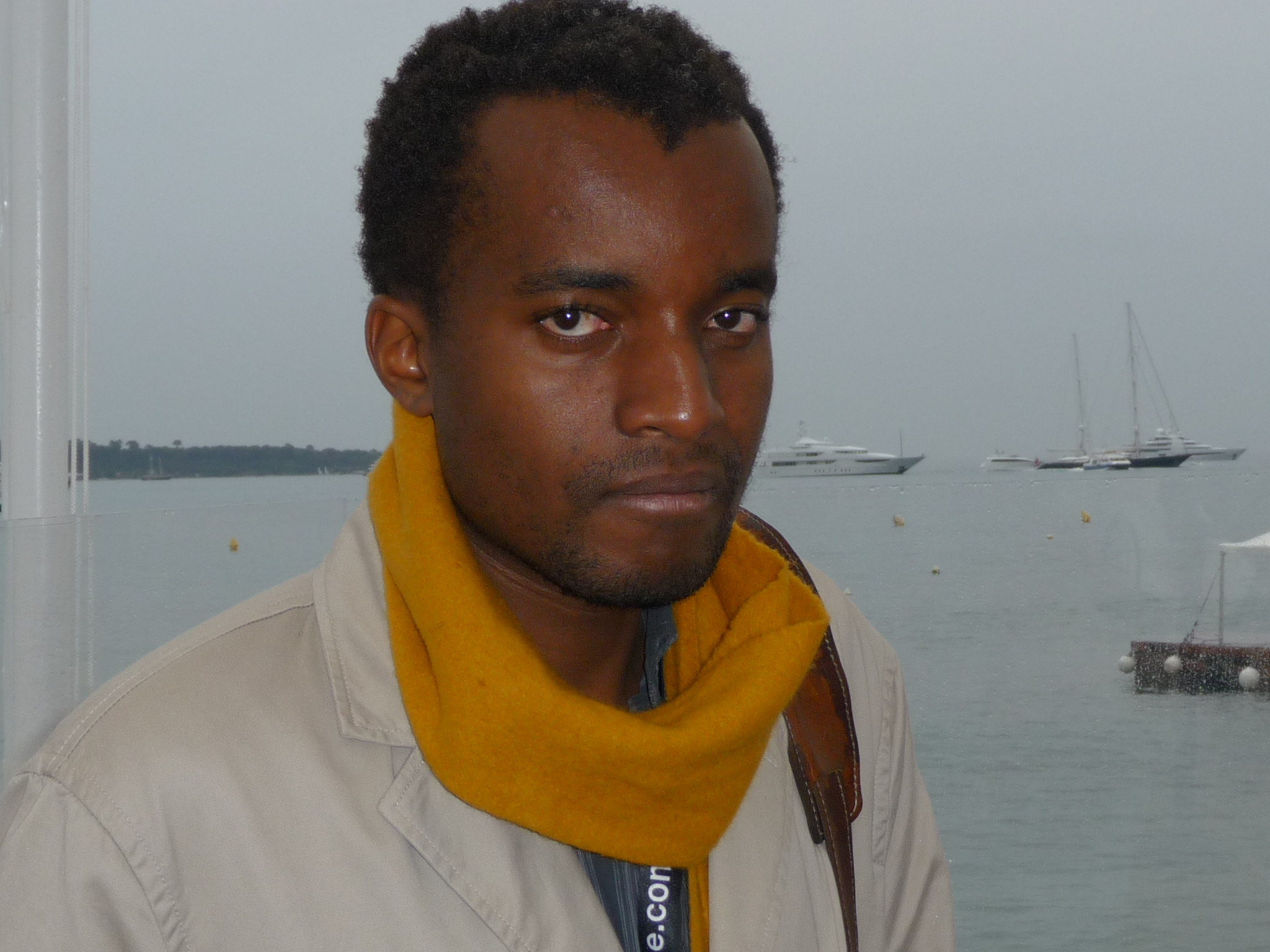
- Born: 6 December 1982 (age 43); Kigali, Rwanda
- Occupations: Film director, screenwriter and producer
- Notable work: Grey Matter

Kivu Ruhorahoza is a Rwandese film director, writer and producer. One of Rwanda's most prominent film directors, he first gained international attention in 2011 with Grey Matter, Rwanda's first feature film written and directed by a Rwandan. The film won the Jury Special Mention for Best Emerging Filmmaker at the 2011 Tribeca Film Festival and the Ecumenical Jury special mention at the 2011 Warsaw Film Festival. It also won the Grand Prize of the Tübingen French Film Festival, Best Director and Signis Award of the Cordoba African Film Festival and the Jury Special Prize of the Khouribga African Film Festival in Morocco.

== Early life and education ==
Ruhorahoza was born in Kigali on December 6, 1982. He grew up in a Muslim family and studied the Koran, describing the form of Islam he was brought up in as moderate.

Originally intent on becoming a novelist, he changed his plans to filmmaking as a teenager after being inspired by Roger Gnoan M’bala’s Au Nom du Christ and Cedric Kahn’s L’Ennui .

At the time of his university studies in the early 2000s, there were no film schools in Rwanda, nor university-level literature programs; as a result, he enrolled in law school, before dropping out to pursue opportunities in the audiovisual industry.

== Career ==
Ruhorahoza started his career in 2004 as a production assistant to Eric Kabera, a Rwandan producer and film festival organizer. He was promoted to production manager, a role in which he supported the news crews of international networks such as the BBC and CNN when on assignment in Rwanda.

His first film was released in 2017. The short, Confession, won the City of Venice Award at the African, Asian and Latin American Film Festival in Milan and was screened at the Venice Film Festival. His second short film, Lost in the South (2008), won Best African Short Film at the Vues D'Afriques Festival in Montreal and was screened at the Rotterdam International Film Festival. The documentary Rwanda 15 followed in 2010. The film follows New York city-based saxophonist Jeremy Danneman, a grandson of a Holocaust survivor, who travels to Rwanda on the 15th anniversary of the Genocide Against the Tutsi. The film had its world premier at the 2010 Zanzibar International Film Festival and screened at the 2011 Vision Festival in New York.

In 2011 Ruhorahoza released his first feature Grey Matter, a film about trauma and madness in the aftermath of the Rwandan genocide. Produced in Rwanda, the film screened at festivals including Tribeca Film Festival, Melbourne International Film Festival, Warsaw Film Festival, Rotterdam Film Festival, Dubai Film Festival, Durban International Film Festival, Göteborg Film Festival and the Rio de Janeiro International Film Festival.

Ruhorahoza's second feature film, Things of the Aimless Wanderer was released in 2015. Structured as a triptych, the film moves between a late-nineteenth-century colonial encounter and two contemporary African settings, addressing the relationship between the West and Africa. The film was shot on a BlackMagic Cinema Camera with an entirely local Rwandan crew. It premiered at the Sundance Film Festival in the New frontier program.

His next feature, Europa, "based on a True Story" (2019) takes place in London and is centered on a love triangle between a British couple and Nigerian asylum-seeker against the backdrop of Brexit and anti-immigrant debates.

His fourth feature, Father's Day (2022) was inspired by a new trend celebrating Father's Day in Rwanda. The film, similar to Things of the Aimless Wanderer and Grey Matter, is structured as three separate stories. Each has a flawed father at its core, who, according to the director, represents a "type of masculinity that is dying out" in Rwanda. The film was shot on a micro-budget of around $50,000. It premiered at the Berlin International Film Festival where it was nominated for the Encounters Award.

== Distinctions ==
He was a 2022-23 McMillan-Stewart Fellow in Distinguished Filmmaking at Harvard
