= Behind This Convent =

- Release date: 2008
- Country: Rwanda

Behind This Convent is a 2008 post Rwandan genocide documentary directed by Gilbert Ndahayo. It was premiered at the 28th Verona African Film Festival.

== Synopsis ==
On April 10, 1994, in the small town of Astrida in Rwanda, Génocidaires break into a convent. They loot and take hostage along the road. Then they take 200 Tutsis and execute them in a courtyard behind the convent. Returning home as a 13 year old, Ndahayo discovered the bodies of his family at a pit in his backyard.

== Awards ==
- Verona Award for Best African Film
- Signis Commendation for Best African documentary at Zanzibar International Film Festival (2008)
