= Françoise Ellong =

Cameroonian film director and writer

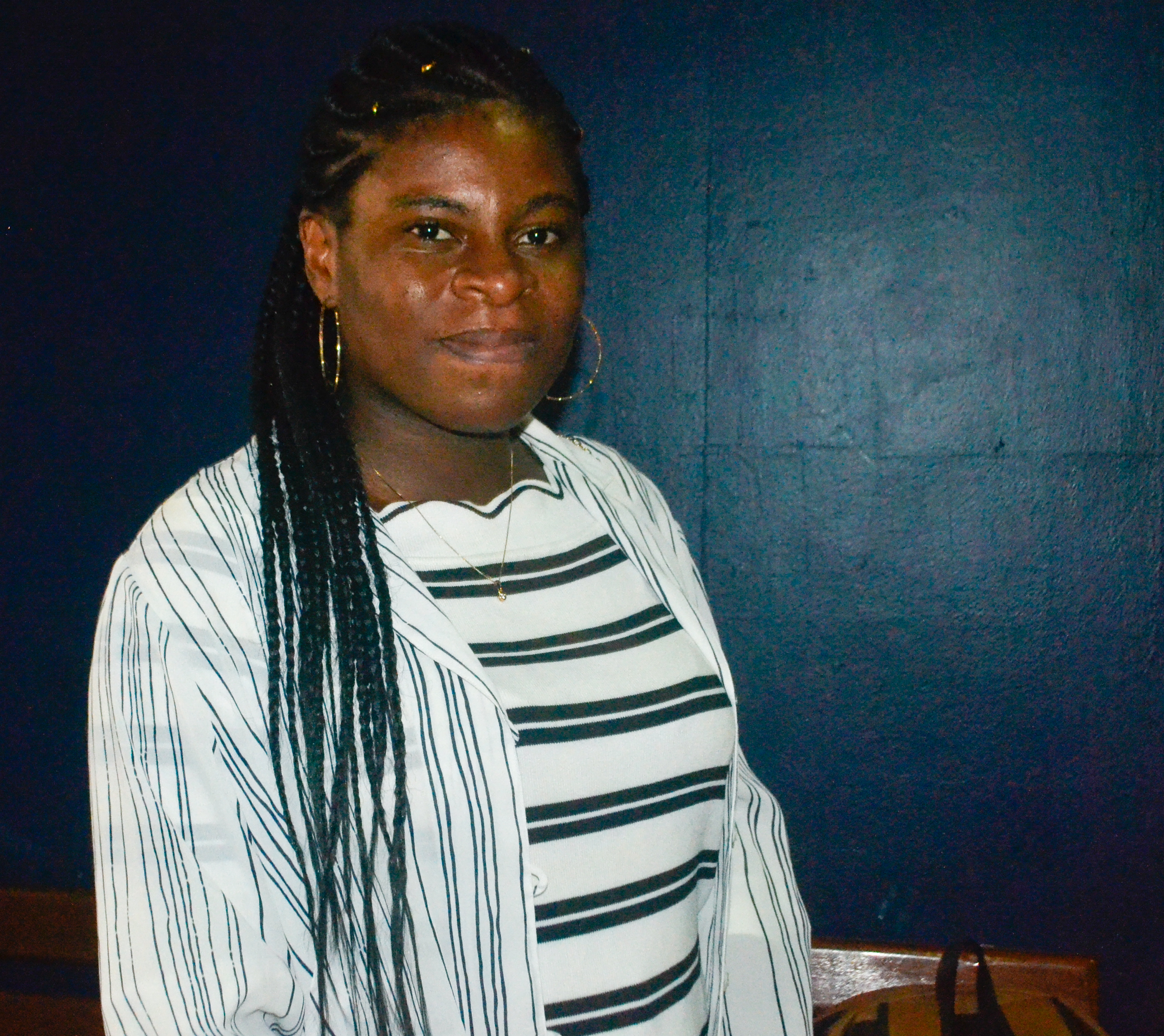
- Francoise Ellong in 2021
- Born: February 8, 1988 (age 38); Douala
- Occupations: Film director, writer
- Notable work: W.A.K.A. (2013)

Françoise Ellong (born 8 February 1988) is a Cameroonian film director and writer.

== Biography ==
Ellong was born in Douala, Cameroon in 1988. At the age of 11, she moved to Brunoy to live with an uncle, and she wrote her first story. Ellong participated in a contest for young French-speaking writers in 2002. As a result of the contest, she developed an interest in screenwriting.

In 2006, her first short film, Les Colocs, was released. Ellong directed her first feature film, W.A.K.A, in 2013. It was written by Séraphin Kakouang, based on an original story by Ellong. W.A.K.A received the Special Jury Prize at the Festival du Cinéma Africain de Khouribga, as well as the Dikalo Award at the International Pan-African Film Festival in Cannes. It was screened at the beginning of the Ecrans Noirs Festival. Her second feature film, Buried, came out in 2020. It is about the reunion of childhood friends and the game that exposed secrets. Filmed in the village of Nkassomo, it was inspired by a news report she saw on television.

In addition to screenwriting and directing, Ellong published the novel "Journal Intime d'Un Meurtrier" in 2008. In 2016, she launched the blog "Le Film Camerounais", which led to the LFC awards. Ellong called for a boycott of Thierry Ntamack's acting camps in 2020, after Ntamack said only 10 percent of Cameroonian actors were good.

== Filmography ==
- 2006: Les Colocs (short film, writer/director)
- 2007: Dade (short film, writer/director)
- 2008: Miseria (short film, writer/director)
- 2009: Big woman don't cry (short film, writer/director)
- 2010: Nek (short film, writer/director)
- 2011: At Close Range (short film, writer/director)
- 2011: When Soukhina disappeared (short film, writer/director)
- 2012: Now and them (short film, writer/director)
- 2013: W.A.K.A (director)
- 2017: Ashia (short film, writer/director)
- 2020: Buried (writer/director)
