= Miss Shanel =

Rwandan singer and actress (born 1985)

Nirere Shanel
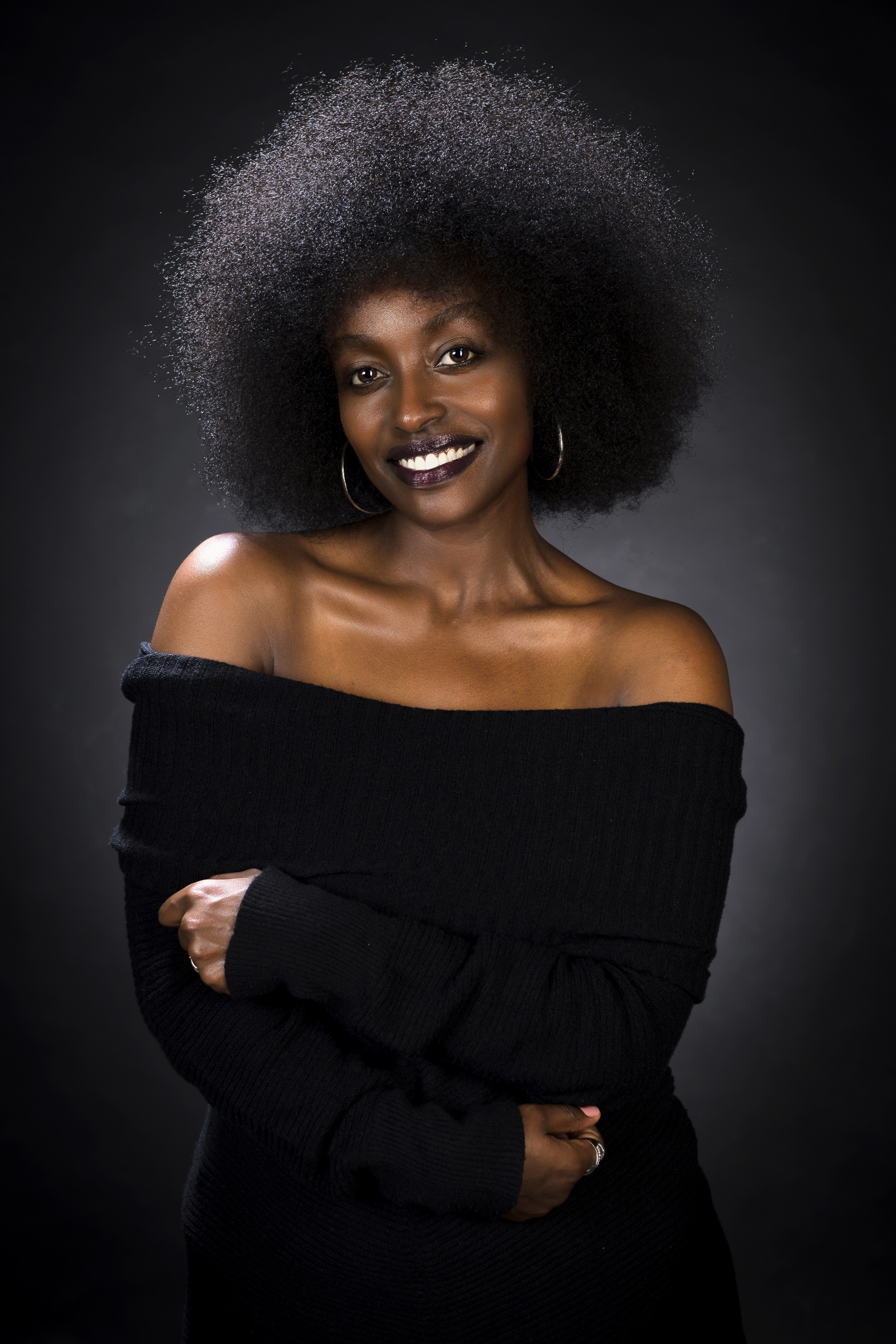
- Nirere in 2017

Background information
- Born: Ruth Nirere
- Origin: Rwanda
- Genres: R&B; traditional
- Occupation: Singer
- Instrument: Vocals
- Years active: 1998–present

Ruth Nirere, better known as Nirere Shanel (previously Miss Shanel), is a Rwandan singer and actress.

== History ==
=== Early years ===
She began singing as a child and released two successful singles, both meant to comfort and commemorate the survivors and victims of the Rwandan genocide, while a secondary school student. Her songs are regularly played during the annual Genocide commemoration period, and in 2004 she won the "Never Again" competition to select the best commemoration artist.

=== Musical career ===
She had a major hit in 1998 at the age of 13 with the zouk tune "Ndarota!" off her debut album of the same name released earlier that year. In 2004 she released two a cappella singles to wide success, raising her to national celebrity. Her music during this period reflected a mix of genres, including R&B, soul, zouk and acoustic music.

In 2009 she released her debut album, entitled Narrow Road. This album and her subsequent music reflect more traditional Rwandan musical styles. She has collaborated on singles with numerous Rwandan, Kenyan and Ugandan artists.

In 2012 she gave a series of performances for Rwandan peacekeepers stationed in Darfur, Sudan.

In 2013 she moved to France to complete a two-year course in vocal performance.

In 2017 she plays in the movie The Mercy of the Jungle starring Marc Zinga and Stephane Bak, produced by Joël Karekezi

== Awards ==
Miss Shanel has been nominated three times for a Pearl of Africa Music Award in 2006, 2007 and 2008. In 2009 she won a Salax Award in the category of Best Female Artist.

== Acting career ==
In addition to her musical career, Nirere has launched a successful career as an actress. She starred in the films Avenir; Long Coat, directed by Edouard Bamporiki; and Matière grise, directed by Kivu Ruhorahoza. She starred in Le jour ou Dieu est parti en voyage (2009), which recounts stories of the Rwandan genocide. Nirere's performance earned her the prize for Best Actress at the Thessaloniki International Film Festival in Greece and at the International Film Festival Bratislava in Slovakia. In 2011 she starred in the Rwandan film Grey Matter that deals with the aftermath of the genocide in Rwanda.
