= L'Afrique en morceaux =

2000 French documentary film

- Directed by: Jihan El-Tahri
- Screenplay by: Jihan El Tahri Peter Chappell
- Produced by: Arte France Canal + Capa
- Cinematography: Peter Chappell
- Edited by: Véronique Leroy
- Release date: 2000
- Running time: 104 minutes
- Country: France

L'Afrique en morceaux is a 2000 documentary film directed by Jihan El-Tahri.

== Synopsis ==
April, 1994. Genocide in Rwanda. 800,000 dead. A catastrophe that upset the balance in the entire region. The Great Lakes region of Africa ended the year with a bloodbath. This documentary shows the intrigues, the dramatic effects, the treasons, the vengeances that prevailed over those years and whose only goal was to maintain or increase each faction's area of influence. In just ten years, the population saw all their hopes vanish: The dream of an Africa in control of its own destiny, alimentary self-sufficiency, the end of interethnic conflicts.
