= Keepers of Memory =

- Directed by: Eric Kabera
- Release date: 2004
- Country: Rwanda

Keepers of Memory is a 2004 documentary film directed by Rwandan filmmaker Eric Kabera. It documents the eyewitness accounts and traumatic aftermath of the 1994 Rwandan genocide.

== Synopsis ==
In the documentary, features accounts of victims and perpetrators of the genocide.

== Production ==
The title refers to the people who take care of Rwanda's sacred burial sites, which keep the memory of the genocide alive for future generations.

== Release and later screenings ==
Keepers of Memory was screened at the 2004 Toronto International Film Festival.

It was shown at the 5th Jewish Filmfestival Zagreb in Zagreb, Croatia, in 2011, and at the 2020 Fribourg International Film Festival in Fribourg, Switzerland.
