= Duhozanye =

- Directed by: Karoline Frogner
- Country of origin: Norway

Original release
- Release: 2011

Duhozanye: A Rwandan Village of Widows is a feature Norwegian documentary film for television from 2011 by director Karoline Frogner.

Norway's previous minister of justice, Knut Storberget, referred to Duhozanye in his latest book: "a film about a community of widows in Rwanda, an insightful and intense depiction of these widows."

== Summary ==
The Kinyarwanda word duhozanye means "let us console one another". Frogner's film documents the development of the Duhozanye Association founded by Daphrose Mukarutamu, a Tutsi who lost her husband and nine of her eleven children to the Rwandan genocide. The community was at first a group of neighbours who buried the dead and cared for twenty orphans, but grew to a network of some 4000 widows, both Hutus and Tutsis, who cared for each other and for the orphans of the genocide, running courses, starting businesses and participating in national reconciliation.

== Screenings ==
- Shown on Norwegian public broadcasting channel, NRK2, 24 May 2011
- Memorium Nürnberger Prozesse, Cineroom, Bärenschanzstr. 72, 90429 Nürnberg, 10 April 2014
- The House of Literature Oslo, April 2014
