= Karoline Frogner =

Norwegian filmmaker, photographer, writer and lecturer

- Born: 3 February 1961
- Occupation: Filmmaker, photographer, writer and lecturer
- Awards: Hans Christian Ostrøs minnepris (1998)

Anne Karoline Frogner (born February 3, 1961) is a Norwegian filmmaker, photographer, writer and lecturer. She is one of Norway's foremost documentary filmmakers and is a stills photographer for the image agency Samfoto. She is the director of production company Integritet Film AS and the author of several books.

Her films often cover human rights issues. In 1990 she started a children's art centre in Betlehem. She was made a Government scholar in the State budget of Norway of 2014.

== Films ==
- 2011: Gacacas and the Fairness in the Grass
- 2011: Duhozanye - We Who Comfort Each Other, about a widows society in Rwanda.
- 2009: Kirsten Flagstad Place, a documentary film about opera singer Kirsten Flagstad.
- 2003: Tradra - Yesterday I Became a Romani, a documentary about travellers in Norway.
- 1999: Stolen Time/Thirst, a short story project based on three short stories by Knut Hamsun.
- 1995: The Time Of Darkness - drama based on the lives of ten female members of the Norwegian Resistance during World War II who were arrested by the Nazis and deported to labour camps in Germany.
- 1994: Asil - Lisa Went to School - Or Vice Versa, a short film about a dyslexic girl.
- 1990: Whistling Not Allowed, a short film about Norwegian girls dating German soldiers during World War II.
- 1989: God Bless the Child, a short film about Palestinian children playing Intifada.
- 1988: A Portrait of Anja Breien.

== Awards ==
- 2013: Norwegian government grant.
- 2004: Amanda Award nomination for best documentary and the people's choice award, for Tradra.
- 1995: Amanda Award for best documentary, Times Of Darkness
- Times of Darkness: Best Documentary Award, Women's Film Festival, Turin
- Times of Darkness: Best Film, Nordic Glory of Jyvaskyla in Finland.
- The Osterø Award for humanitarian work, Military Deny Peace Prize 1995.
- Whistling Not Allowed: Nordic Film, Lübeck 1990.
- The Jewish community planted a tree bearing Frogner's name for Times Of Darkness - Women's Encounter with Nazism.

== Books ==
- 1997: Portrait of a Neighbour: A Portrait of Eight Immigrant Women
- 1995: Times Of Darkness - Women's Encounter with Nazism.
- 1994: Lisa Went to School - Or Vice Versa: children's book, along with Jón Sveinbjørn Jónsson, illustrated by Annie Goetzinger.
- 1992: A Suffering without Borders: the Face of Kurdish Refugees (along with Unn-Iren Aasdalen) Cappelen ISBN 82-02-13303-3.
- 1991: Intifada Children: A Meeting with Palestinian Women and Children

== Compilation DVD ==
- 2004: Times Of Darkness

Films included on this DVD: God Bless the Child, Whistling Not Allowed, Asil - Lisa Went to School - Or Vice Versa, Stolen Time and Time of Darkness - Women's Encounter with Nazism.

== Exhibitions ==
- 2014: The film Duhozanye. The Widows of Rwanda about the gacaca-trials during the aftermath of the genocide in Rwanda, was screened at the Memorium Nuremberg Trials from 10/4-12/5 as part of the exhibition, commemorating the 20th anniversary of the Rwandan genocide.
- 2011: Gacacas and the Fairness in the Grass, Norwegian Center for Studies of Holocaust and Religious Minorities - Bygdøy, Oslo.
- 2011: Dag og Karoline Frogner - Photo series from Rwanda, and Le Marais in Paris, Modum art union - Modum.
- 1998: Bertolt Brecht Multimedia performance with music, Hennie Onstad Art gallery, Bayern Prison, Bredtvedt Female Correctional Facilities.
- 1991: Intifada Children Current Art Gallery, Oslo.
