= Anne Aghion =

French-American documentary filmmaker

- Born: 1960 (age 65–66); Paris, France
- Occupations: Film director, film producer, screenwriter
- Years active: 1996–present
- Awards: Official Selection of the Cannes Film Festival; 2009 My Neighbor My Killer Best documentary Nominee Gotham Awards 2009 My Neighbor My Killer Best Documentary Montreal Black Film Festival 2010 My Neighbor My Killer Coral Award for Best Work of a Non-Latin American Director on a Latin America Subject; 1996 Se le movió el piso: A portrait of Managua
- Website: www.anneaghionfilms.com

Anne Aghion (born 1960) is a French-American documentary filmmaker. She is a Guggenheim Fellow, a Mac Dowell Colony Fellow and a Rockefeller Foundation Bellagio Center Fellow.

In 2005, she won an Emmy Award for her documentary In Rwanda We Say…The Family That Does Not Speak Dies. In 2009, her film My Neighbor My Killer was Official Selection of the Cannes Film Festival and a nominee for Best Documentary at the Gotham Awards.

Her new film Turbulence was completed in 2024.

== Filmmaking career ==
Aghion is best known for her documentary films on post-genocide Rwanda. Her feature film My Neighbor My Killer, an official selection at the Cannes Film Festival in 2009, poses the question of "How do you make it right again?" after the end of the genocide. This film as well as the three installments of the Gacaca trilogy are the result of nearly ten years of footage gathered in a small rural community in Rwanda.

In Aghion's first Rwanda film Gacaca, Living Together Again In Rwanda?, the first installment of the Gacaca series, a trilogy she made on the aftermath of the genocide in Rwanda, Anne Aghion closely examines the Gacaca courts, a citizen-based justice system that aims to try the crimes of the genocide. The proceedings would occur on grass – "Gacaca" in Kinyarwanda – where anyone who had a denouncement against the accused would be free to speak. If no one accused a prisoner, then that prisoner would be freed.

In Rwanda We Say…The Family That Does Not Speak Dies, the second film of the trilogy, chronicles the release of a suspect in his community and how victims and suspects slowly learn how to live together.

The third installment of her Rwanda series, The Notebooks of Memory, was released in 2009 and gives an account of the beginning of the Gacaca trials. It focuses on the local citizen-judges' examination of testimonies from both the survivors and those accused of the crimes. The Gacaca films have won numerous awards and gained international fame. They have also been widely used by non-profit organizations for educational and training purposes, and have been screened to officials, victims and prisoners in Rwanda.

On a grant of the National Science Foundation Antarctic artist and writer program, Aghion peregrinated to Antarctica, where she filmed the feature-length, Ice People. In Ice People, she filmed the lives of geologists and North Dakota State University professors Allan Ashworth and Adam Lewis and the McMurdo Station staff over four months. The scientists, accompanied by two undergraduate students, researched fossils of ancient specimens as they sought to uncover the climatic evolution of the world's coldest continent. The film premiered at the San Francisco International Film Festival in April 2008 and was shown at the Independence Night Film of the Film Society of Lincoln Center in 2008.

Her first film, Se Le Movió El Piso (The Earth Moved Under Him)—A Portrait of Managua, was shot in the skid row of Managua. The film gives viewers an inside look in the life of Nicaraguan slum dwellers as they recount the numerous obstacles they have had to overcome in their lives.

Aghion is a member of Film Fatales women's independent filmmaker collective.

== Newest film ==
In 2024, Aghion finished her 7th film, which has been 12 years in the making. The film, called Turbulence, tackles the following question : How do we overcome the heartbreaks, sorrow and traumas we endure or witness, and come out whole?

In her film career, Anne Aghion traveled the world and witnessed the lives of people who survived extreme circumstances. In Turbulence, she examines aspects of her own family history — losing her mother when she was a child, and her father’s memories of life during the Holocaust. The film uses a series of cinematic letters to her mother to explore these subjects.

The film, written, directed and produced by Anne Aghion, is made in association with Arte France - La Lucarne, and with the participation of the French Centre national du cinéma et de l’image animée, Procirep & Angoa, Jewish Story Partners, and New York State Council on the Arts.

== Biography and early career ==
Aghion lives in New York City and France.

Before becoming a filmmaker, Aghion held various posts at The New York Times Paris bureau and the International Herald Tribune. Prior to her debut as director and producer of her own films, she worked as a videographer, as well as production and post-production manager.

Aghion earned a Bachelor of Arts Magna Cum Laude in Arab Language and Literature from Barnard College at Columbia University in New York, and following her studies, lived in Cairo, Egypt, for two years.

== Awards ==
Aghion won an Emmy Award in 2005 for her documentary In Rwanda We Say…The Family That Does Not Speak Dies. My Neighbor My Killer was an Official Selection of the Cannes Film Festival in 2009, nominated for Best Documentary at the Gotham Awards. It was screened at the 2009 Human Rights Watch International Film Festival at the Lincoln Center for the Performing Arts in New York where Aghion received the Néstor Almendros Award (named for the Oscar-winning Néstor Almendros) for courage in filmmaking. It also was Best Documentary at the Montreal Black Festival. Aghion also won a UNESCO Fellini Prize for Gacaca, Living Together Again In Rwanda?

Ice People screened at the San Francisco Film Festival in 2008 and at the Independence Film Night of the Film Society of Lincoln Center.

In 1996, her first documentary Se le movió el piso: A portrait of Managua won the Coral Award for "Best Non-Latin American Documentary on Latin America" at the Havana Film Festival in Havana, Cuba.

Aghion is also a recipient of the Guggenheim Fellowship, the Mac Dowell Colony Fellowship and the Rockefeller foundation's Bellagio Center Fellowship. Aghion is also a public speaker and teacher and has been a jury for various festivals and events.

== Filmography ==
- Se le movió el piso: A portrait of Managua (1995)
- Gacaca, Living Together Again In Rwanda? (2002)
- In Rwanda We Say…The Family That Does Not Speak Dies (2004)
- Ice People (2008)
- The Notebooks of Memory (2009)
- My Neighbor, My Killer (2009)
- Turbulence (2024)
