= Ice People =

2008 film about Antarctic research

- Screenshot of Allan Ashworth and Adam Lewis looking for fossils in the McMurdo Dry Valleys
- Directed by: Anne Aghion
- Written by: Anne Aghion
- Produced by: Anne Aghion
- Starring: Allan Ashworth; Adam Lewis
- Edited by: Nadia Ben Rachid
- Distributed by: Dry Valleys Productions
- Release date: 2008
- Running time: 77 minutes
- Country: Antarctica
- Language: English

Ice People is a documentary film directed by Anne Aghion about the research of Allan Ashworth and Adam Lewis in Antarctica. Produced by Dry Valleys Productions, this 2008 film portrays the scientists discovering fossils from 13.9 million years ago. The film premiered at the San Francisco International Film Festival in April 2008 and was screened at the Jerusalem Film Festival in July 2008. This film aired on Sundance Channel in 2009.

== Synopsis ==
Ice People brings Anne Aghion and her crew to Antarctica where they spent four months following the lives of North Dakota State University geologist professors Allan Ashworth and Adam Lewis, as well as the McMurdo Station staff over four months. The film crew then followed the professors and two undergraduate students into the field where they camped out and shot in conditions of extreme cold and winds that ranged from -50 °C/-60 °F to 0 °C/32 °F. The film shows the scientific team scouring ancient emptied lakebeds in the hope of finding evidence of plants and insects that would prove that the world's coldest continent was once warm and verdant roughly 14 to 20 million years ago.
