= Africa United (2010 film) =

2010 film by Deborah Gardner-Paterson

- Cinema release poster
- Directed by: Deborah 'Debs' Gardner-Paterson
- Written by: Rhidian Brook
- Produced by: Mark Blaney; Jackie Sheppard; Eric Kabera
- Starring: Emmanuel Jal; Eriya Ndayambaje; Roger Nsengiyumva; Sanyu Joanita Kintu; Sherrie Silver; Yves Dusenge
- Cinematography: Sean Bobbitt
- Edited by: Victoria Boydell
- Music by: Bernie Gardner
- Production companies: Pathé; BBC Films; UK Film Council; Footprint Films; Link Media Productions; Out of Africa Entertainment
- Distributed by: Warner Bros. Pictures
- Release date: 22 October 2010
- Running time: 88 minutes
- Country: United Kingdom
- Language: English

Africa United is a 2010 British comedy-drama adventure film directed by first-time UK film director Deborah 'Debs' Gardner-Paterson and starring Emmanuel Jal, Eriya Ndayambaje, Roger Nsengiyumva, Sanyu Joanita Kintu, Sherrie Silver and Yves Dusenge. The plot is about a group of Rwandan children who travel 3000 miles across the African continent to get to the 2010 FIFA World Cup in South Africa.

== Synopsis ==
In Rwanda, football fanatic Dudu Kayenzi is teaching a group of children how to make an "organic football" using a UN condom, plastic bag and string. Meanwhile, his best friend Fabrice longs to pursue his ambition of becoming an association football legend and is seen breaking the local record for the most continuous football kick-ups. When Fabrice is offered the chance to audition for the opening ceremony of the 2010 Football World Cup in South Africa, he fabricates a plan to sneak past his strict, wealthy parents with Dudu and Dudu's sister Beatrice. Beatrice wishes to become a doctor and find a cure for AIDS. Fabrice tries to express his love of football to his mother, but she simply replies "Africa doesn't need dreams, it needs to wake up".

The following day Fabrice plucks up the courage to sneak out of home early and, with Dudu and Beatrice, masquerade as part of a woman's family in order to get on a bus to Kigali. However, they miss their stop whilst having to hide during a ticket inspection, ending up in the Democratic Republic of Congo.

The trio seek shelter in a refugee camp, upon which they meet Foreman George, an ex-child soldier, who offers them a chance to escape the camp which is plagued by militia during the night, who force any fit and healthy child to join the civil war. They flee in a jeep, but George's fellow soldiers catch up with them the following day. The group are just able to escape the car as the motor heats up and explodes. They seek shelter in an old carriage in the forest, where Fabrice discovers a bag full of cash George has stolen from his General, indicating why they were being pursued. However, a confrontation is jilted as they are set afoot again upon discovering a panther in the toilet.

Dudu, Beatrice, Fabrice and George arrive at the shore of Lake Tanganyika, where they buy a boat to get to Burundi on the other side. It is here when Dudu begins to narrate a fictional story of a kid and his sister who are commissioned by God to design a football that never busts (much like his makeshift ones). They will require rubber from a tree, plastic from "Shit Mountain" and string from a lake guarded by a fierce fish.

Fabrice's mother texts and calls him on his mobile phone, but he throws the phone into the lake. Eventually they arrive at a posh beach resort, where Celeste, a sex slave, is working for the white owner by selling beverages. She catches the four children and insists they go back, but George flashes his bag of money for bribery and so the owner lets them stay and play in the pool and be waited on. Fabrice has time to play with Dudu's "organic footballs". As George falls asleep, the owner steals his bag of money and throws them out of the villa; however, they soon retrieve the bag and the money and Celeste joins them.

Using Dudu's tactical skills, they find various and bizarre methods of pursuing their journey to South Africa, including an ox-drawn cart. Celeste reveals she ran away from her tribal village to avoid an arranged marriage, and Fabrice sees George throw away his gun, which he used to shoot his fellow soldiers earlier on.

The team runs out of money, so Dudu insists they can earn some by giving blood at a local medical center. Everyone passes the blood test except for Dudu, who already knows he is HIV-positive, although he does not reveal this to the others. After crossing the border into Zimbabwe, Dudu exchanges the Zambian kwacha for Zimbabwean dollars, but Celeste explains the currency is defunct and that he has been scammed. He tries to collect the money after it gets thrown into the water by an angry Fabrice, and he is helpless as it spills over the Victoria Falls.

During the night, in which the gang sleep outside a wildlife reserve and Dudu and Fabrice compare footballers to animals, Dudu develops TB and in the morning he is rushed to a local mission hospital. There is a school attached to the hospital, and a school teacher (Leleti Khumalo) notices Beatrice's intelligence and offers her a place at the school to study for free. The doctor soon explains that, although the medical team have been able to stabilise Dudu's tuberculosis, he has a low CD4 T-cell count (i.e. he is HIV-positive) and needs medication that won't be available for another three days. However, Dudu decides to persevere on the journey and to continues with Fabrice, George and Celeste towards the stadium: Beatrice decides to stay behind at the school to have an education and so try to fulfill her dream of becoming a doctor and maybe find a cure for AIDS for Dudu's sake.

The team arrive at the border with South Africa, where an official insists that they are refugees. The security guards take Dudu's ball but again the team works together to retrieve it. Fabrice's football skills impress the guards, who then agree to rush the children to Soccer City in Johannesburg for the Cup. Dudu falls ill again and is rushed to the medical facility at the stadium, where he completes his fictional story by saying Fabrice carries the ball 'God gave to the people of Africa'. Except for Dudu, the team carry the ball off into the now roaring crowd.

At the end, Dudu is seen walking off into a light at the end of the Soccer city stadium tunnel, carrying his briefcase & custom-made ball suggesting that he has died of HIV–AIDS. The song in the end credits is a rendition of Bob Marley's One Love/People Get Ready.

== Reception ==
On the review aggregator website Rotten Tomatoes, 89% of 18 critics' reviews are positive, with an average rating of 5.8/10.

The Times described the film as a "small budget film with a big heart". "When did you last watch a kids' film about Africa that left you laughing, punching the air and weeping discreetly into your popcorn?" asked Kate Muir, giving the film 4 stars. The Financial Times and Metro gave it 4 stars, with the former describing it as a "terrific road movie" and the latter, "the feelgood film of the year". The Daily Express also described it as "the feelgood film of the year" noting that, "there is something infectious about the optimism".

The Guardian, Time Out and Empire Online all gave the film three stars out of five. The Guardian's Xan Brooks found it "irksome and endearing by turns", while Dave Calhoun in Time Out thought it was "well-meaning but scrappy" and likened it to "an inferior, kiddie spin on the exotic high jinks and low lives of Slumdog Millionaire".
