= Floriane Kaneza =

Burundian film producer

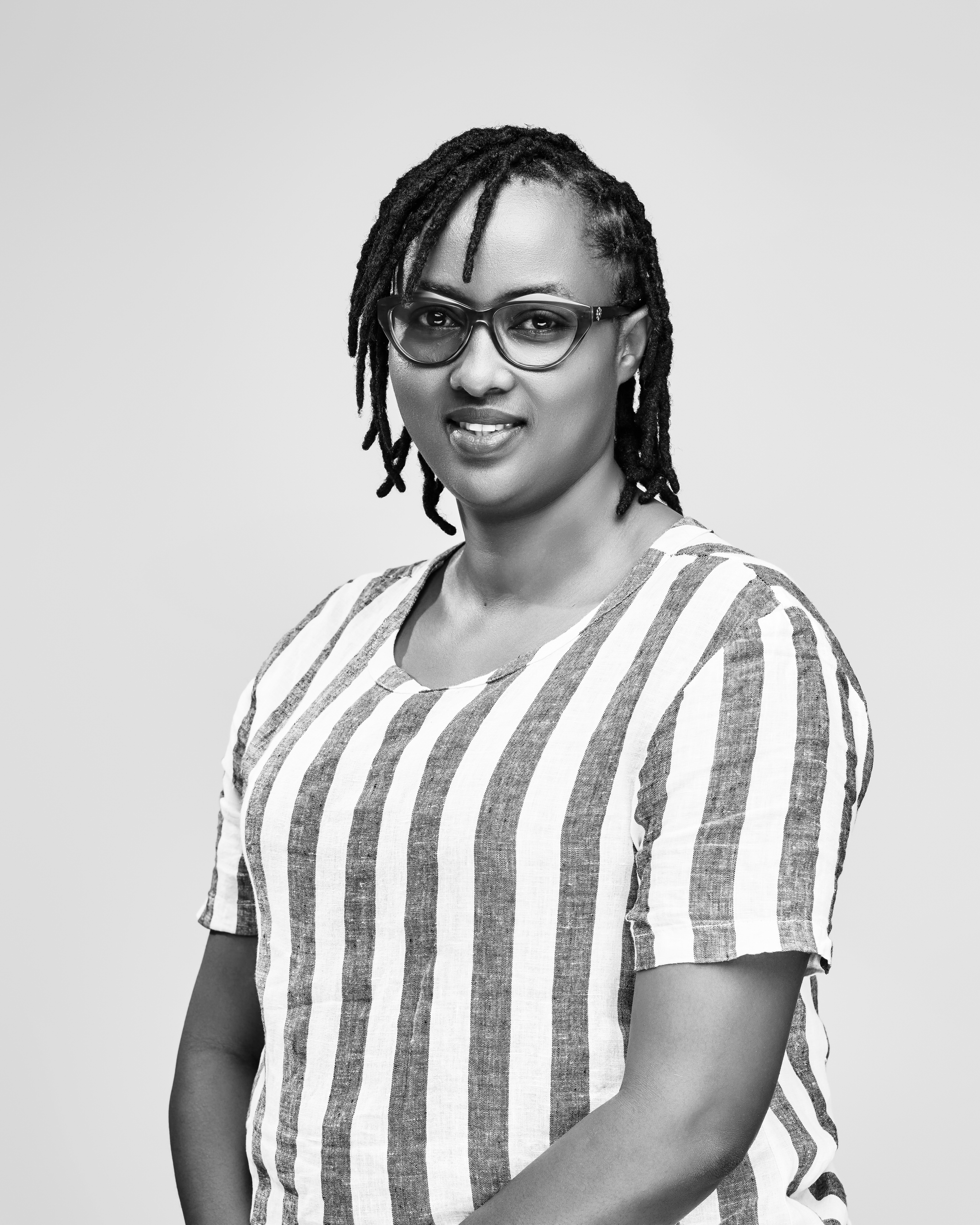
- Born: March 12, 1987 (age 39); Bujumbura, Burundi
- Occupations: Film Producer and Director; Cultural Entrepreneur

Floriane Kaneza (born March 12, 1987) is a Burundian filmmaker, screenwriter, and producer based in Sydney, Australia. In addition to her filmmaking, she is known for her role as director of two leading Rwandan film festivals, the Mashariki African Film Festival and the Urusaro International Women Film Festival, during the 2010s.

== Early life and education ==
Kaneza was born in Bujumbura, Burundi, on March 12, 1987.

She studied communications at Hope Africa University in Burundi.

== Career ==
Kaneza started her Film and Television career as an actress in 2009 with the Kamenge Youth Center's theatrical troupe in Bujumbura. She next starred in the television drama series UMUCO (2011–2012) which was broadcast on Burundi National Radio and Television.

In 2012 she joined Itulive Media and Communications, a production studio, where she ventured into film from behind the camera. Under the Itulive banner she wrote and directed Sana (2013), her first short. The film garnered its lead actress a Best Actress award at the International Festival of Cinema and Audiovisual of Burundi (FESTICAB) that same year. Other Itulive projects she worked on in various capacities, ranging from producer to casting director, include Joseph Ndayisenga's award-winning films Welcome Home (2013) and IMashoka (2014)

In 2015 Kaneza migrated to Rwanda, and in 2016 took on the role of artistic director of the Mashariki African Film Festival (MAAF), which she led until 2018.

In 2018, Kaneza was appointed director of the Urusaro International Women Film Festival (Urusaro IWFF), a project of Cine Femmes Rwanda dedicated to championing women working in Africa film. She held the position for 4 years, and in 2021 was recognized by The East African newspaper as one of the six most influential women in Rwanda's creative sector.

In 2021, Kaneza founded Amatuta Productions to support emerging filmmakers. Under the Amatuta banner, she wrote and directed Perdue (2023) which won the Act for Equality prize (le Prix Agir) at the 40th edition of the Vues D’Afrique film festival in 2024. The short film, about a 16-year-old girl forced by her parents to marry the professor who impregnated her, went on to screen at other international film festivals, including the 2024 Silicon Valley African Film Festival. In 2024 she produced Before Sixteen, the directorial debut of Burundian filmmaker Loïc Niyonkuru. In 2025 the documentary short film screened at FESPACO, the Durban Film Festival, Doclisboa, and Stlouis'Docs (Senegal), and was one of two African films shortlisted for the Sony Future Filmmaker Awards.

In addition to leading Amatuta Productions, Kaneza served as director of distribution and partnerships at Zacu Entertainment, a Rwandan production and distribution company acquired by Canal+ in 2022.

=== Distinctions ===
Kaneza has served on several film festival juries. These include:

- International Festival of Cinema and Audiovisual of Burundi (2014)
- Arusha African Film Festival (2014)
- Mashariki African Film Festival (2015)
- Zanzibar International Film Festival (2021)
- Festival du Film Court Francophone - [Un Poing C'est Court] (2022)
- I am Tomorrow International Film Festival (2024

In 2024 Kaneza was selected by the Organisation Internationale de la Francophonie (OIF) to serve as a member on the Documentary and Film Series Commission of the Fonds Image de la Francophonie, an OIF initiative to support and promote the creation of audiovisual works from filmmakers in Francophone countries.

== Filmography ==
Year	Title	Role	Genre	Ref
2011-12	UMUCO	Actress	TV drama series	
2013	Sana	Scriptwriter/Director	Short fiction film	
2013	Welcome Home	Line Producer	Short fiction film	
2014	I Mashoka	Casting Director	Feature fiction film	
2014	Ashley	Casting Director	Short fiction film	
2014	Kiswahili	Director	Short documentary	
2015	Croco in the Museum (Croco au Musée)	Director	Short documentary	
2018	Why Not Me?	Casting Director	Short fiction film	
2022	Muzungu	Producer	Feature documentary	
2022	The Whistle (Le Siflet)	Producer	Short documentary	
2023	Lost (Perdue)	Director/Producer	Short documentary	
2024	Before 16 (Avant 16 ans)	Producer	Short documentary	
2024	The Incubation	Production Supervisor	Feature fiction film	
2024	Weaving Bonds	Production Supervisor	Short fiction film	

== External link ==
- Floriane Kaneza at IMDb
