= Grey Matter (film) =

2011 Rwandan film

- Screenplay by: Kivu Ruhorahoza
- Produced by: Scarab Studio, POV Productions
- Starring: Ruth Shanel Nirere, Shami Bizimana, Hervé Kimenyi, Jean Paul Uwayezu, Natacha Muziramakenga, Kennedy Mazimpaka
- Edited by: Antonio Rui Ribeiro
- Distributed by: Scarab Studio Films
- Release date: 2011
- Running time: 100 minutes
- Countries: Rwanda; Australia

Grey Matter is a 2011 Rwandan film directed by Kivu Ruhorahoza.

== Synopsis ==
The film tells three stories which are separate and at times connected. In the first one, the young filmmaker Balthazar is looking for money in Kigali to produce his debut film, Le cycle du cafard, but the government refuses to finance a film based on the aftermath of the genocide in Rwanda. In the second, Balthazar's film takes shape and portrays a man, locked up in an asylum, who was an assassin during the war. In the third story, Yvan and Justine, brother and sister, are two young survivors who are trying to rebuild their lives.

== Awards ==
- Tribeca Film Festival 2011
- Warsaw Film Festival 2011
