= Jihan El-Tahri =

French screenwriter and director

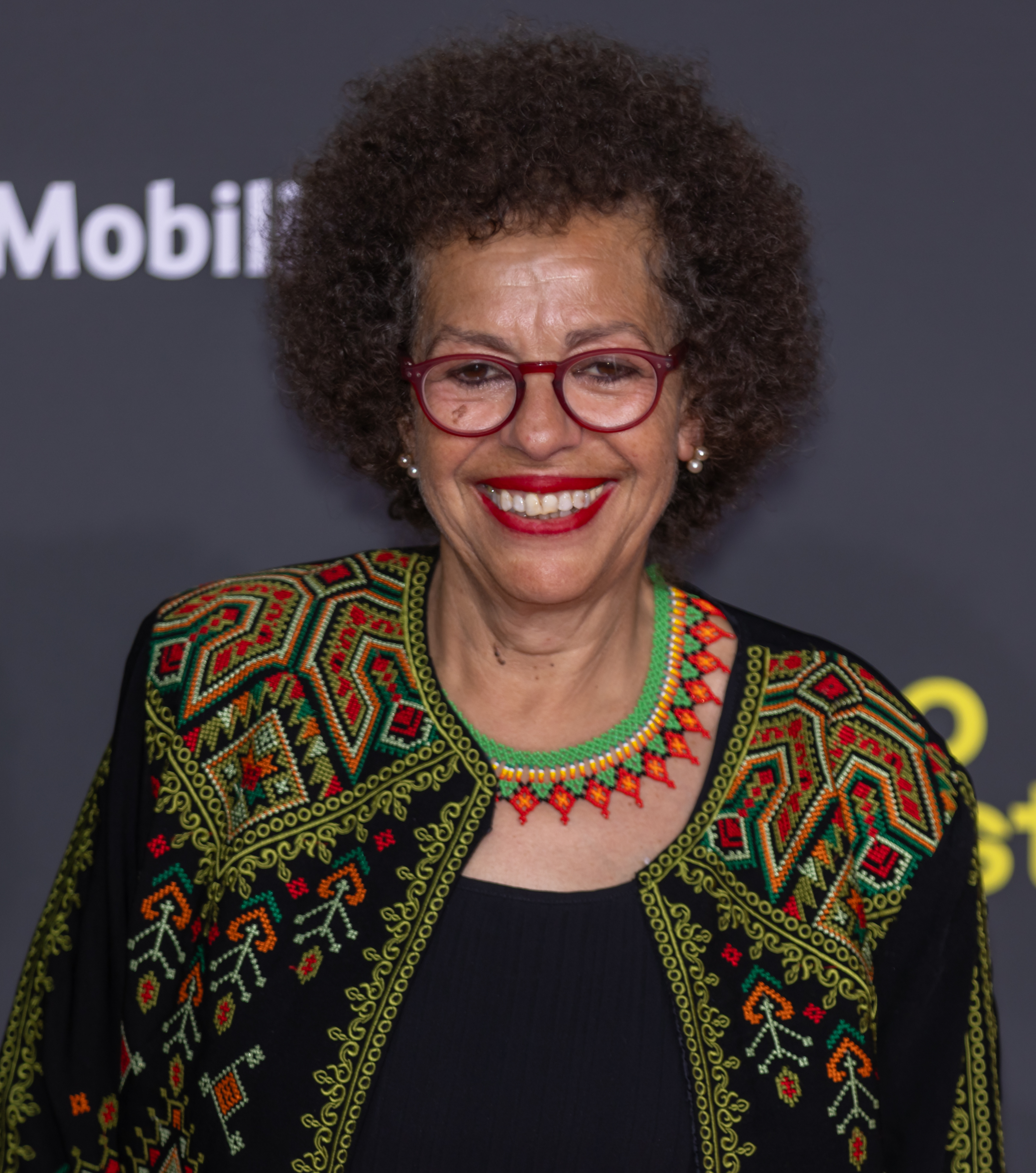
- El-Tahri in 2025
- Born: 1963 (age 62–63); Beirut
- Citizenship: French, Egyptian
- Education: American University in Cairo
- Occupations: screenwriter, director, author
- Employer(s): BBC, Reuters

Jihan El-Tahri (Arabic: ﺟﻬﺎﻥ ﺍلطاهري; born in Beirut, Lebanon) is a writer, director and producer of documentary films. She holds dual French and Egyptian nationalities.

In 1984, she received her BA in political science, and in 1986 her MA in political science from the American University in Cairo. She worked as a news correspondent with U.S. News & World Report and Reuters, TV researcher, and associate producer in Tunisia, Lebanon, Iraq, Jordan, Algeria, and Egypt between 1984 and 1990. As a correspondent, El-Tahri covered politics in the Middle East.

In 1990, El-Tahri started directing and producing documentaries for French television, and for the BBC since 1995. In 1992 she filmed Osama bin Laden's training camps in Sudan. She also provided professional support on four of the Steps for the Future films in 2001. The documentary, The House of Saud, appeared on the BBC in 2004 and on PBS in 2005. Her most recent documentary, 'Behind the Rainbow', was screened during the 53rd BFI London Film Festival in 2009.

She also worked with Ahron Bregman, an Israeli historian, on The Fifty Years War: Israel and the Arabs in 1998.

== Documentary Films ==
- The Koran and the Kalashnikov (2000)
- L'Afrique en morceaux (2000)
- The Price of Aid/Les maux de la faim (2003)
- The House of Saud (2004)
- Cuba, an African Odyssey (2007)
- Behind the Rainbow (2009)
- Egypt's Modern Pharaohs (2015)

== Books ==
- Les Sept Vies de Yasser Arafat (with Christophe Boltanski), Paris, 1997

== Recognition and awards ==
In 2025, El-Tahri was appointed as a member of the jury at the 78th Locarno Film Festival for Pardi di Domani - Short Film Competition.
