= Umurage =

- Directed by: Gorka Gamarra
- Screenplay by: Gorka Gamarra, Sonia Rolley, Jean-Marie Mbarushimana, Puri Ramírez
- Produced by: Icarukuri
- Edited by: Nacho Ruiz Capillas, Carolina Martínez Urbina
- Music by: Jean Paul Samputu, Adrián Begoña
- Release date: 2002
- Running time: 52 minutes
- Country: Spain

Umurage is a Spanish 2002 documentary film directed by Gorka Gamarra about the Rwandan genocide.

== Synopsis ==
In Rwanda, a hundred members of the Ukuri Kuganze Association, made up in its majority by survivors of the genocide, and a few of their executioners, freed after having confessed and asked for forgiveness in 2003, meet at a reinsertion center. These executioners are going home, in most cases to the same places where they carried out their crimes, and will have to "face" their victims and ask their forgiveness. In 1994, over a space of just one hundred days, almost a million people were murdered.
