= Urusaro International Women Film Festival =

Rwandan women's film festival

The Urusaro International Women Film Festival (sometimes shortened to the Urusaro Festival) is a Rwandan women's film festival.

Held in Kigali, Rwanda and organized by CinéFEMMES Rwanda, it is intended to bring together and empower women filmmakers.

The festival was founded by Jacqueline Murekeyisoni, founder and CEO of Cine Femmes Rwanda. Floriane Kaneza was its director from 2019-2021.

== Awards ==
As of 2024, the Urusaro Festival gave awards to best films in the following categories:

- National Short Fiction
- National Documentary
- East African Short Fiction
- East African Documentary
- African Short Fiction
- African Documentary
- African Feature Fiction.
