= In Rwanda We Say...The Family That Does Not Speak Dies =

In Rwanda We Say…The Family That Does Not Speak Dies
- Screenshot depicting two Rwandans
- Directed by: Anne Aghion
- Produced by: Laurent Bocahut; Anne Aghion
- Edited by: Nadia Ben Rachid
- Distributed by: Gacaca Productions and Incarus Films
- Release date: 2004
- Running time: 54 minutes
- Country: Rwanda
- Language: Kinyarwanda with English subtitles

In Rwanda We Say…The Family That Does Not Speak Dies is a documentary film examining the Gacaca court justice process in the aftermath of the Rwandan genocide in 1994. Directed by Anne Aghion and produced by Gacaca Productions, this 2004 film won an Emmy Award for "Outstanding Informational Programming." Filmed in Rwanda, the language of In Rwanda is Kinyarwanda with English subtitles.

== Synopsis ==
Set in Rwanda, Anne Aghion interviews a genocide perpetrator who has been released back into his community, and victims of the genocide. The film follows how at first, the coexistence between the people who instigated the genocide and the victimized people is unbearable. Many of the victims feel rage toward their former oppressors, but gradually, the victims and oppressors start talking to the camera, and then to each other as they start the difficult task of living with each other. The documentary portrays how the people's spirits cannot be crushed by the Rwandan genocide, the 1994 mass killing of hundreds of thousands of Rwanda's minority Tutsi and some moderates of its Hutu majority by the Interahamwe and the Impuzamugambi.

The other two films in the trilogy are Gacaca, Living Together Again In Rwanda? (2002), and "The Notebooks of Memory" (2009).
