= 100 Days (2001 film) =

2001 film by Nick Hughes

- Directed by: Nick Hughes
- Written by: Nick Hughes
- Produced by: Nick Hughes; Eric Kabera
- Cinematography: Nick Hughes
- Edited by: Kavila Matu
- Music by: Cécile Kayirebwa; Steve Parr; Sharon Rose
- Release dates: 1 February 2001 (US); 13 September 2001 (TIFF)
- Running time: 100 minutes
- Countries: United Kingdom, Rwanda
- Language: English

100 Days is a 2001 British-Rwandan drama film directed by Nick Hughes and produced by Hughes and Rwanda filmmaker Eric Kabera. It is about the 1994 genocide in Rwanda.

== Synopsis ==
The film is a dramatisation of events that happened during the 1994 genocide against Tutsi people in Rwanda. It focuses on the life of a young, refugee Tutsi girl, Josette, and her attempts to find safety while the genocide is taking place. She enters a church that is purportedly a sanctuary protected by UN forces, but the church's Hutu priest agrees to spare her life only in exchange for being raped.

== Cast ==
- Eric Bridges Twahirwa
- Cleophas Kabasita
- Davis Kagenza
- Mazimpaka Kennedy
- Davis Kwizera
- David Mulwa
- Didier Ndengeyintwali
- Denis Nsanzamahoro
- Justin Rusandazangabo

== Production ==
The film was the first feature film made about the 1994 Rwandan genocide. It employed no professional actors; rather the filmmakers used actual Tutsi and Hutu survivors to act out the script, and was shot on location at the actual scenes where acts of genocide occurred.

The title of the film is a direct reference to the length of time that passed from the beginning of the genocide on 6 April until it ended in mid-July 1994.

== Release ==
The film was released in 2001, four years after filming.
