= Iseta: Behind the Roadblock =

Documentary on the Rwandan genocide

Iseta: Behind the Roadblock is a documentary based on the Rwandan genocide released in 2008. It is the only film that contains documented segments of footage of actual killing during the Rwandan genocide.

It was co-produced by British-Kenyan producer, Nick Hughes and Rwandan producer, Eric Kabera. It was directed by Juan Reina.

== Synopsis ==
The documentary follows Nick Hughes, a British cameraman who returns to where he photographed some of the atrocities of the Rwandan genocide to show the images to the victims. Some members of the community where able to help friends and family come together to work with Hughes to identify the victims and the killers.
