= Eric Kabera =

Rwandan filmmaker

- Born: 1970 (age 55–56); Zaire (DRC)
- Occupation: Filmmaker
- Known for: 100 Days (2001), founder of Rwanda Cinema Centre and Kwetu Film Institute
- Height: 1997–present

Eric Kabera (born in 1970) is a Rwandan filmmaker. He is known for his 2001 film about the 1994 Rwandan genocide, called 100 Days, and as the founder of Rwanda Cinema Centre (RCC) in 2001, which ran the Rwanda Film Festival from 2005 to 2019. In 2011 he founded a film school in Kigali, the Kwetu Film Institute (KFI).

== Early life and education ==
Eric Kabera, a Rwandan man, was born in Zaire, now the Democratic Republic of the Congo (DRC).

He studied psychology, pedagogy, and law.

== Career ==
=== Journalism ===
Kabera worked with journalists Fergal Keane and George Alagiah at the BBC in the late 1990s.

=== Filmmaking ===
While living in the DRC, the Rwandan genocide against the Tutsi started in April 1994, and 32 of his family members living in Rwanda at the time died in the violence. This led him to found a film production company, Link Media Productions, and to start making films.

In 1997 he directed and produced his first film, Changing Times in Challenging Times.

In 2001 he made a feature film about the genocide, titled 100 Days, directed by British director Nick Hughes. This was the first film shot in Rwanda after the genocide, as well as being the first feature film about the genocide. No professional actors were used, instead just both Tutsi and Hutu survivors of the genocide, and it was shot on location at the actual scenes where acts of genocide occurred.

Kabera has also made many documentary and short films focused on the Great Lakes region and Rwanda. In 2004, Kabera directed and produced a documentary titled Keepers of Memory, in which he interviewed both victims and perpetrators of the atrocities, on the 10th anniversary of the genocide. In the same year, he co-produced, in collaboration with the Rwanda Cinema Centre, Through my Eyes, a documentary showing Rwandan youth reflecting on their past, present, and future.

In 2005, he directed and produced Rowing into the Sunrise, a documentary highlighting Rwandan achievements in development made with the support of the United Nations Development Programme.

In 2007, he said he was keen on making a comedy film, but it was difficult to get a comedy set in Rwanda made.

He co-produced the British comedy-drama film Africa United, released in 2010 to good reviews.

== Rwanda Cinema Centre and Film Festival ==
In 2001 or 2002, Kabera founded the Rwanda Cinema Centre (RCC), aiming to train filmmakers and assist with the production of films in Rwanda. His intention was to give a voice to young Rwandans to tell their own stories, as before then, outsiders such as Belgians, French, Canadians, and Americans had been telling the stories of Rwanda. The RCC initiated various programs, such as the "Films on Youth by Youth" program, and an outreach program that screens locally made films to young people living in rural areas. It also developed a filmmaking skills training unit, growing to become one of the leading filmmaking centres in East and Central Africa. It has offered various certificate and diploma programs, and intended to offer degree courses with affiliates.

From 2005, the centre became known for organising the annual Rwanda Film Festival. The Rwanda Film Festival was a travelling festival, held not only in the capital of Kigali but the films, especially ones made by Rwandan filmmakers, were also shown on large inflatable screens in rural areas throughout the country. The festival later moved away from focusing only on the issue of the genocide and started screening films and workshops focused on other social issues of modern Rwanda. Kabera said in 2007 that he would like to make a comedy. The 15th edition was the last, taking place in October 2019.

== East African Filmmakers Forum ==
Kabera is a founder member of the East African Filmmakers Forum, covering Tanzania, Uganda, Kenya, and Rwanda, established in 2003. The forum met mainly at festivals, but owing to the lack of funding, filmmakers were unable to implement the resolutions agreed upon. In 2007, during the 4th East African Film Congress at Amakula Kampala International Film Festival, the forum resolved to form a union. In November 2008, the EAFF formed a union for filmmakers from Kenya, Uganda, Tanzania, Rwanda, Burundi, Sudan, Ethiopia, Eritrea, and Somalia, headed by Patrick Kihara from Kenya. Its aim was "to represent market/economic, legal and regulatory interests which film producers in the region have in common".

== Other activities ==
Kabera was responsible for initiating the building of the country's first purpose-built, multiplex, two-screen cinema in 2007, in the "2020 estate", on a hill overlooking Kigali city centre. However, construction was stalled in 2012 for lack of financing.

Kabera is also a member of the board of Advisors of Indian-American filmmaker Mira Nair's initiative Maisha Film Lab in Uganda, along with Spike Lee, Raoul Peck, and Sofia Coppola, among others.

Kabera also founded the Kwetu Film Institute (KFI) (also known as the Rwanda Film Institute) in Kigali in 2011, a training institute for all aspects of filmmaking and the performing arts. The institute offers a two-year diploma program in film and digital media studies.

He was a Phase 1 Project Partner of the four-year international, multi-disciplinary "Changing the Story" project, that ran from October 2018 to September 2022. Based at the University of Leeds and funded by the Arts and Humanities Research Council's Global Challenges Research Fund, the project focused on 12 countries from the OECD list of "fragile states" that had experienced extreme violence in their past. The project looked at various reconciliation measures, and aimed to use "arts and humanities research for practical international development projects with a lasting legacy".

== Recognition and awards ==
Kabera has attended many international film festivals where his films have been selected for screening, and garnered acclaim.

The Directors Guild of America selected him as one of 15 African filmmakers to discuss the new perspective of African cinema, an initiative facilitated by American actor Danny Glover and Louverture Films.

Kabera has been credited with kickstarting the Rwandan film industry, including coining the term "Hillywood".

== Selected filmography ==
Year	Film	Credit
2001	100 Days	Producer
2004	Keepers of Memory	Screenwriter, director, producer
2008	Iseta: Behind the Roadblock	Co-producer
2009	Alphonse's Bike	Producer, director, writer
2010	Africa United	Producer
2014	Intore	Producer, director, co-writer
2018–2019	Karani Ngufu	Executive producer
