= Lee Isaac Chung =

American film director and screenwriter (born 1978)

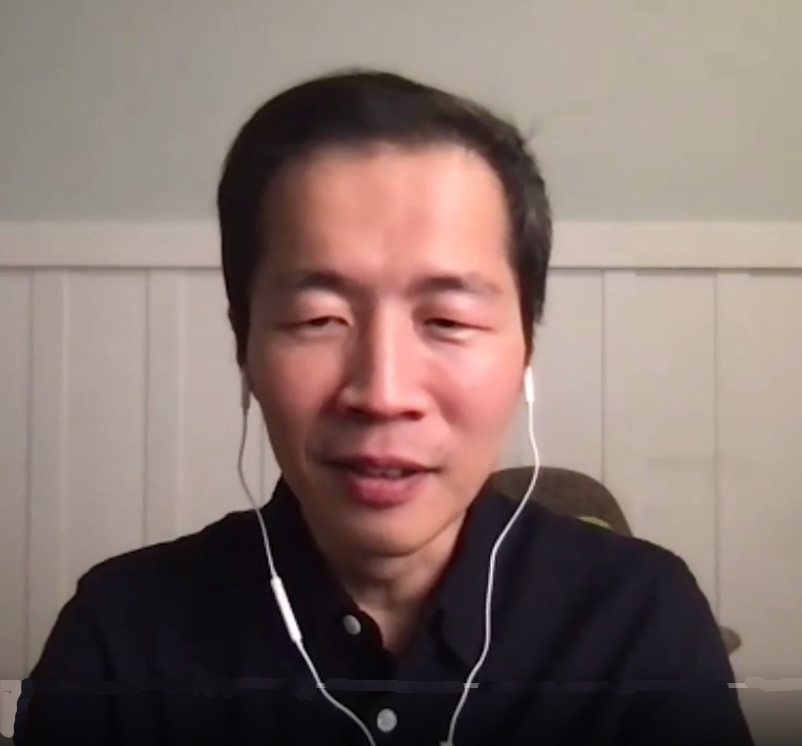
- Chung in a VOA interview from 2021
- Born: October 19, 1978 (age 47); Denver, Colorado, U.S.
- Education: Yale University (BA); University of Utah (MFA)
- Occupations: Film director; screenwriter; producer
- Years active: 2007–present
- Spouse: Valerie Chu
- Children: 1

Korean name
- Hangul: 정이삭
- RR: Jeong Isak
- MR: Chŏng Isak
- Website: leeisaacchung.com/

Lee Isaac Chung (born October 19, 1978) is an American filmmaker. His debut feature Munyurangabo (2007) was an official selection at the 2007 Cannes Film Festival and the first narrative feature film in the Kinyarwanda language.

Chung gained fame for directing the semi-autobiographical film Minari (2020), for which he received numerous major awards and nominations, including the Golden Globe Award for Best Foreign Language Film and nominations for Best Director and Best Original Screenplay at the 93rd Academy Awards. In 2023, he directed an episode in the third season of the Star Wars series The Mandalorian, and in 2024, he directed the disaster film Twisters.

== Early life and education ==
Chung was born on October 19, 1978, in Denver, to a family from South Korea. His family lived briefly in Atlanta before moving to a small farm in rural Lincoln, Arkansas. He attended Lincoln High School.

He is an alumnus of the U.S. Senate Youth Program. He attended Yale University to study biology. At Yale, with exposure to world cinema in his senior year, he dropped his plans for medical school to pursue film-making. He later pursued graduate studies in film-making at the University of Utah.

== Career ==
Chung's directorial debut was Munyurangabo, a movie set in Rwanda, a collaboration with students at an international relief base in Kigali. It tells an intimate story about the friendship between two boys in the aftermath of the Rwandan genocide. Chung had accompanied his wife, an art therapist, to Rwanda in 2006 when she volunteered to work with those affected by the 1994 genocide. He taught a film-making class at a relief base in Kigali. The movie was an opportunity to present the contemporary reality of Rwanda and to provide his students with practical film training. After he developed a nine-page outline with co-writer Samuel Gray Anderson, Chung shot the film over 11 days, working with a team of nonprofessional actors Chung found through local orphanages and with his students as crew members.

Munyurangabo premiered at the 2007 Cannes Film Festival as an Official Selection and played as an official selection at top film festivals worldwide, including the Busan International Film Festival, the Toronto International Film Festival, the Berlin International Film Festival, the Rotterdam International Film Festival, Roger Ebert's Ebertfest, and AFI Fest in Hollywood, where it won the festival's Grand Prize. It was an official selection of the New Directors/New Films Festival at New York's Lincoln Center and the Museum of Modern Art. The film received critical acclaim, and Chung was nominated at the Independent Spirit Awards ("Someone to Watch," 2008) and the Gotham Awards.

Chung's second film, Lucky Life (2010), was developed with the support of Kodak Film and the Cinéfondation at the Cannes Film Festival. Inspired by the poetry of Gerald Stern, the film premiered at the 2010 Tribeca Film Festival in New York City and was screened at festivals worldwide.

In 2012 Chung was named a United States Artists (USA) Fellow.

Chung's third film, Abigail Harm (2012), is based on the Korean folktale "The Woodcutter and the Nymph". It stars Amanda Plummer, Will Patton, and Burt Young and was produced by Eugene Suen and Samuel Gray Anderson. Shot on location in New York City, the film was an official selection at the Busan International Film Festival, Torino Film Festival, San Diego Asian Film Festival, CAAMFest, and winner of the Grand Prize and Best Director at Los Angeles Asian Pacific Film Festival.

In addition to film-making, Chung mentors young Rwandan film-makers through Almond Tree Rwanda, the Rwandan outpost for his U.S.-based production company, Almond Tree Films. Almond Tree Rwanda has produced several highly regarded shorts that have traveled to international festivals. Chung co-directed the 2015 Rwandan documentary I Have Seen My Last Born with Anderson. Produced by Chung, Anderson, John Kwezi, and Eugene Suen, the film focuses on the family relations and history of a genocide survivor in modern-day Rwanda.

He wrote and directed the semiautobiographical film Minari (2020), which was released to critical acclaim. Chung wrote the film in the summer of 2018, by which time he was considering retiring from film-making and accepted a teaching job at the University of Utah's Asia Campus in Incheon. Recalling this period, he said "I figured I might have just one shot at making another film ... I needed to make it very personal and throw in everything I was feeling."

In 2020, it was initially announced that Chung would direct and rewrite the live-action adaptation of the anime film Your Name, replacing Marc Webb as director. In July 2021, Chung departed the project, citing scheduling issues. Also in 2020, it was announced he was developing a romance film set in New York and Hong Kong, produced by Plan B and MGM.

In March 2023, he directed an episode of the third season of the Disney+ series, The Mandalorian. In July 2024, Chung directed Twisters, a sequel to the 1996 film Twister.

In January 2025, it was reported that Chung would direct the science-fiction film The Traveler for Skydance.

In July 2025, Chung entered negotiations to direct a prequel film based on the Ocean's franchise starring Margot Robbie. Chung exited the film in March 2026 due to creative differences.

== Personal life ==
Chung is married to Valerie Chu, whom he met while they were students at Yale. They have a daughter.

== Filmography ==
Film

Year	Title	Director	Writer	Producer	Notes
2007	Munyurangabo	Yes	Yes	Yes	Also editor and cinematographer
2010	Lucky Life	Yes	Yes	Yes	Also editor
2012	Abigail Harm	Yes	Yes	Uncredited	Also editor and cinematographer
2020	Minari	Yes	Yes	No	
2024	Twisters	Yes	No	No	Also executive soundtrack producer

Documentary

- I Have Seen My Last Born (2015)

Television

Year	Title	Episode
2023	The Mandalorian	"Chapter 19: The Convert"
2025	Star Wars: Skeleton Crew	"We're Gonna Be in So Much Trouble"

Actor

Year	Title	Role
2026	The Mandalorian and Grogu	Dok Suri

== Awards and nominations ==
Year	Award	Category	Title	Result	Ref.
2007	AFI Fest	Grand Jury Prize	Munyurangabo	Won	
2007	Amiens International Film Festival	SIGNIS Award	Munyurangabo	Won	
2007	Cannes Film Festival	Un Certain Regard	Munyurangabo	Nominated	
2007	Cannes Film Festival	Caméra d'Or	Munyurangabo	Nominated	
2007	Gotham Awards	Breakthrough Director	Munyurangabo	Nominated	
2008	FICCO	Best First Film	Munyurangabo	Won	
2008	Independent Spirit Awards	Someone to Watch Award	Munyurangabo	Nominated	
2008	Sarasota Film Festival	Narrative Feature Film	Munyurangabo	Won	
2010	Bratislava International Film Festival	Grand Prix	Lucky Life	Nominated	
2010	Tribeca Film Festival	Best Narrative Feature	Lucky Life	Nominated	
2013	CAAMFest	Best Narrative	Abigail Harm	Nominated	
2013	Los Angeles Asian Pacific Film Festival	Best Director - Narrative Feature	Abigail Harm	Won	
2013	Los Angeles Asian Pacific Film Festival	Best Narrative Feature	Abigail Harm	Won	
2015	Los Angeles Asian Pacific Film Festival	Best Documentary Feature	I Have Seen My Last Born	Nominated	
2020	Chicago Film Critics Association	Milos Stehlik Award for Promising Filmmaker	Minari	Nominated	
2020	Deauville Film Festival	Grand Special Prize	Minari	Nominated	
2020	Florida Film Critics Circle	Best Director	Minari	Nominated	
2020	Florida Film Critics Circle	Best Screenplay	Minari	Won	
2020	North Carolina Film Critics Association	Best Original Screenplay	Minari	Won	
2020	Sundance Film Festival	U.S. Dramatic Competition Grand Jury Prize	Minari	Won	
2020	Sundance Film Festival	U.S. Dramatic Competition Audience Award	Minari	Won	
2021	Golden Globe Awards	Best Foreign Language Film	Minari	Won	
2021	National Board of Review	Best Original Screenplay	Minari	Won	
2021	Independent Spirit Awards	Best Feature	Minari	Nominated	
2021	Independent Spirit Awards	Best Director	Minari	Nominated	
2021	Independent Spirit Awards	Best Screenplay	Minari	Nominated	
2021	San Diego Film Critics Society Awards	Best Original Screenplay	Minari	Won	
2021	Toronto Film Critics Association Awards	Best Film	Minari	Nominated	
2021	Toronto Film Critics Association Awards	Best Director	Minari	Nominated	
2021	Toronto Film Critics Association Awards	Best Screenplay	Minari	Won	
2021	Critics' Choice Awards	Best Director	Minari	Nominated	
2021	Critics' Choice Awards	Best Original Screenplay	Minari	Nominated	
2021	Critics' Choice Awards	Best Foreign Language Film	Minari	Won	
2021	Directors Guild of America Awards	Outstanding Directing	Minari	Nominated	
2021	BAFTA Awards	Best Film Not in the English Language	Minari	Nominated	
2021	BAFTA Awards	Best Director	Minari	Nominated	
2021	Academy Awards	Best Director	Minari	Nominated	
2021	Academy Awards	Best Original Screenplay	Minari	Nominated	
2021	Detroit Film Critics Society	Best Director	Minari	Nominated	
2021	Detroit Film Critics Society	Best Original Screenplay	Minari	Won	

Directed Academy Award performances
Under Chung's direction, these actors have received Academy Award nominations (and one win) for their performances in their respective roles.

Year	Performer	Film	Result
Academy Award for Best Actor
2020	Steven Yeun	Minari	Nominated
Academy Award for Best Supporting Actress
2020	Youn Yuh-jung	Minari	Won
