= Munyurangabo =

2007 Rwandan drama film

- Directed by: Lee Isaac Chung
- Written by: Lee Isaac Chung; Samuel Gray Anderson
- Produced by: Lee Isaac Chung
- Starring: Jeff Rutagengwa
- Cinematography: Lee Isaac Chung
- Edited by: Lee Isaac Chung
- Music by: Claire Wibabara
- Distributed by: Almond Tree Films
- Release date: 24 May 2007 (Cannes Film Festival)
- Running time: 97 minutes
- Countries: Rwanda; United States
- Language: Kinyarwanda

Munyurangabo is a 2007 drama film directed by Lee Isaac Chung. Filmed entirely in Rwanda with local actors, it is the first narrative feature film in the Kinyarwanda language. It premiered in the Un Certain Regard section at the 2007 Cannes Film Festival on 24 May and won the Grand Prize at the 2007 AFI Fest. American critic Roger Ebert called it "in every frame a beautiful and powerful film — a masterpiece."

== Plot ==
After stealing a machete from a market in Kigali, Munyurangabo and his friend Sangwa leave the city to return to their villages. Munyurangabo seeks justice for his parents, who were killed in the 1994 genocide against the Tutsi in Rwanda, while Sangwa wants to return to the home he had left years ago. Although the two boys had planned to stay for only a few hours, they end up spending several days. But, because they are from two different tribes, their friendship is sorely tried. Sangwa's parents distrust Munyurangabo and warn their son that the Hutus and Tutsis are supposed to be enemies.

== Cast ==
- Jeff Rutagengwa as Munyurangabo
- Eric Ndorunkundiye as Sangwa
- Jean Marie Vianney Nkurikiyinka as Papa Sangwa
- Jean Pierre Harerimana as Gwiza
- Narcicia Nyirabucyeye as Mama Sangwa
- Edouard B. Uwayo as Poet

== Production ==
According to The New York Times, prior to the making of the film, director Lee Isaac Chung's wife Valerie, an art therapist, had traveled to Rwanda as a volunteer to work with those affected by the 1994 genocide. At her urging, Chung accompanied her to Rwanda and volunteered to teach a filmmaking class at a relief base in Kigali in the summer of 2006. Sensing an opportunity to present the contemporary reality of Rwanda, and to provide his students with practical film training, Chung arrived with a nine-page outline which he had written with the help of old friend (and the film's eventual co-producer and co-writer) Samuel Gray Anderson. Chung shot Munyurangabo over eleven days, working with a team of non-professional actors Chung found through local orphanages and his students as crew members.

== Critical reception ==
Munyurangabo has received highly positive reviews from critics. The review aggregator website Rotten Tomatoes reported that 93% of critics have given the film a positive review with an average rating of 7.92/10, based on 25 reviews.

Roger Ebert called Munyurangabo "in every frame a beautiful and powerful film — a masterpiece." In his 2007 Cannes Film Festival review, Variety critic Robert Koehler described it as "by several light years -- the finest and truest film yet on the moral and emotional repercussions of the 15-year-old genocide that wracked Rwanda." Writing in Film Comment, the late critic Robin Wood similarly described the film as a "masterpiece" and "an authentically beautiful film".

== Subsequent development ==
Lee Isaac Chung continues to mentor young Rwandan filmmakers through Almond Tree Rwanda, the outpost in Rwanda for his U.S.-based production company, Almond Tree Films. Almond Tree Rwanda has produced several acclaimed shorts that have traveled to international festivals.

== Awards ==
Official Selection

- 2007 Cannes Film Festival
- Toronto International Film Festival
- Busan International Film Festival
- 2008 Berlin International Film Festival
- Sarajevo International Film Festival
- Rotterdam Film Festival
- Maryland Film Festival
- New Directors/New Films Festival at the Museum of Modern Art
- Buenos Aires International Festival of Independent Cinema
- AFI Fest 2007- Grand Prize
- Amiens 2007
- Independent Spirit Awards 2008- Someone to Watch (Nominee)
- Gotham Awards 2008- Breakthrough Director (Nominee)
