= Gacaca court =

System of community justice used in Rwanda after the 1994 genocide

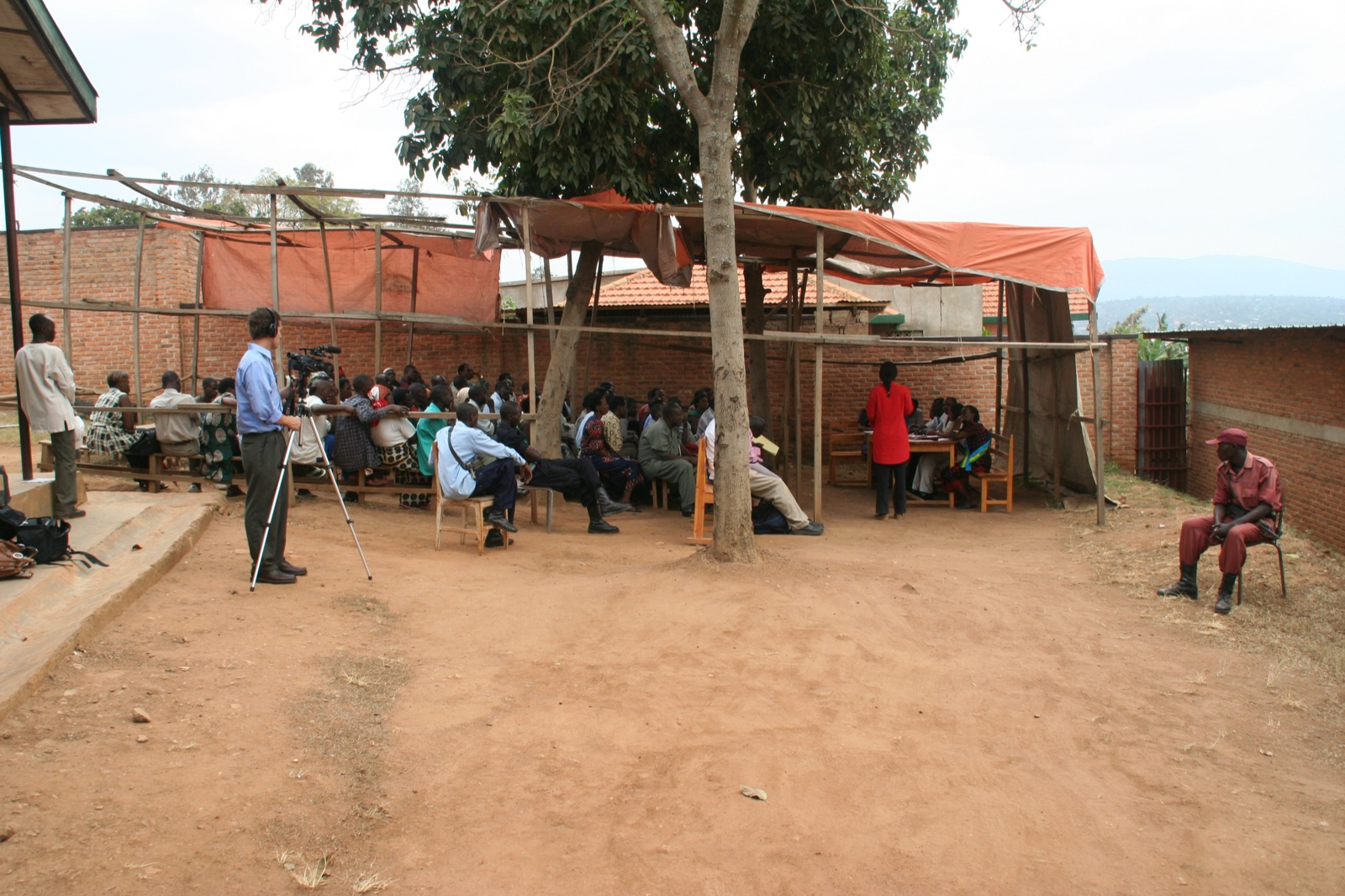
A Gacaca trial

The Gacaca courts (Kinyarwanda: [ɡɑ.t͡ʃɑ̌ː.t͡ʃɑ]) were a system of transitional justice in Rwanda following the 1994 genocide. 'Gacaca', meaning "short grass" referred to the public space where neighborhood male elders (abagabo) would meet to solve local problems. The name was chosen in 2001 for the national criminal justice system created in order to try those implicated in the 1994 Rwandan genocide, during which 520,000 to 702,000 people were killed. In 1994, the United Nations Security Council created the International Criminal Tribunal for Rwanda to try high-ranking government and army officials accused of genocide, war crimes, and crimes against humanity. Legally established in 2001, the Gacaca courts began conducting trials in 2002 and proliferated throughout the country by early 2007. The Gacaca courts were presented as a method of transitional justice, claimed by the Rwandan government to promote communal healing and rebuilding in the wake of the genocide.

The system has received various criticisms. The Survivors Fund, which represents survivors of the genocide, worried the Gacaca courts put survivors in danger of reprisal. Incidents of survivors being targeted for providing evidence at the courts have been detailed in a number of a reports. Scholars have shown how the courts became a critical mechanism for establishing the government's official narrative on the genocide, recognizing only Tutsi as victims and Hutu as perpetrators. Natacha Nsabimana, Assistant Professor of Anthropology at the University of Chicago describes how the Gacaca system reinforced a temporal and social framework she termed 'genocide-time,' where "genocidal violence in the past is recounted and made agentive in the present through social interactions and choices made by political subjects in their social-political landscape." She contends this perception influences daily interactions and the collective psyche, complicating genuine reconciliation. Furthermore, Nsabimana points out that the official narrative promoted by Gacaca often oversimplifies the complex identities and histories of individuals, grouping them into broad categories of 'victim' and 'perpetrator,' which does not necessarily reflect their lived realities and personal histories.

== History of Gacaca ==
Within 17th century Rwanda, prior to colonization, the extended lineage or family (umuryango), which encompassed several households (inzu), was the main unit of social organization within Rwandan society. The status of people within families was based upon the age and sex of the person. Only older married men, without living parents, were independent while all others, especially women, were to be dependent and subservient to men. The family lineage controlled arranged marriages, ancestral traditions and ceremonies, payment or retrieval of debts, and was the primary source of security.

Ruling over these lineages were kings (mwami) presiding over their respective kingdoms. The king, within Rwandan society, embodied power, justice, and knowledge and was responsible for mediating major disputes within his region. However, before disputes were brought to the kings, they were heard locally by wise men in Gacaca gatherings.

The name Gacaca is derived from the Kinyarwanda word umucaca meaning "a plant so soft to sit on that people prefer to gather on it". Gacaca gatherings were meant to restore order and harmony within communities by acknowledging wrongs and pursuing justice for the victim.

The colonization of Rwanda and introduction of Western law systems transformed Rwandan society, with Rwandans going to westernized courts to settle disputes. As the kings and wise men declined in legitimacy, Gacaca courts began to dwindle.

== Post-genocide Gacaca ==
After the genocide, the new Rwandan government struggled to prosecute the approximately 130,000 alleged perpetrators. Originally, they were to be tried in the International Criminal Tribunal for Rwanda (ICTR). Lacking the resources to organise first-world courts, the Gacaca system was seen as a means of preventing communities and individuals from seeking revenge.

The goal of the Gacaca courts was to:

- Establish truth about what happened
- Accelerate the legal proceedings for those accused of genocide crimes
- Eradicate the culture of impunity
- Reconcile Rwandans and reinforce their unity
- Use the capacities of Rwandan society to deal with its problems through justice-based Rwandan customs

The categorization of Gacaca courts in Rwanda is based on the concept of a cell and a sector. A cell is equivalent to a small community while a sector is equivalent to a small group of cells making up a village. Within these two categories, there were 9013 cells and 1545 sectors, with over 12,103 Gacaca courts established nationwide. Presiding over the Gacaca meetings were inyangamugayo (judges). These judges were elected to serve on a nine-person council. During the Gacaca process, there were two phases. Starting between 2005 and 2006, information was taken from those who were accused from all Gacaca cells. The approximate number of those who were accused was 850,000, 50,000 of which were deceased.

The 850,000 accused were charged according to the categories in the table below.

=== June 2004–March 2007 ===
Type	Category 1	Category 2 (1st & 2nd)	Category 2 (3rd)	Category 3
Crime:	1. Planners, organizers, supervisors, ringleaders; 2. Persons who occupied positions of leadership 3. Well-known murderers 4. Torturers 5. Rapists 6. Persons who committed dehumanizing acts on a dead body	1. ‘Ordinary killers’ in serious attacks; 2. Those who committed attacks in order to kill but without attaining this goal	Those who committed attacks against others, without the intention to kill	Those who committed property offences
Court:	Ordinary Court	Sector Gacaca	Sector Gacaca	Cell Gacaca
Sentence:	No data	No data	No data	No data
Without confession:	Death Penalty or Life imprisonment	25-30 Years	5-7 Years	Civil Reparation
Confession before appearance on the list of suspects	25-30 Years	7-12 Years	1-3 Years	Civil Reparation
Confession after appearance on the list of suspects	25–30 Years	12-15 Years	3-5 Years	Civil Reparation
Accessory sentence	Perpetual and total loss of civil rights	Permanent loss of a listed number of civil rights	/	/

=== March 2007 onwards ===
Type:	Category 1	Category 2 (1st, 2nd, & 3rd)	Category 2 (4th&5th)	Category 2 (6th)	Category 3
Crime:	1. Persons who occupied positions of leadership; 2. Rapists	1. Well-known murderers; 2. Torturers 3. Persons who committed dehumanizing acts on a dead body	1. ‘Ordinary killers’ in serious attacks; 2. Those who committed attacks in order to kill but without attaining this goal	Those who committed attacks against others, without the intention to kill	Those who committed property offences
Court:	Ordinary Court	Sector Gacaca	Sector Gacaca	Sector Gacaca	Cell Gacaca
Sentence:	No data	No data	No data	No data	No data
Without confession:	Life imprisonment	30 years or Life imprisonment	15-19 Years	5-7 Years	Civil Reparation
Confession before appearance on the list of suspects	20-24 Years	20-24 Years	8-11 Years	1-2 Years	Civil Reparation
Confession after appearance on the list of suspects	25-30 Years	25-29 Years	12-14 Years	3-4 Years	Civil Reparation
Accessory sentence	Permanent loss of a listed number of civil rights	No confession: permanent loss Confession: temporary loss of a listed number of civil rights	No confession: permanent loss Confession: temporary loss of a listed number of civil rights	/	/

The approximate number of people who were to be tried in these three categories:

Category 1: 77,269

Category 2: 432,557

Category 3: 308,739

== Predecessors and partners in justice ==
The spontaneous emergence of the Gacaca activities and the gradual support for Gacaca by the authorities was motivated by the fact that the ordinary justice system was virtually non-existent after the genocide. The Gacaca had to do what it did before—relieve the pressure on the ordinary law courts, which had worked slowly before the genocide and had ground to a halt during the violence. After the genocide ended and law courts reopened they were quickly overloaded by the cases of genocide suspects who were filling the prisons. The new Gacaca system was not unprecedented, bearing similarities to Truth and Reconciliation Commissions (TRC). South Africa's TRC bore the slogan “Revealing is Healing” and operated under the belief that truth-telling served as a “therapeutic function”. Rwandan government heard suggestions to establish its own TRC, but ultimately chose the more historically and culturally familiar Gacaca system.

The International Criminal Tribunal for Rwanda (ICTR), established in 1995, operated simultaneously with the Gacaca courts. It has indicted 93 people for crimes committed during the genocide. The United Nations Security Council established the ICTR to "prosecute persons responsible for genocide and other serious violations of international humanitarian law committed in the territory of Rwanda and neighbour States, between 1 January 1994 and 31 December 1994". The ICTR is located in Arusha, Tanzania, and has offices in Kigali, Rwanda. Its Appeals Chamber is located in The Hague, Netherlands. The ICTR has played a pioneering role in the establishment of a credible international criminal justice system and is the first ever international tribunal to deliver verdicts in relation to genocide, and the first to interpret the definition of genocide set forth in the 1948 Geneva Conventions. It also is the first international tribunal to define rape in international criminal law and to recognise rape as a means of perpetrating genocide.

The ICTR delivered its last trial judgement on 20 December 2012 in the Ngirabatware case. Following this milestone, the Tribunal's remaining judicial work now rests solely with the Appeals Chamber. As of October 2014, only one case comprising six separate appeals is pending before the ICTR Appeals Chamber. One additional appeal from ICTR trial judgement was delivered in December 2014 in the Ngirabatware case by the appeals chamber of the Mechanism for International Criminal Tribunals, which started assuming responsibility for the ICTR's residual functions on 1 July 2012. The ICTR's formal closure is scheduled to coincide with the return of the Appeals Chamber's judgement in its last appeal. Until the return of that judgement in 2015, the ICTR will continue its efforts to end impunity for those responsible for the Genocide through a combination of judicial, outreach, and capacity-building efforts. Through these efforts, the ICTR will fulfil its mandate of bringing justice to the victims of the Genocide and, in the process, hopes to deter others from committing similar atrocities in the future.

== Successes ==
Rwanda's experiment in mass community-based justice has been a mixed success. Rwandans are deeply divided on the benefits of Gacaca. Rwandan government supporters (including foreign academics and local Rwandans) claim it has shed light on what happened in their communities during the 100 days of genocide in 1994. Many Rwandans critical of the government see it as a means of distorting the events of 1994 and disseminating "lies". Scholars have shown that it became a means of silencing alternative narratives amongst the Rwandan population and effectively worked as a form of "show trial". Other scholars praise it for helping families find the bodies of their lost relatives, which could then be properly buried. It has also ensured that tens of thousands of perpetrators were brought to justice. Some Rwandans say that it has helped set in motion reconciliation within their communities. The majority of praise for Gacaca comes from Rwanda's government itself and Rwandans who experienced the system directly. Some of the latter, who were among those most affected by the Rwandan genocide, praise the system for providing a sense of closure, acceptance, and forgiveness after each trial concludes. The Gacaca trials also served to promote reconciliation by providing a means for victims to learn the truth about the death of their family members and relatives. They also gave perpetrators the opportunity to confess their crimes, show remorse and ask for forgiveness from their community.

== Criticisms ==
=== Legal criticism ===
The casual format of Gacaca has led to many legal criticisms. Participants lacked numerous rights and privileges common to Western courts. They had had no right know the charges levied against them, no right to a lawyer or the presumption of innocence, no right to be present at their own trial or to request time to prepare their case and no right against confront witnesses. Furthermore, they had no right against self incrimination, double jeopardy, or arbitrary arrest and detention. Furthermore, there was vast evidence of corruption among officials. "You have to give money. Gacaca judges are not paid so they make arrangements to get money from those who are accused," said a man accused of genocide who claimed to have bribed the judges. The lack of legal representation is largely a result of the genocide itself, during which the vast majority of legal professionals became victims. The courts would instead rely on unpaid and untrained "people of integrity", including some genocide perpetrators, to serve as judges, lawyers, and the jury.

Senior Human Rights Watch adviser Alison Des Forges said the lack of legal representation was a serious concern. "The authorities' view is that this is a quasi-customary kind of procedure, and there never used to be lawyers, so there's no need for lawyers now. The problem with that is that little is the same except for the name. In this system, there is considerable weight given to the official side. The office of the prosecutor provides considerable assistance to the bench [of judges] in terms of making its determination, so you no longer have a level playing field." There may, however, be no alternative to the Gacaca trials, she added. "Obviously the problem of delivering justice after the genocide is an overwhelming problem. Gacaca may not be ideal but there is at this point no alternative.... The official explanation I think is that people did not speak openly until the Gacaca process and now many more accusations are surfacing. Also, the concession program, which requires the naming of all those who participated along with the accused [in return for a lighter sentence], has led to a multiplication of names. "How many of these are well-founded, what is the credibility of the evidence, these are very serious concerns."

There are criticisms and controversy surrounding the decision to implement Gacaca courts. Human rights groups worry about the fairness since trials are held without lawyers which means that there is less protection for defendants than in conventional courts. In addition conventional trials have seen false accusations and intimidation of witnesses on both sides; issues of revenge have been raised as a concern. The acquittal rate has been 20 percent which suggests a large number of trials were not well-founded. Also because the trials are based on witnesses' testimonies, the length of time between the crime and trial heightens the risk that the witnesses' memories will be unreliable.

=== Removal of RPF crimes ===
The government's decision to exclude crimes committed by soldiers of the current ruling party, the RPF, from Gacaca courts' jurisdiction has left victims of their crimes still waiting for justice, Human Rights Watch said. Soldiers of the RPF, which ended the genocide in July 1994 and went on to form the current government, killed tens of thousands of people between April and December 1994. In 2004, the Gacaca law was amended to exclude such crimes, and the government worked to ensure that these crimes were not discussed in Gacaca.

"One of the serious shortcomings of gacaca has been its failure to provide justice to all victims of serious crimes committed in 1994", Bekele said. "By removing RPF crimes from their jurisdiction, the government limited the potential of the gacaca courts to foster long-term reconciliation in Rwanda."

"The biggest problem with gacaca is the crimes we can't discuss. We're told that certain crimes, those killings by the RPF, cannot be discussed in gacaca even though the families need to talk. We're told to be quiet on these matters. It's a big problem. It's not justice," said a relative of a victim of crimes by soldiers of the current ruling party.

=== Reconciliation ===
Though Gacaca was claimed to contribute to reconciliation by the Rwandan government it functioned fundamentally as a punitive form of justice which many scholars have characterized as retributive in focus rather than reconciliatory in nature. Punishments ranged from forced labor in public works projects (TIG) to life in prison without family visits ("special measures"). Despite its claimed restorative nature, Gacaca is a legal process and with this in mind punishment constitutes a major element of the Gacaca courts. According to official Rwandan government records the courts had a conviction rate of 86% and tried over a million suspects.

The criticism of the gacaca system notwithstanding, the locally held courts helped complementing the otherwise international legal system (which one could justifiably assert being "Eurocentric") capable of administrating justice. While the sheer quantity of committed wrongdoings would overwhelm the ordinary legal institutions, the locally kept courts, despite their legal shortcomings which indeed incurred justified criticism, offered a significant venue in the reconciliatory process, namely offering the victims to be heard, to confront the perpetrator and go on record about the committed wrongdoings. As such, unlike some other cases where the victims complained about being totally ignored and never having the opportunity to be heard or their perpetrators never being held responsible for their committed wrongs, the gacaca courts, by offering the venue for recognition of the wrongs and the involved parties (especially by identifying the victim and perhaps also the perpetrator), in many cases administering some sorts of justice and reparation (around 12,000 community-based courts were held, hearing over 1.2 million cases throughout the country). Thus, although not perfect, the gacaca courts managed to convey the Rwandan nation along the reconciliatory path, especially through engaging the public from a bottom-up perspective (the top-down being represented by the national legal system and the International Criminal Tribunal for Rwanda), incorporating the memories of the genocide into the national and the international narrative respectively.

== See also ==
- Court of law
- Crime against humanity
- Ethnic cleansing
- History of Rwanda
- Politics of Rwanda
- Rwandan genocide
- Survivors Fund
- International Criminal Tribunal for Rwanda

== Sources ==
- Harrell, Peter E., Rwanda's Gamble: Gacaca and a New Model of Transitional Justice. New York: Writer's Advantage Press, 2003.
- Human Rights Watch (2004). Struggling to Survive: Barriers to Justice for Rape Victims in Rwanda (PDF) (Report). New York: Human Rights Watch.
- Ingelaere, Bert., 2016. Inside Rwanda's Gacaca Courts: Searching Justice after Genocide. Madison: University of Wisconsin Press (ISBN 978-0-299-30970-1).
- Reyntjens, Filip and Stef Vandeginste. 2005. "Rwanda: An Atypical Transition." In Roads to Reconciliation, edited by Elin Skaar, et al. Lanham, MD: Lexington Books.
- Stover, Eric and Weinstein, Harvey (2004). My Neighbor, My Enemy: Justice and Community in the Aftermath of Mass Atrocity. Cambridge: Cambridge University Press. ISBN 0-521-54264-2.

== Literature ==
- Buckley-Zistel, Susanne (2006): 'The Truth Heals?' Gacaca Jurisdictions and the Consolidation of Peace in Rwanda. Die Friedens-Warte Heft 1–2, pp. 113–130.
- Clark, Phil (2012) "How Rwanda judged its genocide" London: Africa Research Institute
- Clark, Phil (2010) The Gacaca Courts, Post-Genocide Justice and Reconciliation in Rwanda: Justice Without Lawyers. Cambridge: Cambridge University Press.
- Simon Gabisirege/Stella Babalola (2001): Perceptions about the Gacaca Law in Rwanda. Baltimore: Johns Hopkins University.
- Geraghty, Mark Anthony. 2020. Gacaca, Genocide, Genocide Ideology: The Violent Aftermaths of Transitional Justice in the New Rwanda. Comparative Studies in Society and History, Vol. 62, Issue 3, p. 588–618.
- Ingelaere, Bert., (2016) Inside Rwanda's Gacaca Courts: Searching Justice after Genocide. Madison: University of Wisconsin Press (ISBN 978-0-299-30970-1).
- Longman, Timothy (2017) Memory and Justice in Post-Genocide Rwanda. New York: Cambridge University Press.
- Stover, Eric and Harvey Weinstein (eds) (2004) My Neighbor, My Enemy: Justice and Community in the Aftermath of mass Atrocity. Cambridge: Cambridge University Press.
