= Sometimes in April =

2005 television historical drama film

- Written by: Raoul Peck
- Directed by: Raoul Peck
- Starring: Idris Elba; Oris Erhuero; Carole Karemera; Debra Winger
- Music by: Bruno Coulais
- Countries of origin: Rwanda; France; United States
- Original languages: English; Kinyarwanda

Production
- Producer: Daniel Delume
- Cinematography: Éric Guichard
- Editor: Jacques Comets
- Running time: 140 min.

Original release
- Network: HBO
- Release: February 17, 2005

Sometimes in April is a 2005 American made-for-television historical drama film about the Rwandan Genocide, written and directed by the Haitian filmmaker Raoul Peck. The ensemble cast includes Idris Elba, Oris Erhuero, Carole Karemera, and Debra Winger. The story centers around Augustin Muganza, a moderate Hutu military captain who struggles to find closure after bearing witness to the killing of nearly 1 million Tutsis and moderate Hutus in 100 days, while becoming divided by politics and losing some of his own family. The film intersperses between the genocide in 1994, and April 2004, when Augustin is invited by his brother, Honoré Butera, to visit him as he stands trial for his involvement in the genocide.

In addition to Augustin's tribulations, the film depicts the attitudes and circumstances leading up to the outbreak of brutal violence, the intertwining stories of people struggling to survive genocide, and the aftermath as the survivors try to find justice and reconciliation. The story is also intercut with scenes of Prudence Bushnell, Deputy Assistant Secretary of State for African Affairs for American President Bill Clinton, and her failed attempts to stop the genocide and advise the American government and public to acknowledge the unfolding genocide.

The film was nominated for multiple awards, including a Primetime Emmy Award nomination for Outstanding Music Composition for a Miniseries, Movie, or Special to the composer of the film, Bruno Coulais. It is one of the first large-scale films about the genocide to be filmed in Rwanda.

== Plot ==
=== 1994 ===
Augustin Muganza, a captain in the Rwandan Armed Forces, lives in Kigali with his wife Jeanne, a Tutsi hospital worker with whom he has two sons, Yves-André and Marcus, and a daughter, Anne-Marie, who is staying in an all-girls Catholic boarding school 150 kilometres from Kigali. Despite constant political disagreement, he remains in close contact with Honoré, a pro-Hutu Power radio personality working for Radio Télévision Libre des Mille Collines (RTLM). Augustin is also friends with Xavier Muyango, a fellow Hutu officer and fiancé to Felicie, a Tutsi.

By April 1994, the power-sharing agreement between the Hutu-dominated Rwandan government and Paul Kagame's Tutsi-led Rwandan Patriotic Front (RPF) is breaking down as President Juvénal Habyarimana is viewed by Hutus to be conceding too far in favor of the Tutsis. Despite history of anti-Tutsi violence by hardline Hutus earlier in the Rwandan Civil War and warnings from Honoré and the Hutu ranks in the government that violent action from Hutu extremists may recur, Augustin insists on taking the position of a moderate and remaining in the country to Jeanne's disapproval. On the night of April 6, Habyarimana is killed when his plane is shot down and Prime Minister Agathe Uwilingiyimana is assassinated by government soldiers the following morning, reigniting the civil war and signaling the start of mass killings of Tutsis and moderate Hutus by génocidaires comprising pro-Hutu government soldiers and militiamen backed by Hutu extremists, who were prior civilians, indoctrinated by Hutu Power propaganda.

In response to the outbreak of violence, Xavier and Felicie seek refuge at Augustin's home. Fearing danger to his family, Augustin calls on Honoré to use his influence in the community to safely transport his family and Felicie to the Hôtel des Mille Collines, which is harboring refugees, while confident that Anne-Marie is out of harm's way. As Augustin learns from Honoré that he is documented as a Tutsi sympathizer by the government, he elects to stay at home alongside Xavier until it is safe to head to the hotel. On route, Honoré manages to slip his passengers through génocidaire roadblocks, but is stopped at an unexpected military checkpoint, where the group is detained and a scuffle ensues.

After a few days of hiding, Augustin and Xavier escape the house and trail a UNAMIR convoy evacuating expatriates, but are separated from the convoy at a militia roadblock when the officer in charge of the convoy refuses to help. Augustin's life is spared but Xavier is executed as he has been branded a traitor on the radio. Augustin eventually reaches the hotel but is unable to locate his family, and remains there for the rest of the genocide. Meanwhile, Jeanne awakens in shock without her sons at the Sainte-Famille Church over a week after the altercation at the checkpoint. Felicie is later seen lined up for execution by the church building.

Génocidaires eventually breach the school Anne-Marie resides at to screen for Tutsi elements, confronting Martine, a teacher at the school sheltering a group of students, including Anne-Marie, in a dormitory. The students rally behind Martine in solidarity as Martine refuses to divide them into Hutus and Tutsis, only for the group to be indiscriminately slaughtered by gunfire from government soldiers. Martine and Victorine, a fellow student, survive and find Anne-Marie alive but mortally wounded; as they escape, Anne-Marie eventually dies. The two soon find safety among the thick vegetation of the Kayumba swamps, where they are rescued by advancing RPF soldiers.

Towards late-July, the RPF has scored massive territorial gains while members of the Hutu political and military elite and Hutu civilians flee the country out of fear of reprisal from the RPF, ending the civil war and the genocide. Augustin seeks out Anne-Marie at her school, only to find Martine and another woman tending to bodies in the dormitory where the massacre occurred. He grieves when Martine confirms that Anne-Marie is dead.

=== 2004 ===
Haunted by the events in 1994 and resigning to never learn of what had become of Jeanne and his sons, Augustin finds work as a school teacher and lives unmarried with Martine, who remains traumatized by her experience at her old school. Around the tenth anniversary of the start of the genocide, Augustin receives a letter from Honoré expressing interest to discuss in person the fates of Jeanne and his first sons. Honoré has been detained in Arusha, Tanzania, where he is tried by the International Criminal Tribunal for Rwanda for his role at RTLM, after being on the run until his arrest in Italy in 1997.

On Martine's insistence, Augustin reluctantly flies to Tanzania to attend the trial hearings as a visitor, dithering to meet Honoré. Furious to learn that those charged for inciting the genocide live in relative luxury with ample medication and meals while regular Rwandans struggle to survive, Augustin doubts remaining in Tanzania. His stance softens when he befriends Valentine, another genocide survivor. She invites him to listen to her testify in court as an anonymous witness, where he hears of the constant rape she endured in the hands of Interahamwe militiamen while as a mother of a baby. Augustin eventually learns that Valentine is caring for two young sons.

Inspired by Valentine's courage to testify, Augustin is motivated to meet Honoré. At the meeting, Honoré recounts the events that unfolded at the checkpoint to the hotel in 1994: The soldiers were ordered to kill Jeanne, Yves-André and Marcus due to their Tutsi lineage. Augustin's sons were promptly shot dead, but in their excitement, the soldiers presumed Jeanne was also dead despite only being knocked unconscious by a rifle butt. Honoré hid Jeanne in a ditch, before carrying her to the safety of the church at night. For objecting to the kill order, Honoré was listed as a traitor and lost his privilege for safety, forcing him into exile and being unable to aid Jeanne any further. Honoré would later learn that while Jeanne was initially safe and pleaded to join Augustin at the hotel, she was raped by soldiers after the military began to probe the church for Tutsis. With the imminent threat of being killed, Jeanne sacrificed herself with a grenade to save a few rape victims and inflict injury on her aggressors.

Reflecting on Honoré's revelation, Augustin finally finds peace and returns to Rwanda to raise his new family with Martine, who is now expecting a son. The film closes with Martine reconciling with her past by laying flowers at the remains of the school dormitory before attending a nearby Gacaca court to recount her experiences in the genocide.

== Cast ==
- Idris Elba as Captain Augustin Muganza
- Oris Erhuero as Honoré Butera
- Carole Karemera as Jeanne
- Debra Winger as Prudence Bushnell
- Noah Emmerich as Lionel Quaid
- Pamela Nomvete as Martine
- Fraser James as Xavier Miango
- Abby Mukiibi Nkaaga as Colonel Théoneste Bagosora
- Aïssa Maïga as Young Militant
- Michael Wawuyo as RAF Soldier #8

== Production and release ==
In contrast to Hotel Rwanda, which was rated PG-13 and had most of the genocide violence subtly implied rather than explicitly shown, this film was noted for its more gruesome and graphic portrayal of the violence, which gave it a TV-MA rating. In addition, various scenes set in Rwanda were shot on location in and around Kigali, with prominent landmarks such as Hôtel des Mille Collines and the Sainte-Famille Church featured.

The film originally aired on HBO. It was later broadcast by PBS and followed with a panel discussion by journalist Jeff Greenfield with Paul Bonerwitz and other speakers.

== Themes ==
=== Memory ===
Augustin experiences frequent spells of guilt in parts of the film set in 2004. In his first scene in the film, a schoolgirl asks him if the genocide could have been stopped, and he responds, "maybe if we were more courageous." His character, in searching for internal reconciliation for witnessing the genocide, represents the collective Rwandan experience, and how memory can come from unexpected places – such as how annual rainfall in the month of April became a stark reminder of the genocide that began in April 1994. Despite wishing to move on from the past and marry his companion Martine, Augustin cannot find closure without fully understanding and processing the events of the genocide, and director Raoul Peck structures the film in a way where the audience learns the fate of his family as he does, only coming to terms with the truth when fully knowledgeable of the history behind it.

=== Justice ===
Director Raoul Peck juxtaposes indigenous and Western judicial systems to compare if justice is achieved and how they protect witnesses. Many of the scenes set in 2004 are centered around justice, either following the court proceedings of the ICTR, specifically Honoré's trial and Valentine's testimony, or a Gacaca court – "a local grassroots form of restorative justice" according to Leshu Torchin. While the ICTR was better equipped to broadcast the history of the genocide to the world, Peck illustrated that they became bogged down in questions of whether members of the RTLM were culpable of genocide despite never firing a single bullet. Meanwhile, intermittent scenes of a Gacaca court showed conversations among a large group exclusively in Kinyarwanda, not in English like most of the film, and without translation subtitles. The Gacaca court involved witnesses speaking to large groups about what they saw, sometimes directly in front of the defendants. While implied that the truth is more likely to surface compared to the ICTR, where the Gacaca court falls short in the film is the protection of witnesses. As Valentine is able under the cover of anonymity to recount her full story of the violence she experienced, her faceless testimony motivates Augustin to find closure in the past.

== See also ==
- 100 Days (2001 film), a 2001 drama film directed by Nick Hughes dramatizing events during the Genocide against Tutsi in 1994.
- Hotel Rwanda, a 2004 film dealing with the genocide that centers on the Hôtel des Mille Collines, a location also seen in Sometimes in April.
- A Sunday in Kigali (French title: Un Dimanche à Kigali), a 2006 Canadian feature film by Robert Favreau set during the genocide against Tutsi. It is based on the novel A Sunday at the Pool in Kigali by Gil Courtemanche.
- Shake Hands with the Devil, a 2007 film based on the book of the same name recounting General Dallaire's harrowing personal journey during the 1994 Genocide against Tutsi and how the United Nations failed to heed Dallaire's urgent pleas for further assistance to halt the massacre.
- Shooting Dogs, a 2005 film centered on the École Technique Officielle in Kigali.
