= David Belton =

British film director, producer and writer

- Occupations: Director; Film Producer; Writer

David Belton is a director, writer, and film producer. His experiences as a BBC reporter covering the 1994 Rwandan genocide led him to write the original story and produce the film Shooting Dogs, directed by Michael Caton-Jones, which dramatizes the events at the Ecole Technique Officielle. It was retitled Beyond the Gates for its 2007 U.S. release. He has directed documentaries (for the BBC, Simon Schama's Power of Art, "The Silent War") and drama-documentaries and documentaries for PBS (God in America and The Amish) and dramas for the BBC (Ten Days to War). His book, When the Hills Ask for Your Blood was published in January 2014 by Doubleday.

== Partial credits ==
- 1990, producer, BBC programme Newsnight with Peter Barron in 1990.
- 1997 Writer and Director, "Soldiers to Be" for BBC Documentaries.
- 2000 Writer and Director, "Lost Seoul", BBC Reputations documentary on Olympic sprinter, Ben Johnson.
- 2002, producer and director, Nova episode, "Volcano's Deadly Warning".
- 2003, deputy editor, BBC's This World, TV documentary, War Spin: Jessica Lynch.
- 2003, executive producer, "Exclusive to Al-Jazeera"
- 2003, executive producer, The Real Dr. Evil, BBC documentary about Kim Jong Il.
- 2005, Producer and co-writer, Shooting Dogs, directed by Michael Caton-Jones and written by David Wolstencroft with John Hurt, Hugh Dancy, Dominique Horwitz.
- 2006, director, BBC's Simon Schama's Power of Art Season 1 episode "Vincent van Gogh".
- 2007, executive producer, Windscale: Britain’s Biggest Nuclear Disaster, TV documentary narrated by Caroline Catz.
- 2008, director, 10 Days to War, written by Ronan Bennett, with Kenneth Branagh, Juliet Stephenson, Tom Conti.
- 2010, Series Director and writer, "God in America", with Michael Emerson and Toby Jones. [url=https://www.pbs.org/wgbh/americanexperience/films/godinamerica/
- 2012, Writer and Director of "The Amish", for PBS's American Experience.[url=
- 2014, Author "When The Hills Ask For Your Blood" [url=http://www.randomhouse.co.uk/editions/when-the-hills-ask-for-your-blood/9780385615648
- 2014 Book Review, The Independent
- 2015 Writer/Director, BBC2 "Nelson in His Own Words".
- 2016 Writer/Director, Netflix, "Captive".
- 2018 Writer/Director, Amazon, "This is Football".
- 2021 Writer/Director, BBC, "Blair and Brown: the New Labour Revolution".https://www.theguardian.com/tv-and-radio/2021/oct/04/blair-brown-the-new-labour-revolution-review-the-ruthless-rise-of-no-10s-odd-couple
- 2021 Writer/Director, MSNBC Films, "Memory Box - Echoes of 9/11"
- 2023 Writer/Director, Canal+, "Ukrainian Storybox, Voices of War"

== Honours ==
- 2006, nomination, Carol Foreman Award for the Most Promising Newcomer, BAFTA Awards
- 2008, nomination, Best Drama-Documentary, Ten Days to War, (Grierson Awards)
- 2012, nomination, Exceptional Merit in Documentary Filmmaking, Primetime Emmy Awards http://www.emmys.com/sites/emmys.com/files/EmmyNoms64-Press-Release-6.pdf
- 2022, nomination, Best History Documentary, Memory Box - Echoes of 9/11, (Grierson Awards)
