= Black (2008 film) =

- Film poster
- Directed by: Pierre Laffargue
- Screenplay by: Lucio Mad; Gábor Rassov
- Produced by: Moctar Bâ; Lauranne Bourrachot; Marco Cherqui
- Starring: MC Jean Gab'1; Carole Karemera
- Cinematography: Patrick Ghiringhelli; Alexandre Tyl
- Edited by: Céline Kélépikis
- Music by: Aline Afanoukoe; Vincent Quittard; Jean-Jacques Mondoloni; Julien Lefèvre; Luc Porthault
- Production company: Chic films
- Distributed by: Wide Management
- Release dates: June 2008 (Avignon Film Festival); 15 July 2009 (France)
- Running time: 111 minutes
- Country: France
- Language: French

Black is a 2008 French blaxploitation film directed by Pierre Laffargue.

== Synopsis ==
Black, a Frenchman with African roots, commits in France a heist with some complices. The early arrival of alarmed police kindles a shooting. Black's complices are killed and he can only scarcely escape by jumping from a bridge onto a running train. When he is all alone in his hideout, he receives a long-distance call from a cousin in Africa. Black is asked to rob diamonds from a bank. His cousin makes him believe this was easily done.

Black travels consequently to Africa. Once there, he has to realise that the responsible Africans he intends to rob are more sophisticated than he had thought. Moreover, a group of Russian soldiers of fortune also wants to steal the diamonds. Black outsmarts them and retrieves the diamonds during their holdup. Unfortunately his cousin tries to betray him. That is his cousin's downfall.

Now all on his own, Black is caught by a feisty female police agent. Soon both are hunted by vengeful former Russian commandos. While trying to elude, they get entangled in a local mystic prophecy and their struggle is lifted to a higher, supernatural level.

== Cast ==
- MC Jean Gab'1 as Black
- Carole Karemera as Pamela
- François Levantal as Degrand
- Mata Gabin as Fatoumata
- Anton Yakovlev as Ouliakov
- Christophe Aquillon

== Festivals ==
- Festival du film d'Avignon 2008
- SXSW Film Festival - Fantastic Fest at Midnight 2009
- Seattle International Film Festival 2009
- Fantasia 2009
- Film 4 FRIGHT FEST at London 2009
- Toronto After Dark Film Festival 2009
- Fresh Film Fest 2009 (Karlovy Vary, Czech Republic)

== International Release ==
- Canada : Montreal: July 31, 2009 / Quebec & Sherbrooke: August, 2009
- Canada in DVD on October 6, 2009
