= Stefan Stec =

Stefan Stec may refer to:

- Stefan Stec (Polish aviator) (1893–1921), Polish military aviation pioneer
- Stefan Stec (UN peacekeeper) (1964–2005), Polish Armed Forces major
