= Mata Gabin =

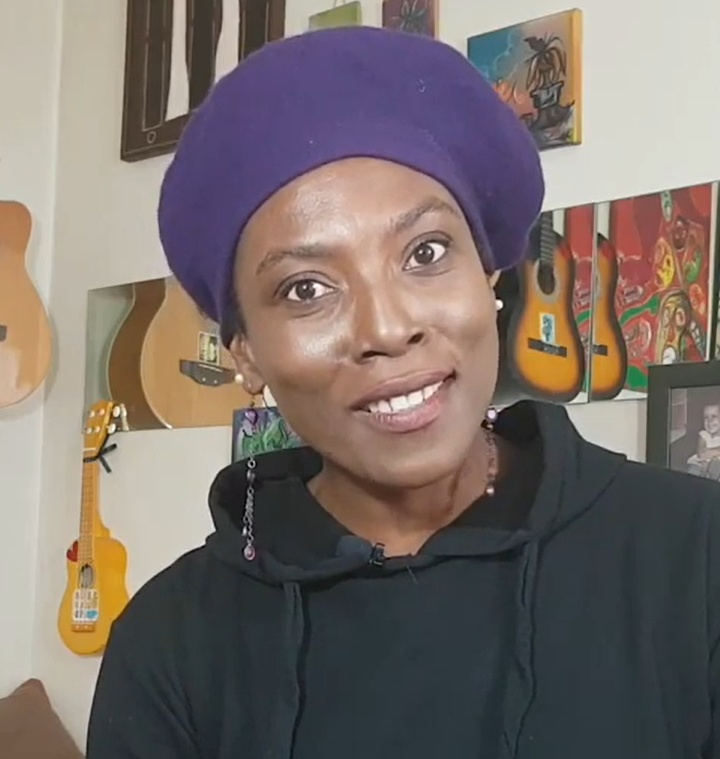
- Gabin in 2018
- Born: 27 February 1972 (age 54); Toulépleu, Ivory Coast
- Occupations: Actress, comedienne
- Years active: 1995–present

Mata Gabin is an actress, author, and actress of theatre, born in 1972 in Toulépleu, Ivory Coast. She is of French nationality.

== Biography ==
She was born on the border of Liberia and Ivory Coast, to a Liberian-Guinean mother and a father from Martinique. She was adopted at three years of age by her uncle and her aunt from Corsica. At an early age, Gabin was cared for by her Argentinian grandmother and her Italian husband. She has now been living in Paris for more than ten years and has played various roles in both theater and film. Gabin also writes her own scripts, preferably at dusk. She is a highly professional artist but is also known as being "down to earth", with a great sense of humor.

== Theater ==
Year	Title	Author	Director
1995	Britannicus	Jean Racine	Tola Koukoui
1996	Sula	Toni Morrison	Maïmouna Coulibaly
1997	Au bon maquis	Daizy Watoso	Daizy Watoso
1999	Histoires naturelles	Jules Renard	Hervé Colin
2000	Lucrezia Borgia	Victor Hugo	Fabrice Merlo
2001	I have a dream	Vincent Byrd Le Sage	Vincent Byrd Le Sage
2001	J'hallucine	Marc Hollogne	Marciel
2003	Madame Huguette et les Souches	Julius-Amédée Laou	Julius-Amédée Laou
2004	La Femme d'un autre	Claudine Cohen	Claudine Cohen
2005	Twelve Angry Men	Reginald Rose	Tola Koukoui (2)
2005	Slogans	Soudaieva Volodine	Bérangère Bonvoisin
2005	L'Envol	Nathalie Guisset	Nathalie Guisset
2006	The Tragedy of King Christophe	Aimé Césaire	Benjamin Jules Rozet
2006	Outre ciel	Léopold Sédar Senghor, Gustave Akakpo & Tanella Boni	Anne-Sylvie Meyza & Luis Marquez
2006	Fam Kiroul Namaspamouss	Mata Gabin	Mata Gabin
2006-07	The Blacks	Jean Genet	Chrystèle Alves Meeira
2009-10	Bintou	Koffi Kwahulé	Laetitia Guedon
2010	Penda	Sandra Nkaké	Sandra Nkaké
2010	Betty ou la mélodie des souvenirs	Mata Gabin	Mata Gabin (2)
2011-12	Mata la mytho	Mata Gabin	Mata Gabin (3)
2012	Butterfly	Joël Dragutin	Diane Calma

== Filmography ==
Year	Title	Role	Director	Notes
1997	U.Man	The woman	Julien Dajez	Short
1997	La cité des alouettes	Yassa	Luc Béraud	TV movie
1999	Evamag	Maïmouna	Agnès Boury	TV series (1 episode)
2000	Lumumba	Helene Bijou	Raoul Peck	
2001	Les p'tits gars Ladouceur	The nurse	Luc Béraud (2)	TV movie
2002	Mama Aloko	Eve	Jean Odoutan	
2002	Georges chez les tops		Olivier Chrétien	Short
2002	Angelina		Claude d'Anna	TV movie
2003	Monsieur Ibrahim	Fatou	François Dupeyron	
2003	Dyschromie		Julien Bossé	Short
2004	La valse des gros derrières	Akwélé	Jean Odoutan (2)	
2004	Vie sur Mars	The woman	Carlo Avventi	Short
2004	P.J.	Sabine Amoris	Gérard Vergez	TV series (1 episode)
2005	La barrière des préjugés	Virginie	Foued Mansour & Luc Saint-Eloy	Short
2006	L'année suivante		Isabelle Czajka	
2006	Lettres de la mer rouge	Fatouma	Emmanuel Caussé & Eric Martin	TV movie
2007	Déjà vu	Fatou	Guillaume Bonnier	Short
2007	Kull !	Nkruma's wife	Anders Skog	Short
2007	Greco	Arleth Shenge	Philippe Setbon	TV series (6 episodes)
2008	With a Little Help from Myself	Marijo	François Dupeyron (2)	
2008	Expectations	The woman	Mahamat Saleh Haroun	Short
2008	Sex, Okra and Salted Butter	Hortense	Mahamat Saleh Haroun (2)	TV movie
2008	La mort dans l'île	Judge Rorcher	Philippe Setbon (2)	TV movie
2008	Femmes de loi	Rose Decastel	Hervé Renoh	TV series (1 episode)
2008	Groupe flag	Sandy	Michel Hassan	TV series (1 episode)
2008	Scénarios contre les discriminations		Blandine Lenoir	TV series (1 episode)
2009	Black	Fatoumata	Pierre Laffargue	
2009	La première étoile	The barber's client	Lucien Jean-Baptiste	
2009	Machination	Sista	Arnaud Demanche	Short
2009	Plan cul	Mata	Olivier Nicklaus	Short
2009	À la lune montante	Intervener	Annarita Zambrano	Short
2010	La métaphore du manioc	The woman	Lionel Méta	Short
2010	Nola		Askia Traoré	Short
2010	Kennedy's Brain	Lucinda	Urs Egger	TV movie
2010	Sœur Thérèse.com	The judge	Bertrand Van Effenterre	TV series (1 episode)
2010	Julie Lescaut	Claude Kalou	Didier Delaître	TV series (1 episode)
2011	Les Petits Meurtres d'Agatha Christie	Esméralda	Eric Woreth	TV series (1 episode)
2011–present	Deux flics sur les docks	Lucie Dardenne	Edwin Baily	TV series (6 episodes)
2012	Par amour	Elisabeth	Laurent Firode	
2012	Bye Bye Blondie	The maid	Virginie Despentes	
2013	Des étoiles	Rose	Dyana Gaye	
2014	Lune noire	Entité	Gallien Guibert	Short
2015	Le bleu blanc rouge de mes cheveux	Djenabou	Josza Anjembe	Short
2015	Accusé	Catherine	Didier Bivel	TV series (1 episode)
2016	Le pantin	The customs	Mallory Grolleau	

== See also ==
- Cinema of France
