= B. Monkey =

1998 film directed by Michael Radford

- DVD cover
- Directed by: Michael Radford
- Screenplay by: Chloe King; Michael Radford; Michael Thomas
- Based on: B. Monkey by Andrew Davies
- Produced by: Nik Powell; Colin Vaines; Stephen Woolley
- Starring: Asia Argento; Jared Harris; Rupert Everett; Jonathan Rhys Meyers
- Cinematography: Ashley Rowe
- Edited by: Joëlle Hache
- Music by: Luis Enríquez Bacalov; Jennie Muskett
- Distributed by: Miramax Films
- Release dates: 6 November 1998 (UK); 10 September 1999 (U.S.)
- Running time: 92 minutes
- Countries: United States; United Kingdom
- Languages: English; Italian; French
- Box office: $39,371 (USA)

B. Monkey is a British-American 1998 neo-noir crime film directed by Michael Radford. Originally, Michael Caton-Jones was attached to direct the adaptation of the homonymous 1992 book by Andrew Davies, but left over creative differences.

== Plot ==
The story begins in London. Alan is a reserved primary school teacher with a romantic bent, moonlighting as a night DJ for a hospital where he plays the work of jazz musicians like Django Reinhardt. Beatrice is a professional thief who gained the moniker B. Monkey for her ability to “get into anything”. She and fellow thief Bruno live with Paul, a drug dealer, and the three maintain a vaguely polyamorous relationship. While Beatrice cares deeply for Paul and Bruno, viewing them as family, she starts to consider leaving her criminal life as B. Monkey behind her. The three get in a fight in a pub when Paul tells Bruno he is no longer welcome in his house, which Alan witnesses. Alan is captivated by Beatrice and pursues her, but she initially rebuffs his advances. However, she later shows up at his DJ booth to reconcile.

Beatrice gets an offer to pull off a robbery for a gangster named Frank, who she, Bruno and Paul have worked for before, but she declines. Beatrice remains on good terms with Paul, but becomes concerned for Bruno, who has been left vulnerable after being kicked out of the house.

Beatrice and Alan spend a weekend in Paris in a deliberate attempt to get more familiar with each other. The trip starts awkwardly, but after visiting a jazz club, Alan’s erectile dysfunction is cured, and the two have sex for the first time. Beatrice moves in with Alan, but her inability to give up her criminal tendencies causes tension between the two.

Paul falls into debt with Frank while Bruno becomes increasingly isolated. At his teaching job, Alan begins to suspect his student Ricky is being abused at home, and opens a case against the parents, who threaten Alan’s position. Beatrice reluctantly agrees to help Bruno pull off Frank’s robbery in exchange for Bruno helping to intimidate Ricky’s parents. While this successfully gets the parents to drop the charges, Alan is angered by Beatrice playing dirty, and still decides to pursue a teaching position in Yorkshire. The jewellery robbery does not go as smoothly as planned, and Bruno risks himself in order to get Beatrice out of the building. The two have a fight and Bruno drives off without her. Beatrice decides to move to Yorkshire with Alan, giving Paul money to pay off Frank before she leaves.

Alan and Beatrice rent a cottage and begin to settle into a quieter life in the countryside. Beatrice calls Paul from a local mechanic’s shop to check in on him, and while she refuses to tell Paul where she went, Paul is able to trace her location through call return. Paul shows up at the cottage looking to hide from Frank, but Frank, along with Bruno, find the mechanic’s phone number in Paul’s flat. Frank and Bruno eventually show up at the cottage themselves, seeking both Paul and Beatrice. A standoff ensues, but it ends with Bruno shooting Paul and Frank, then turning his gun on Alan. Bruno begs Beatrice to come back with him, but Beatrice instead chooses Alan, who proves his willingness to risk his life for Beatrice by standing up to Bruno. Bruno leaves in Paul’s car, taking the bodies with him, and allows the couple to resume their new life together.

== Cast ==
- Asia Argento as Beatrice/B. Monkey
- Jared Harris as Alan Furnace
- Rupert Everett as Paul Neville
- Jonathan Rhys Meyers as Bruno
- Julie T. Wallace as Mrs. Sturge
- Ian Hart as Steve Davis
- Tim Woodward as Frank Rice
- Bryan Pringle as Goodchild

== Production ==
In her autobiography, star Argento said she had an affair with director Radford during filming. Argento had earlier accused producer Harvey Weinstein of sexual assault during the same time period.

== Reception ==
Film review aggregator website Rotten Tomatoes gave the film a rating of 60% based on 20 reviews. Metacritic has the film listed as a 49 out of 100, indicating mixed reviews, based on 10 critics.

Anita Gates of The New York Times had a mixed review of the film but thought highly of the actors:

The best part of B. Monkey is reveling in the dark side of Rupert Everett. The dissolute Rupert Everett. Rupert Everett, drinking and drugging, destroying his chiseled good looks and recklessly putting his life in danger... which is where the second-best part of B. Monkey comes in: Jared Harris, who is becoming one of the most fascinating actors around.

== Soundtrack ==
- "Billets Doux" performed by Django Reinhardt
- "De Camptown Races"
- "They Can't Take That Away from Me" performed by Peggy Lee
- "Trash" performed by Suede
- "Souvenirs" performed by Django Reinhardt
- "Love Anybody You Want" performed by Barcode
- "Life Goes On and On" performed by 9 Lazy 9
- "Two Hearts Entwine"
- "Glory Box" performed by Portishead
- "Imagination" performed by Chet Baker
- "Look Who's Perfect Now" performed by Transistor
- "You're the First, the Last, My Everything" performed by Barry White
- "Chinese Burn" performed by Curve
- "I'm goin round in circles" performed by Jimmy Witherspoon
- "Tarantelle del Gargano" performed by La Nuova Compagnia di Canto Popolare
- "D'Amour L'ardent Flamme" performed by The Wiener Volksopernorchester
- "Sweet Jane" performed by Cowboy Junkies
- "Tupelo Honey" performed by Cassandra Wilson

== Creative differences ==
In October 2017, Michael Caton-Jones revealed that he had chosen Sophie Okonedo, to star. However, the producer, Harvey Weinstein, decided the actress wasn't "fuckable". Caton-Jones and Weinstein discussed the matter heatedly, and Caton-Jones said, "'Don't screw up the casting of this film because you want to get laid', whereupon he went mental." Weinstein then leaked to Variety that Caton-Jones had walked off the movie due to "creative differences". Argento, who replaced Okonedo, was one of three women who in 2017 were reported in The New Yorker to have been raped by Weinstein; she said that she submitted to Weinstein because, "I felt I had to, because I had the movie coming out and I didn't want to anger him."
