= Van Morrison in Ireland =

Video by Van Morrison
- Released: 1981
- Recorded: February 1979
- Genre: Various
- Length: 56:28
- Label: Hendring Ltd./Angle Films Ltd.
- Director: Mike Radford
- Producer: Rex Pyke

Van Morrison chronology
Van Morrison in Ireland (1981)	Van Morrison The Concert (1990)

Van Morrison in Ireland is the first official video by Northern Irish singer-songwriter Van Morrison, released in 1981 of a concert Morrison recorded in Northern Ireland in 1979. It was directed by Michael Radford who later became a noted filmmaker. The video includes footage of the band whilst touring in Ireland and images of Belfast, including Hyndford Street and Cyprus Avenue. Tony Stewart of the NME states, "The band display a range of textures reminiscent of The Caledonia Soul Orchestra, first with the dark resonance of Toni Marcus' violin, then Pat Kyle's bright sharp tenor sax and finally Bobby Tench's prickly electric guitar".

This concert featured the band with which Morrison recorded his 1978 album Wavelength, augmented by a horn section and violinist. The concert included two songs from Wavelength, the title track and "Checkin' It Out". The rest of the songs had originally been recorded at least seven years earlier, the latest of these being "Saint Dominic's Preview" from 1972. Also on the video are two songs Morrison had recorded when fronting the band Them in the mid 1960s — "Don't Look Back" and "Gloria".

== Recording ==
The film consists of a combination of performances of ten tracks recorded in Belfast and Dublin in February 1979. This was the first time that Morrison had played in his native Belfast since 1965.

== Songs ==
Brian Hinton's review of the whole concert:

They open with "Moondance", Katie Kissoon taking a verse, then a slightly ponderous "And It Stoned Me", then flow gracefully "Into the Mystic". As this is not 1970, they then come bang up to date with a rocky "Wavelength", the "poised blues" of "Don't Look Back" and a rolling "Wild Night". Katie Kissoon sings "Crazy Love", "with Kyle's flute circling, dipping and gliding off Peter Bardens' delicate piano phrasing". Van is back for "Checkin' it Out", with John Altham on baritone sax, then it's "Kingdom Hall" and a raft of classics, a jangly and ragged "Moonshine Whiskey", a controlled "Tupelo Honey". On "Saint Dominic's Preview", when Van reaches the line about "it's a long way back to Belfast city" the crowd explode, as do Van's lungs on "I've Been Working", blowing the guts out of his harmonica. Indeed they are part of the performance, adding to the inspiration. They shout fruitlessly for "Gloria", between a ten-minute "Caravan" and a final encore of "Cyprus Avenue", where Van laughs, shouts, and falls to the ground.

== Track listing ==
All songs by Morrison unless noted

1. Intro. – 0:47
2. "Moondance" – 3:56
3. "Checkin' It Out" – 3:08
4. "Moonshine Whiskey" – 6:10
5. "Tupelo Honey" – 6:09
6. "Wavelength" – 6:20
7. "Saint Dominic's Preview" – 6:46
8. "Don't Look Back" (John Lee Hooker) – 4:26
9. "I've Been Working" – 5:33
10. "Gloria" – 3:41
11. "Cyprus Avenue" – 9:32

== Personnel ==
=== Musicians ===
- Van Morrison – vocals, acoustic guitar
- Peter Bardens – piano, organ, synthesizer
- Bobby Tench – lead guitar, backing vocals
- Mickey Feat – bass guitar
- Peter Van Hooke – drums
- Herbie Armstrong – rhythm guitar, backing vocals
- Pat Kyle – tenor saxophone
- John Altman – alto and baritone saxophones
- Toni Marcus – violin, stroviola
- Katie Kissoon – vocals on "Moondance", backing vocals
- Anna Peacock – backing vocals

=== Production ===
- Director – Michael Radford
- Producer – Rex Pyke
- Sound – Mick Glossop
- Photography – Roger Deakins, Bill Marshall, Jeff Bains, Christopher Morphet

== Source ==
- Hinton, Brian (1997). Celtic Crossroads: The Art of Van Morrison, Sanctuary, ISBN 1-86074-169-X
