= Tupelo Honey =

Studio album by Van Morrison
- Released: 15 October 1971
- Recorded: Spring–Summer 1971
- Studios: Wally Heider (San Francisco); Columbia (San Francisco)
- Genres: Rock; folk rock; blue-eyed soul; country rock
- Length: 40:42
- Label: Warner Bros.
- Producers: Van Morrison, Ted Templeman

Van Morrison chronology
His Band and the Street Choir (1970)	Tupelo Honey (1971)	Saint Dominic's Preview (1972)

Singles from Tupelo Honey
- 1. "Wild Night" Released: 1 September 1971; 2. "Tupelo Honey" Released: December 1971; 3. "(Straight to Your Heart) Like a Cannonball" Released: March 1972

Tupelo Honey is the fifth studio album by Northern Irish singer-songwriter Van Morrison. It was released in October 1971 by Warner Bros. Records. Morrison had written all of the songs in Woodstock, New York, before his move to Marin County, California, except for "You're My Woman", which he wrote during the recording sessions. Recording began at the beginning of the second quarter of 1971 at Wally Heider Studios in San Francisco. Morrison moved to the Columbia Studios in May 1971 to complete the album.

The namesake for the album and its title track is a varietal honey produced from the flowers of the tupelo tree found in the Southeastern United States. The album features various musical genres, most prominently country, but also R&B, soul, folk-rock. and blue-eyed soul. The lyrics echo the domestic bliss portrayed on the album cover; they largely describe and celebrate the rural surroundings of Woodstock and Morrison's family life with then-wife Janet "Planet" Rigsbee.

Tupelo Honey received most of its success in the USA; it charted at number 27 on the Billboard charts and, in 1977, was certified gold by the RIAA. It failed to reach any of the European or other worldwide charts. The album yielded two hit singles, the hymn-like title track, and the R&B-flavoured "Wild Night". The third released single, "(Straight to Your Heart) Like a Cannonball", was less successful and did not enter the Billboard Hot 100. The album received mostly positive reviews from music critics at the time of its release, but Morrison's biographers were less favourable towards it in later years.

== Background ==
Prior to the Tupelo Honey recording sessions, Morrison had recorded demo tracks in Woodstock for an upcoming country music album. Some of the tracks planned for Tupelo Honey did appear on the album, but other more traditional country songs like "The Wild Side of Life", "Crying Time" and "Banks of the Ohio" were abandoned. Morrison decided to move from Woodstock when the lease on his house expired and the landlord wanted to move back in. He explained to Richard Williams in Melody Maker that the release of the 1970 film Woodstock about the Woodstock Festival had altered the quaint character of the community: "Everybody and his uncle started showing up at the bus station, and that was the complete opposite of what it was supposed to be." In April 1971, before he began recording on the planned album, Morrison and his family moved to Marin County, California, where his wife, Janet Planet, had family living close by. Morrison's guitarist at the time, John Platania, told biographer Steve Turner that Morrison "didn't want to leave, but Janet wanted to move out West. He was manipulated into going." The Morrisons' new home was in a rural setting situated on a hillside close to San Francisco amid redwood trees. With the move, Morrison abandoned the idea of a full country album and exchanged some of the intended material for songs he had written earlier.

Morrison was under pressure by Warner Bros. Records to produce chart singles and two albums within a year. His previous album, His Band and the Street Choir, had been released in November 1970. In an interview with journalist Sean O'Hagan in 1990, he described this period as being in contrast to the laid-back atmosphere pictured on the album cover: "When I went to the West Coast these people [the musicians he had been working with in Woodstock] weren't that available so I had to virtually put a completely new band together overnight to do [Tupelo Honey]. So it was a very tough period. I didn't want to change my band but if I wanted to get into the studio I had to ring up and get somebody. That was the predicament I was in."

== Recording ==
Due to the location of the recording sessions of Tupelo Honey, having moved from New York to California, the only musicians from Morrison's previous band that could work with him were saxophonist Jack Schroer and his wife Ellen (who contributed backing vocals). However, two of the three percussionists on the album had recorded with him in the past; Connie Kay contributed drums to Astral Weeks, and Gary Mallaber played drums and vibraphone on Moondance. On this album, Kay played drums on four songs, and new recruit Rick Shlosser was used for the remaining tracks, while Mallaber played percussion and vibraphone. Biographer Howard DeWitt was convinced that Morrison's music benefited from his move to California, as he comments that "the musical explosion in Marin County also added a great deal to Van's music. In particular, Ronnie Montrose's guitar work made Tupelo Honey a rock classic." Mark Jordan and John McFee made up the rest of the rhythm section. The remaining members of the horn section were Bruce Royston and "Boots" Houston on flutes and Luis Gasca on trumpet. The band was augmented by producer Ted Templeman, who contributed organ to the title track.

The first recording sessions took place in the spring of 1971 at the Wally Heider Studios in San Francisco and continued for three weeks. Only four of the songs recorded were chosen for Tupelo Honey: "Wild Night"; "Moonshine Whiskey"; "I Wanna Roo You" and "Like a Cannonball". Rick Shlosser and John McFee played on these tracks, but were dropped from the second sessions. Engineer Stephen Barncard remembered that "We'd get the band rehearsed, then Ted Templeman would go to the hotel, pick up Van ... We did one or two takes, he'd go back to the hotel and the band would go on to the next tune."

Morrison relocated in the late spring of 1971 to the Columbia Studios, San Francisco to record a second session of tracks for the album. This time Morrison rehearsed the songs before recording began, which helped the sessions run more smoothly. "You're My Woman" was recorded a few days after the other songs, with Rick Shlosser back playing drums.

The vocals on the album were always live after rehearsing each song five or six times, according to saxophonist and flautist "Boots" Houston, who further commented that when Morrison and the band went into the studio: "we would then just play a whole set straight through without repeating anything. We would have played maybe twenty songs and Van would go back and cut out the songs he didn't want. The only time we'd go back would be to overdub backing vocals or horns." Ted Templeman remarked that he had to go through three engineers during the recording of the album, due to Morrison's "ability as a musician, arranger and producer": "When he's got something together, he wants to put it down right away with no overdubbing ... I've had to change engineers who couldn't keep up with him."

== Composition and themes ==
The rural setting in Marin County furnished the backdrop for the domestic bliss associated with the album, and the songs' lyrics contained harmonious references to the "good life at home". In an interview given to New Spotlight magazine at the time, Morrison's wife, Janet Planet, referred to Morrison's dislike of socializing at this time: "Really he is a recluse. He is quiet. We never go anywhere. We don't go to parties. We never go out. We have an incredibly quiet life and going on the road is the only excitement we have." Although Morrison said that the songs on the album "had been hanging around for awhile" and according to biographer Steve Turner they were written in Woodstock, musician Ronnie Montrose recalled that Morrison wrote one of the tunes, "You're My Woman", while sitting at the piano during the recording sessions in California.

The album opens with "Wild Night", a hybrid of R&B, soul and country music influences, which uses a moderate 4/4 time signature and features the lead guitar playing of Ronnie Montrose. The song's intro was created, according to Montrose, when "One afternoon I was messing around with what is now the intro on the record, [Van] stopped me and ... said ' ... that thing you just played ... that's the intro, don't forget it'". This guitar-driven intro in Clinton Heylin's opinion made it one of Morrison's most memorable singles. "Wild Night", which has been described by biographer Ken Brooks as "a great start to the album", was first recorded after the Astral Weeks sessions in Autumn 1968 and was re-recorded numerous times before its eventual release on Tupelo Honey. Morrison recalled during an interview that the song was originally "a much slower number, but when we got to fooling around with it in the studio, we ended up doing it in a faster tempo."

"(Straight to Your Heart) Like a Cannonball" combines a moderately swung waltz with blue-eyed soul. The song boasts a cheery guitar riff accompanied by acoustic guitars and flutes. Lyrically the song praises nature as an easy solution to the stresses of life, referring possibly to both Woodstock and Marin.

"Old Old Woodstock" is a tribute to Morrison's previous life in upstate New York. The theme of domestic bliss is encapsulated in this song, as it shows a strong sensitivity towards children and family life. Howard Dewitt comments that "It is a moving and compelling look at a satisfying period in Van's life." Musically the song contains the music genres jazz and folk. Janet Planet served as the inspiration for the song and also performed backing vocals on the recording.

Jon Landau describes "Starting a New Life" as "both the simplest and lyrically the most significant cut on the album as Van spells out with perfect clarity the statement of Tupelo Honey: it expresses his need to take stock of himself, to see how far he has come, to record the support of those who have helped him get there, and together with them to 'start a new life.'"

The last song that was recorded for the album was "You're My Woman". This slow, blues-influenced ballad was influenced by Janet Planet. As perhaps a last-minute decision Morrison added this song to the album in place of "Listen to the Lion", just before it was released. The recording of "Listen to the Lion" was released a year later on Saint Dominic's Preview.

The title song, "Tupelo Honey", is a classic love ballad in a vein established with "Crazy Love" from the album Moondance. Both songs have the same melody and chord progression, and are in 4/4 time. Uncut reviewer David Cavanagh wrote: "On an album where the vocals are exultant to say the least, this song sees Morrison use larynx, diaphragm, teeth and tongue to find new ways of enunciating the lines 'she's as sweet as Tupelo honey' and 'she's all right with me', seemingly in ever-increasing adoration." Bob Dylan (who performed the song with Morrison during a concert tour in the 1990s) once remarked that "'Tupelo Honey' has always existed and that Morrison was merely the vessel and the earthly vehicle for it". Greil Marcus called the song "a kind of odyssey" evoking Elvis Presley (whose hometown was Tupelo, Mississippi), and "the most gorgeous number on the album" that "was too good not to be true."

"I Wanna Roo You (Scottish Derivative)" is a country-flavoured waltz that prominently features John McFee's steel guitar and Ronnie Montrose's mandolin. The "Scottish Derivative" subtitle refers to the word "roo" featured in the song, which is a Scottish slang word for "woo".

"When That Evening Sun Goes Down" is described by Erik Hage as a "hootenanny flavored" tune driven by "barrel-house honkey-tonk piano". Like "Wild Night", it was first recorded in Autumn 1968 and on various other recording sessions by Morrison before its release on Tupelo Honey. An alternative take of the song was featured as the B-side of the "Wild Night" single.

The final song, "Moonshine Whiskey", has been compared musically to the likes of the Band, (earlier in 1971 Morrison had worked with the Band in Woodstock). The song fluctuates between a slow 6/8 and a fast 4/4 time throughout. During the coda it accelerates to an abrupt ending. "Moonshine Whiskey" combines country rock and soul in a song that Morrison once spoke of as having been written for "Janis Joplin or something." (Joplin lived in Woodstock around the same time as Morrison.) There is also a comic element to the song with Morrison imitating fish blowing bubbles.

== Packaging ==
The title of the album derives from the varietal honey produced from the flowers of the tupelo tree found predominantly in Florida.

The photos on the album were taken by Michael Maggid, a friend of Morrison's then wife Janet Planet, in the town of Fairfax. The original LP was released in a gatefold sleeve. The cover photograph showed Planet, riding bareback on a horse, with Morrison walking alongside. The gatefold and back cover photographs showed Morrison perched upon the fence of the horse's paddock, with his wife standing to his right and a black-and-white kitten on the fence to his left. This rural setting depicting a bygone era was in vogue on album covers at the time as rock artists moved from cities to rural communities. The Band, CSNY, and Grateful Dead had similar themes on album covers in 1969 and 1970. Morrison later complained of the cover, explaining that, "The picture was taken at a stable and I didn't live there. We just went there and took the picture and split. A lot of people seem to think that album covers are your life or something."

== Release ==
Tupelo Honey was first released on LP in October 1971 on Warner Bros. Records. The album reached number 27 on the Billboard 200, which was the highest position reached in the US by any of Morrison's albums at that point. However it failed to reach any of the charts across Europe. By the middle of 1974 Tupelo Honey had sold well over 350,000 copies (50,000 more than Moondance), and in 1977 it was certified gold by the RIAA.

Three singles were released from the album. The first, "Wild Night", with a rare alternative take on "When That Evening Sun Goes Down" as the B-side, proved popular enough to reach number 28 on the US Billboard Hot 100. The single fared slightly better in The Netherlands, peaking at number 24. "Tupelo Honey" reached number 47 on the US singles chart, with the B-side "Starting a New Life". "(Straight to Your Heart) Like a Cannonball", with "Old Old Woodstock" as the B-side, was the third single from the album and only reached number 119, just outside the Billboard Hot 100.

The album was reissued on CD in 1990 by Polydor Records. Another CD reissue was released in 1997 by Polydor and Mercury Records. The 29 January 2008 reissued and remastered version of the album, released on CD, contains an alternate extended (5:32) take of "Wild Night" and a reworked cover version of the traditional song "Down by the Riverside". It was also reissued on vinyl, but without the bonus tracks.

As of 2025, the album has been long out of print on CD, vinyl and is unavailable on any streaming service with the exception of the album's title track and "Wild Night" which were featured on various Morrison compilation albums throughout his career.

== Critical reception ==
Professional ratings
Review scores
Source	Rating
AllMusic	4.5/5 stars
Christgau's Record Guide	A−
Goldmine	5/5 stars
Rolling Stone	5/5 stars
Uncut	4/5 stars
The Village Voice	A−
Encyclopedia of Popular Music	4/5 stars
Tom Hull	A−

Tupelo Honey was well received by critics upon the album's release. Jon Landau wrote in Rolling Stone: "Tupelo Honey is in one sense but another example of the artist making increased use of the album as the unit of communication as opposed to merely the song or the cut. Everything on it is perfectly integrated." ZigZag magazine reviewer John Tobler, who also reviewed the album just after its release, gave the album high praise, saying "If all music were as good as this, there wouldn't be any reason to make any more, because this is the real thing." Critic Dave Marsh called it "the perfect album for Van: he does everything...so incredibly well. There isn't a bad cut on it, of that I'm really sure." Robert Christgau from The Village Voice voiced reservations in his praise of the album, writing that it was "almost as rich in cute tunes as The Shirelles' Greatest Hits, but I worry that domestic bliss with Janet Planet has been softening Van's noodle more than the joy of cooking requires." Tupelo Honey was later ranked the fourth best album of the year in the Village Voice's first annual Pazz & Jop Critics Poll.

Morrison's biographers were less impressed by the album. Johnny Rogan commented: "Tupelo Honey was no masterpiece but it was a considerable improvement upon His Band and the Street Choir. At a time when the rock élite were seduced by the lovelorn laments and steel guitars of country rock, Morrison emerged with a work that offered a soulful romantic veneer without lapsing into banal sentimentality." Erik Hage held the opinion that by this time Morrison had become famous enough to be insulated from constructive criticism, resulting in some of the love songs to Janet Planet on the album containing: "obvious lyrical platitudes (truly some of his worst poetry since the revenge songs for Bang Records) and less-than-inspired arrangements."

It was ranked number 944 from votes taken in the third edition of Colin Larkin's All Time Top 1000 Albums in 2000.

== Aftermath ==
In 2009, music journalist Erik Hage wrote that Tupelo Honey "has become one of Morrison's most likeable albums, but the very elements that make it appealing to many—the homey feeling, the personal odes to married life—also make it a complacent album for an artist who had been pushing forward and challenging boundaries for the past few years."

Morrison was expected to tour to promote the album, but at this time he had developed a phobia about performing that was especially problematic when appearing before large audiences. John Platania was playing in concerts with Morrison and spoke of noticing his confidence ebbing away: "There were many times when he literally had to be coaxed on stage. His motto was 'The show does not have to go on'. He would create the choice of whether he would go on stage or not." Morrison announced before an impending performance at a larger venue that he was retiring from performing live. After regaining his confidence by making regular and informal performances at a small club near his home (the "Lion's Share" in San Anselmo California), he began to tour coast-to-coast again in 1972.

=== Morrison's response ===
Morrison said afterwards that he "wasn't very happy" with it. "It consisted of songs that were left over from before and that they'd finally gotten around to using. It wasn't really fresh. It was a whole bunch of songs that had been hanging around for a while. I was really trying to make a country and western album." He commented further that he seldom listened to it and had a bad taste in his mouth for both His Band and the Street Choir and Tupelo Honey.

== Track listing ==
All tracks are written by Van Morrison

Side one
No.	Title	Length
1.	"Wild Night"	3:33
2.	"(Straight to Your Heart) Like a Cannonball"	3:43
3.	"Old Old Woodstock"	4:17
4.	"Starting a New Life"	2:10
5.	"You're My Woman"	6:44

Side two
No.	Title	Length
1.	"Tupelo Honey"	6:54
2.	"I Wanna Roo You (Scottish Derivative)"	3:27
3.	"When That Evening Sun Goes Down"	3:06
4.	"Moonshine Whiskey"	6:48

2008 reissue bonus tracks
No.	Title	Length
10.	"Wild Night" (alternate take)	5:37
11.	"Down by the Riverside" (Traditional)	3:54

== Personnel ==
Musicians

- Van Morrison – rhythm guitar, harmonica, vocals, backing vocals
- Ronnie Montrose – electric and acoustic guitars, mandolin, backing vocals
- John McFee – pedal steel guitar
- Bill Church – bass
- Ted Templeman – organ on "Tupelo Honey"
- Mark T. Jordan– piano, electric piano
- Jack Schroer – alto, tenor and baritone saxophones
- Luis Gasca – trumpet
- Bruce Royston – flute
- "Boots" Houston – flute, backing vocals
- Ellen Schroer – backing vocals
- Janet Planet – backing vocals
- Rick Shlosser – drums
- Connie Kay – drums on "Starting a New Life", "Tupelo Honey", "When That Evening Sun Goes Down" and "Old Old Woodstock"
- Gary Mallaber – percussion, vibraphone

Production

- Producers: Van Morrison, Ted Templeman
- Engineers: Stephen Barncard, David Brown, Doc Storch
- Remixing: Lee Herschberg, Donn Landee
- Remastering: Ian Cooper
- Art direction: Ed Thrasher
- Photography: Michael Maggid
- Horn arrangements: Van Morrison, Jack Schroer
- Flute arrangements: "Boots" Houston on "Like a Cannonball", Bruce Royston on "Tupelo Honey"

== Charts ==
=== Weekly charts ===
Chart (1971)	Peak position
Australia (Kent Music Report)	33
US Billboard 200	27

=== Singles ===
Year	Single	Peak positions	
Year	Single	US	NL
1971	"Wild Night"	28	24
1972	"Tupelo Honey"	47	—
1972	"(Straight to Your Heart) Like a Cannonball"	119	—
"—" denotes releases that did not chart.
