= Gikondo massacre =

Event of the Rwandan Genocide

The Gikondo massacre was the mass murder of about 110 people of Tutsi identity, including children, who sheltered in a Polish Pallottine mission church in Gikondo, Kigali. The massacre took place on April 9, 1994 and was executed by Interahamwe militia under supervision of the Hutu presidential guard. The massacre was the first absolute proof of a genocide discovered by UNAMIR during the Rwandan genocide in 1994.

== Prelude ==
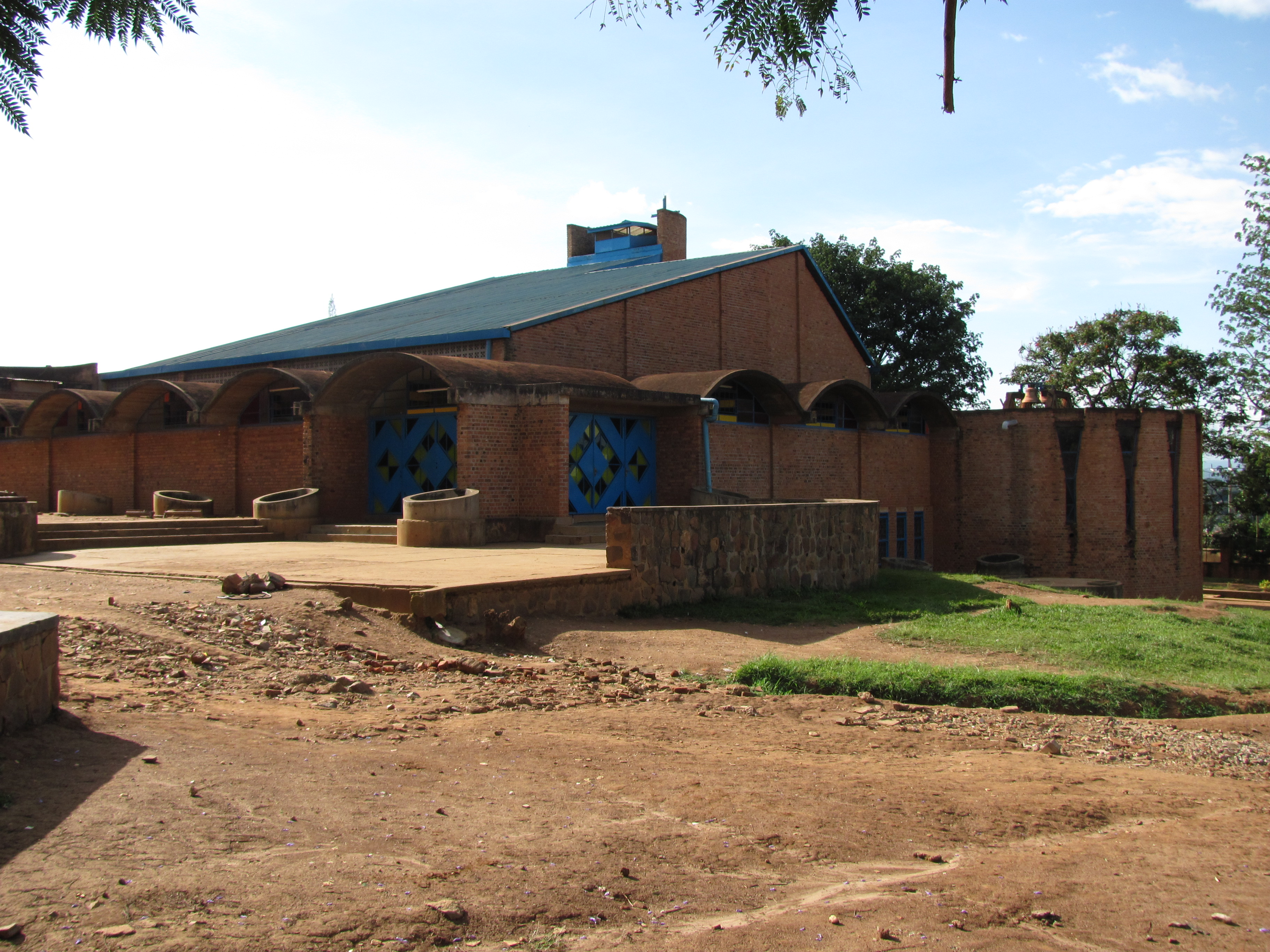
The church in Gikondo

The Rwandan genocide began on April 6, 1994, after the plane carrying Rwandan president Juvénal Habyarimana and Burundian president Cyprien Ntaryamira was shot down while approaching the runway of Kigali International Airport, which is considered to have been the direct signal to start the actions planned. Both men were Hutus. Interahamwe and Impuzamugambi militia began systematic, house-by-house searches for persons bearing Tutsi identity, who were then subsequently murdered using clubs and machetes. People living in the Gikondo neighborhood had fled to the Pallottine church in the hopes of finding shelter and to sit out the turmoil.

== The massacre ==
On the morning of April 9, 1994, two presidential guard soldiers and two gendarmes entered the church and began checking identity cards of the people gathered in the church. They ordered the few persons of Hutu identity to leave the church. One of the priests protested claiming that all of the people inside were Christian worshippers and the members of the Pallottine congregation, but was told by the gendarmes that "the church was harbouring inyenzi [cockroaches]" and the gendarmes continued to examine identity cards. A presidential guard officer entered the church, telling soldiers not to waste their bullets since the Interahamwe would soon come with machetes.

Shortly after, about 100 Interahamwe militiamen came into the church and began to kill people, striking with their clubs and slashing with their machetes, hacking arms, legs, genitals and the faces of the terrified people who tried to protect the children under the pews. Some people were dragged outside the church and attacked in the courtyard. The identity cards of the murdered ones were burned. The killing continued for two hours after which the whole compound was searched. The militia then left the church compound.

There were unarmed Polish UN observers in the church: Major Jerzy Mączka and Major Ryszard Chudy, who were supervising the implementation of the Arusha accords signed on August 4, 1993 on behalf of the UNAMIR. When the attack on the church began, Major Jerzy Mączka was in a garden near the church and tried to contact the UNAMIR headquarters in Kigali in order to direct some Belgian or Bangladeshi operational units to the church. Initially, all Motorola system channels were jammed with other calls for help. Eventually he managed to pass the report about the ongoing murders to UNAMIR duty officer, captain Godson Zowonogo. However the captain's response was negative – he argued that he had been informed about many similar events in the capital and that direct intervention of UNAMIR soldiers in all of these places was impossible. Major Mączka also tried to contact a duty officer of the predominantly Tutsi Rwandan Patriotic Front who was stationed in Kigali.

== Aftermath ==
The two Polish army officers along with the Pallottine priests and nuns began immediate first-aid dressing of the heavily wounded, separating them from the dead, who were dragged into two mass graves dug by trusted Pallottine workers. The job was very urgent due to the heat which would have accelerated the process of decomposition of the corpses. The wounded were carried back to the church, where Pallottine nuns provided them, in as far as possible, with water. On Major Mączka's directive, priests collected part of the half-burned identity cards of the dead so that they may be used to identify the buried corpses. Major Mączka also took pictures documenting the massacre.

In the afternoon of April 9, two International Red Cross ambulances with French medical teams and the chief ICRC delegate in Rwanda, Swiss Philippe Gaillard arrived. At the request of the two Polish army officers, two gravely wounded Rwandans were taken to hospital. They are believed to be the only persons who survived the massacre.

That same afternoon an UNAMIR armoured carrier arrived with Canadian Major Brent Beardsley and two other Polish army officers Major Marek Pazik and Major Stefan Stec, who filmed the aftermath of the massacre.

Another massacre took place a few days later in a private Pallotine chapel neighboring the church. About eleven Tutsi Rwandans including children who managed to survive the first attack on the church took refuge in the chapel, where Polish Pallotine Father Zdzisław gave them supplies necessary to survive. When Interahamwe members discovered that there were still refugees in the chapel, they burned it after dousing it in gasoline. No one survived.

The Gikondo massacre is under the jurisdiction of the International Criminal Tribunal for Rwanda.

== See also ==
- List of massacres in Rwanda
