= Carole Karemera =

Rwandan actress (born 1975)

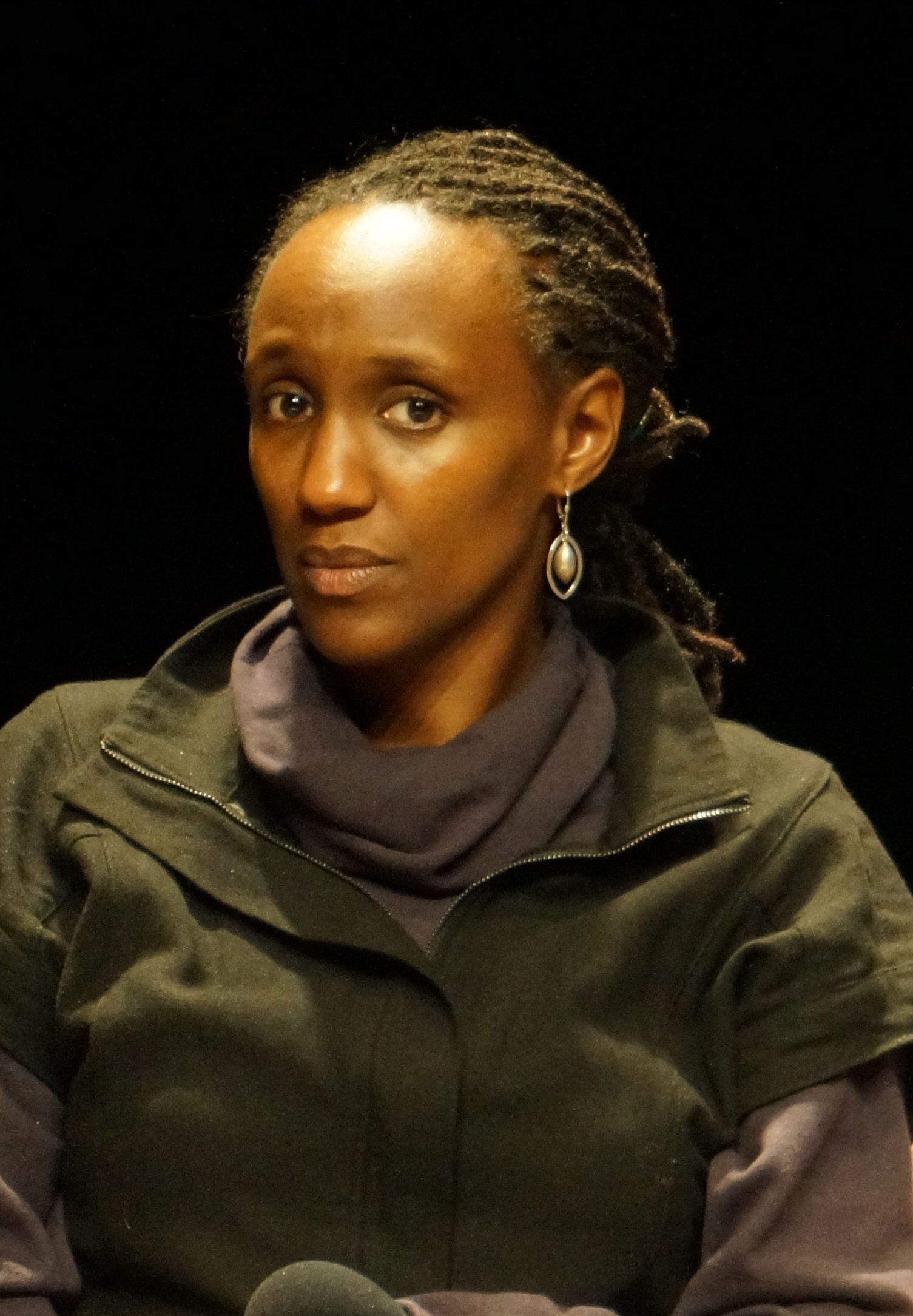
- Born: 1975 (age 50–51); Brussels
- Occupations: Actress, saxophone player, theater director, festivals producer and culture policy expert
- Website: www.ishyoartscentre.org

Carole Umulinga Karemera (born 1975) is a Belgian-born Rwandan actress, saxophone player, theater director, festivals producer and culture policy expert.

== Biography ==
She was born in 1975 in Brussels, the daughter of Rwandan exiles. As a child, Carole Karemera excelled at mathematics and dreamed of opening a bakery. Carole Karemera studied at the Royal Conservatory of Theater and Music in Belgium. In 1994, her father, a journalist, returned to Belgium as a result of the 1994 Genocide against the Tutsi in Rwanda. Carole Karemera first discovered Rwanda in 1995.

She performed in several plays, such as Battlefield by Peter Brook and Marie-Hélène Estienne, "We call it love " by Felwine Sarr, "Jaz" by Koffi Kwahulé, "Scratchin' the innerfields" by Wim Vandekeybus "The Bogus Woman' by Kay Adshead, and Anathema by Jacques Delcuvellerie, and simultaneously started her film career. Between 2000 and 2004, she played the leading role in the Groupov's play "Rwanda 94". Her uncle, Jean-Marie Muyango, one the greatest Rwandan traditional musician, composed some score for the show.

In 2005, Carole Karemera played the main role alongside Idris Elba in Raoul Peck's film Sometimes in April, about the 1994 genocide against the Tutsi. The same year, she decided to settle in Kigali. Upon moving to the country, Carole Karemera became involved in cultural projects, including the first mobile library in Rwanda, the first Rwandan performing arts centre in Kigali/ISHYO, the Espace Madiba (library dedicated to African and Caribbean Literature) staged interactive plays in bars and in the streets of Rwandan cities, in order to develop new audience and communities for the arts. In 2007, Carole Karemera and seven other women established the Ishyo Arts Center in Kigali to support arts and culture's development in Rwanda.

ISHYO Arts Centre is today one of the leading organisation in the arts sector and creative hub in Kigali. Ishyo produces and coproduces four festivals including KINA (for young audience), Home Sweet Home, Kuya Kwetu and Rencontres Internationales du Livre Francophone du Rwanda. Together with Cécilia Kankonda, she created an installation "The cathedral of sounds" composed with four generations of music artists and built from recordings of memories in which participants could tell their memories of Rwanda before and during the 1994 genocide against the Tutsi.

In 2007, Carole Karemera also starred as Beatrice in the 2007 film Juju Factory. She received the Best Actress award at the Festival Cinema Africano in Italy. She directed the play "Murs-murs", about the transmission of violence between women.

Since 2009, Carole Karemera is involved in theater for young audience's development in the Great Lakes region. She co-coordinates Small citizens project aiming at training and supporting TYA's development and productions in Rwanda, Burundi, DRC, Kenya and Uganda. She co-directed "Les enfants d'Amazi" with Le théâtre du Papyrus and Full-Fun, "Our house" & "Taking about silence" with Helios theater.

She is also the co-founder and coordinator of Assitej Rwanda, member of Assitej International. In 2024, she has been selected to be part of IETM Global Connectors.

Since 2020, ISHYO is co-leading the project "KESHO - le monde d'après?" with le Théâtre de la Poudrerie, a project dedicated to ecology and participatory arts, taking place in Rwanda and France.

Karemera has served as Board Director at the African World Heritage Fund, as Deputy Secretary General of Arterial Network, as well as the Arterial Network Country Representative in Rwanda. She starred in Peter Brook's 2016 play Battlefield, based on The Mahabharata. In 2018, she received an award at the Les Journées théâtrales de Carthage, honoring her work in the theatre in Rwanda and Africa.

== Filmography ==
- 2005: Sometimes in April as Jeanne
- 2006: Sounds of Sand as Mouna
- 2007: Juju Factory as Béatrice
