= Émil Abossolo-Mbo =

Cameroonian-French actor (born 1958)

Emil Abossolo M'Bo
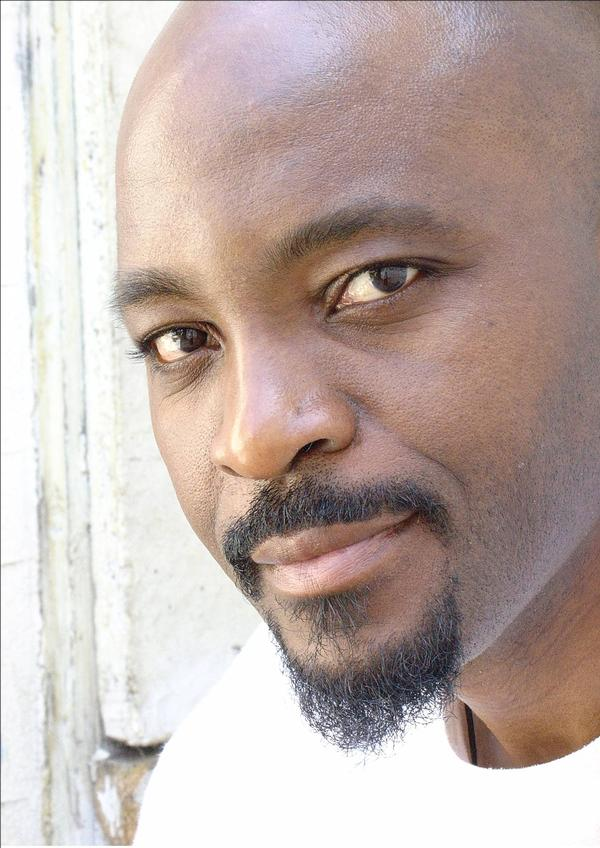
- Born: 29 August 1958 (age 67); Yaoundé, Cameroon
- Occupation: Actor
- Years active: 1984–present
- Children: 1

Emil Abossolo M'Bo (born 29 August 1958) is a Cameroonian-French actor who has portrayed in French, African and American productions. He is known in particular for his roles in Workers for the Good Lord, Africa Paradis and in the French series Plus belle la vie.

== Early and personal life ==
Abossolo was born on 29 August 1958 in Yaoundé, the capital city of Cameroon. His father took him to the movie theatre when he was 6 years old. Since that day acting has been his passion. Abossolo has been living in France for over twenty years now. He has a son named Akeva.

== Career ==
Abossolo is a multi–lingual actor. He speaks five languages (English, French, Spanish, Portuguese and his native language Beti). His career started on stage, where he played Hamlet, Titus Andronicus and La Tragédie du Roi Christophe. He starred in several French television shows such as La Brigade des Mineurs and Plus Belle la Vie. Internationally he is mostly known for his appearances in the television show Highlander: The Series, Queen of Swords, and The Young Indiana Jones Chronicles. More recently, Emil has been playing in African productions. He played in Ezra, the movie that received the 2007 Stallion of Yennenga at the Panafrican Film and Television Festival of Ouagadougou in Burkina Faso, West Africa.

== Theater ==
Year	Title	Author	Director	Notes
1995	Le Retour au désert	Bernard–Marie Koltès	Jacques Nichet	Opéra national de Montpellier

== Filmography ==
Year	Title	Role	Director	Notes
1984	Greystoke: The Legend of Tarzan, Lord of the Apes	Primate	Hugh Hudson	
1987	Cinéma 16	A musician	Alain Dhouailly	TV series (1 episode)
1989	Mama, There's a Man in Your Bed	Husband 2	Coline Serreau	
1990	In the Eye of the Snake	Bruce	Max Reid	
1991	Night on Earth	Passenger	Jim Jarmusch	
1991	Cauchemar Blanc	The black	Mathieu Kassovitz	Short
1992	The Young Indiana Jones Chronicles	Joseph	Simon Wincer & Carl Schultz	TV series (1 episode)
1993	La joie de vivre	Arsène	Roger Guillot	
1993	Un Pygmée dans la baignoire	The Midgets	Léandre-Alain Baker	Short
1994	Highlander: The Series	Luther	Paolo Barzman	TV series (1 episode)
1995	Comment épouser un héritage ?	The director	Patrice Ambard	TV movie
1996	Tout doit disparaître	Théo	Jean-Marc Moutout	Short
1996	Navarro	The Togolese	Patrick Jamain	TV series (1 episode)
1997	Ma 6-T va crack-er	The gym teacher	Jean-François Richet	
1997	La soupe	The man	Antoine Santana	Short
1997	Les arnaqueuses	Barnabé	Thierry Binisti	TV movie
1997	Highlander: The Series	Jocko	Dennis Berry	TV series (1 episode)
1997	P.J.	Mamadou	Gérard Vergez	TV series (2 episodes)
1998	Madeline	Circus Barker	Daisy von Scherler Mayer	
1998	Passion interdite	The theater teacher	Thierry Binisti (2)	TV movie
1998	Marie Fransson	René	Jean-Pierre Prévost	TV series (1 episode)
2000	Les Savates du bon Dieu	Maguette	Jean-Claude Brisseau	
2000	La mule		Jean-Stéphane Sauvaire	Short
2000	Oncle Paul	Omar	Gérard Vergez (2)	TV movie
2001	Paris: XY	Kalala Wa Kalala	Zeka Laplaine	
2001	Les morsures de l'aube	Baptiste	Antoine de Caunes	
2001	L'afrance	Guest artist	Alain Gomis	
2001	Le bal des pantins		Herman Van Eyken	
2001	L'aîné des Ferchaux	African reception	Bernard Stora	TV movie
2001	Queen of Swords	Lamorena	Paolo Barzman (2)	TV series (1 episode)
2002	Funeral		Newton Aduaka	Short
2002	Brigade des mineurs	The prosecutor	Miguel Courtois	TV series (1 episode)
2003	Clandestin	The voice	Philippe Larue	Short
2003	Mister Bird		Fabien Dufils	Short
2004	Casablanca Driver	The cop	Maurice Barthélemy	
2004	Bien agités !	Marabou	Patrick Chesnais	TV movie
2005	Les Saignantes	Minister of State	Jean-Pierre Bekolo	
2005	Kirikou and the Wild Beasts	The uncle	Bénédicte Galup & Michel Ocelot	Voice
2005	L'évangile selon Aîmé	The uncle	André Chandelle	TV movie
2005	Père et maire	Parlaban	Gilles Béhat	TV series (1 episode)
2005–08	Plus belle la vie	Damien Mara	Christophe Andrei, Roger Wielgus, ...	TV series (59 episodes)
2006	Sounds of Sand	Lassong	Marion Hänsel	
2006	Africa Paradis	Yokossi	Sylvestre Amoussou	
2007	Hitman	General Ajunwa	Xavier Gens	
2007	Juju Factory		Balufu Bakupa-Kanyinda	
2007	Ezra		Newton Aduaka (2)	
2007	Les Bleus	Professor Hassan	Didier Le Pêcheur	TV series (1 episode)
2007	Les prédateurs	Sassou N'Guesso	Lucas Belvaux	TV series (2 episodes)
2009	À domicile	The father	Bojina Panayotova	Short
2009	The Director, the Officer, and the Immigrant	Emile	David Louis Zuckerman	Short
2009	Adresse inconnue	Ghislain Marie	Alain Wermus	TV series (1 episode)
2010	A Screaming Man	The district chief	Mahamat Saleh Haroun	Philadelphia Film Festival – Best Actor
2010	Kennedy's Brain	Nuno Da Silva	Urs Egger	TV movie
2010	Kali	M. Jacobb	Richard Johnson	TV series (1 episode)
2011	Qui sème le vent	Aboubacar	Frédéric Garson	TV movie
2012	One Man's Show	Emil	Newton Aduaka (3)	
2013	Aya of Yop City	Kossi / Dieudonné / Gervais	Marguerite Abouet & Clément Oubrerie	Voices
2013	Aimé malgré lui	Kazadi Roger	Didier Ndenga	TV series (1 episode)
2014	1001 Grams	Observer	Bent Hamer	
2014	Intime conviction	Momo	Rémy Burkel	TV movie
2015	Une famille formidable	Ghislain Beaumont	Joël Santoni	TV series (1 episode)
