= Bye Bye Blondie =

- Film poster
- Directed by: Virginie Despentes
- Produced by: Cedric Walter; Sebastien de Fonseca; Jean-Yves Roubin; Ruth Waldburger
- Starring: Emmanuelle Béart; Béatrice Dalle
- Cinematography: Hélène Louvart
- Edited by: Martine Giordano
- Music by: Varou Jan
- Distributed by: Wild Bunch
- Release dates: 2011 (Festival du film gay et lesbien); 21 March 2012 (France)
- Running time: 87 minutes
- Country: France
- Language: French

Bye Bye Blondie is a 2011 French comedy film directed by Virginie Despentes.

== Cast ==
- Emmanuelle Béart as Frances
- Clara Ponsot as Young Frances
- Béatrice Dalle as Gloria
- Soko as Young Gloria
- Pascal Greggory as Claude
- Stomy Bugsy as Frances's driver
- Sasha Andres as Véro
- Jean-Marc Royon as Michel
- Olivia Csiky Trnka as Hélène
- Mata Gabin as The maid
- Nina Roberts as The coach
- Camille Chamoux as Tonina
- Alban Lenoir as Cop

== Production ==
Principal photography began on 28 June 2010 and was scheduled to last eight weeks, taking place in Paris, Nancy and Liège.

== Reception ==
Boyd van Hoeij of Variety called Bye Bye Blondie "punk and pouty" adding that "[the film] casts luscious-lipped Gallic sexpots Beatrice Dalle and Emmanuelle Beart as middle-aged lovers who can't seem to live with or without each other".

Simon Foster of SBS wrote "Lesbian love affair a little light on depth".
