= Juju Factory =

- Directed by: Balufu Bakupa-Kanyinda
- Screenplay by: Balufu Bakupa-Kanyinda
- Produced by: Dipanda Yo!
- Starring: Dieudonné Kabongo; Carole Karemera; Donatien Katik Bakomba; Aline Bosuma; Emil Abossolo-Mbo
- Cinematography: Olivier Pulinckx
- Edited by: Didier Ranz
- Music by: So Kalmery
- Release date: 2007
- Running time: 97 minutes
- Country: Democratic Republic of the Congo

Juju Factory is a 2007 film.

== Synopsis ==
Kongo lives in Brussels, in the Matongé district on which he is writing a book. His editor wants a kind of traveler's book spiced with ethnic ingredients. However, the writer is inspired by the vision of the complex and tormented souls that he meets everywhere, night and day. Kongo Congo follows invisible threads connected to Congolese history and its ghosts. How is it possible to hold on in this chaotic history? By having juju, self-confidence, and Beatrice's love.

== Awards ==
- Innsbruck 2007
- Zanzíbar 2007
- Kenya 2007
- Pays d’APT 2007
- Écrans Noirs Cameroun 2008

Carole Karemera won Best Actress at Bari 2007, and Dieudonne Kabongo Bashila won Best Actor at Écrans Noirs 2008.
