= The Amish (film) =

- Written by: David Belton
- Directed by: David Belton
- Theme music composer: Saunder Jurriaans and Daniel Bensi
- Country of origin: United States
- Original language: English

Production
- Producer: Callie T. Wiser
- Cinematography: Tim Cragg
- Editor: Chyld King
- Running time: 112 minutes

Original release
- Network: PBS
- Release: February 27, 2012

The Amish is a 2012 documentary film created by PBS as an episode (Season 24, Episode 5) of American Experience. The documentary, as the title implies, is centered on the Amish. It was uploaded on the PBS website in February 2012. Topics in the video range from the Ordnung to the Nickel Mines shooting to Rumspringa. The documentary was written and directed by David Belton. The documentary includes interviews of current and former Amish. A companion book was released in 2013.
