= Stefan Steć =

United Nations peacekeeper (1964–2005)

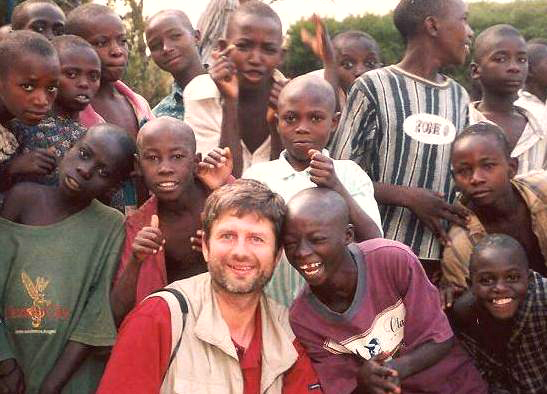
- Stefan Steć along with street children in Ndera (Kigali, Rwanda)
- Born: November 11, 1964; Warsaw, Poland
- Died: September 29, 2005 (aged 40); The Hague, Netherlands
- Military career
- Rank: Major
- Units: UNTAC, UNAMIR
- Awards: Cross of Merit for Bravery

Stefan Steć (11 November 1964 in Warsaw – 29 September 2005 in The Hague) was a major of the Polish Armed Forces. In 1994, he served as a peacekeeper in the UNAMIR forces in Rwanda under general Roméo Dallaire. For his dedication in saving lives during Rwandan genocide at the risk to his own, he was awarded the Cross of Merit for Bravery by Polish President Lech Wałęsa. He died at the age of 40 due to complications from posttraumatic stress disorder.

== Youth and service in UNTAC ==
Stefan Steć began his studies in 1982 at the Warsaw Military University of Technology, but then volunteered for service in Polish peacekeeping UN forces and completed training at the Polish peacekeeping centre in Kielce-Bukówka.

On his first UN mission he was assigned in 1992 to UNTAC forces at Phnom Penh, the capital of Cambodia. The goal of the mission was to supervise the first Cambodia parliamentary election. Poland provided a contingent in the size of the battalion containing engineering and logistic units repairing roads and bridges and providing operational units with water, food and fuel. The mission ended in September 1993.

== Service in UNAMIR during the Rwandan genocide ==
His next mission was small and ill-equipped UNAMIR-1 mission intended to oversee a transition from dictatorship to democracy in Rwanda and described by optimistic politicians as "classic". Only five Polish officers and cadets, mostly from finished UNTAC mission in Cambodia served in the UNAMIR mission that lasted from October 1993 till March 1996. They arrived in Kigali in November and December 1993 and their task was to prepare plans and organization of logistic support for the UNAMIR-1.

Upon arrival Steć noticed however that the other UN soldiers referred to the mission as a "Mission Impossible" due to the racism, the Hutu Power militia and the human rights abuses. "It felt as though we were sitting on a barrel of gunpowder, waiting for a spark. (...) genocide hung in the air", and "the international community was playing for time, waiting for some final solution to the Rwandan problem". But no one could ever have imagined the scale of what was to come.

When the genocide in Rwanda began on April 6, 1994, Steć was one of the first UN officers (with Polish Major Marek Pazik, Canadian Major Brent Beardsley and a three-man Bangladesh crew) who, called upon by two other Polish UNAMIR officers, Majors Jerzy Mączka and Ryszard Chudy, arrived by Czech armoured personnel carrier to the location of a massacre in Gikondo, the first discovered by UNAMIR. Steć filmed the bodies with his camcorder in order to secure the proof of a possible genocide and was the first UNAMIR officer to use this word. As noted later "we were explicitly forbidden to use the word genocide in our correspondence to New York".

Massacres like the one in Gikondo would become commonplace. "We had a well-organised genocide rolling through the country".

There were an estimated 10,000 people being killed each day by Interahamwe. Steć and fellow Polish officer Marek Pazik were assigned by Force Commander, BGen General Romeo Dallaire, with setting up a Humanitarian Assistance Cell to co-ordinate and organize rescue teams to save Tutsi under threat from extremists. By April 15, 1994 they had devised a plan for the creation of secure zones and an initial plan for co-ordinating relief supplies from UN and NGO agencies still operating in the country as well as a plan for protecting vulnerable Rwandans. Their initial efforts in this regard were handed over to Colonel Clayton Yaache of Ghana who had been assigned by General Romeo Dallaire to formally establish and command the UNAMIR-1 Humanitarian Assistance Cell (HAC) which by this time consisted of Steć, Pazik two recently deployed Canadian majors Luc-Andre Racine and Donny MacNeil. Unfortunately, the plans developed by Stec and Pazik could not entirely implemented due to concerns on implementation by the UN Security Council, or more specifically Paris, London, Washington, D.C., and Brussels. "Instead of saving people, UNAMIR was tasked with pursuing the near impossible task of getting the Rwandan Government and the Rwandan Patriotic Front, who had crossed the demilitarized zone en masse to intervene on behalf of the threatened Tutsi population, to agree to a cease fire amidst the carnage of killings that were taking place throughout the country and genocidal announcements being broadcast by the Government controlled Radio Rwanda". Essentially, it sounded to Stec that UNAMIR was to "not save people, but rather play for time and see how things developed". HAC had selected some 91 secure zones in Rwanda, but with the departure from theatre of the Belgian and Bangladesh contingents, there were only enough UNAMIR soldiers to provide security at only five locales in Kigali; The Hotel des Milles Collines, the Meridian Hotel, the King Faycal Hospital manned by UNAMIR's Tunisian company, and the Amahoro Stadium, manned by UNAMIR's Ghanaian battalion. In addition, a number of Tutsi sought refuge at the UNAMIR Headquarters at the Amahoro Hotel. In addition, the Force Commander had tasked his UN Military Observers (MILOBs) with monitoring the security situation at the Sainte-Famille Church, which at the time was being somewhat secured by the Rwandan Gendarmarie and where a large number of Tutsi had sought safety. The remainder of UNAMIRs troops were tasked with securing the Kigali Airport to ensure evacuations and air delivery of humanitarian aid.

In early May 1994 Colonel Yaache was tasked with organizing and leading an evacuation of particularly vulnerable Rwandans from the Hotel des Milles Collines who had been guaranteed asylum by a number of European countries. Steć, Pazik and Major Donny MacNeil participated in this operation along with a protection force made up of a section of Tunisian peacekeepers. "I had a 'Schindler's List' of the people we were allowed to save". MacNeil and Stec found themselves reading the names of the chosen few in the crowded hotel lobby. The conditions for selection were that they had been granted a visa, and their sponsors could guarantee their financial support. Although the operation was approved by the leadership of the Rwandan military, the evacuation attempt was unsuccessful, with the convoy being split and halted by Rwandan military and Interahamwe. Following a very tense standoff at the roadblock, through tense negotiation, Yaache and MacNeil managed to prevent the evacuees from being killed and persuaded the Rwandan leadership to have the evacuees returned safely to the Hotel des Milles Collines. While there was no loss of life, a number of the evacuees had been assaulted by the Rwandan troops and Interahamwe. At this point, it became evident to the Force Commander and the soldiers of UNAMIR that the Rwandan military and Gendarmarie leadership were not able to control the population and in particular the Interahamwe. A few blocks away from the Hotel Mille Collines, there was a church, l' Eglise St. Famille harboring more than 5000 refugees, where nightly, Interahamwe, under the nose of the Gendarmarie stationed there, were dragging away victims for killing. Without visas, they could not be evacuated out of country, however the presence of UN MILOB patrols reduced significantly the violence and later the UHAC was successful in the evacuation of those in peril to the RPF controlled area.

Later in May 1994, Steć and his colleagues, together with Colonel Yaache and General Dallaire, concluded that the establishment of safe zones could still be done and concluded that it was the right thing to do but once again the political support was not there despite the continued failure to obtain a ceasefire and the continuing massacres occurring within the country. Despite this setback, the HAC, in addition to supporting UN and NGO with the safe delivery of humanitarian supplies, revived a plan to safely evacuate Hutus who had sought protection within the RPF zone and Tutsi who had sought refuge in the Government controlled zone. After formal meetings with the Government and RPF leadership, an agreement was formalized whereby an equal number of evacuees could be exchanged by UN convoy across front lines. Despite the RPF firing randomly at times on the convoys, during the month of June 1994, NAMIRIR Ghanaian troops successfully evacuated some 2000 Rwandans in peril across the front lines to safety. These convoys became more and more difficult depending on the tactical situation of the opposing sides. It became evident that the operation was becoming ineffective as the RPF advanced and put safe areas in the government zone in peril. "At that time, a sense of rebellion was emerging within UNAMIR; whispers of a nonsense operation were heard among military observers to describe the refugee transfers we did". It was then Steć considered deserting UNAMIR and joining the Rwandan Patriotic Front in protest. But still he had the list of people that were allowed to be saved and actually were.

When the United Nations Security Council, at the instigation of the United Kingdom, had determined that UNAMIR be withdrawn, leaving only a "token force" to "appease public opinion", Steć remained in Rwanda even though the council terminated sending supplies to the remaining peacekeepers.

== Amahoro Foundation and death ==
After the genocide was over in July 1994 Steć left UNAMIR and made a home with his partner Heather Kilner in The Hague. Working in computer technology, he saved enough money to establish in December 2001, along with Kilner, the Amahoro Foundation. Since then the foundation has assisted children, particularly orphans, with advanced education and relief from poverty in Rwanda, connecting people of goodwill, generally supported only by a website designed by Stec. In Kinyarwanda, amahoro means peace.

For his exceptional courage in Rwanda, saving lives at the risk to his own, he was personally thanked by the Polish President Lech Wałęsa, who honored him with the Cross of Merit for Bravery. Steć dedicated this cross to all volunteers who stayed with UNAMIR and especially to General Dallaire, "whose courage and leadership kept us going despite the lack of support from the international community".

In 2005, Steć was invited to a special showing of Hotel Rwanda in The Hague. After the film, which portrays the peacekeepers as ineffectual, there was a panel discussion during which Steć was publicly blamed for not having done enough to save Rwandan lives. Subsequently, Steć fell ill after the viewing. He stopped eating despite intervention by psychiatrists who had treated soldiers from the Dutch UN battalion in Srebrenica, and subsequently died due to complications from post traumatic stress disorder in September 2005.

In the 2007 Canadian drama feature film Shake Hands with the Devil, Steć is played by Mark Antony Krupa.
