= Workers for the Good Lord =

2000 film by Jean-Claude Brisseau

- Theatrical release poster
- French: Les Savates du bon Dieu
- Directed by: Jean-Claude Brisseau
- Written by: Jean-Claude Brisseau
- Produced by: Corinne Bertelot
- Starring: Stanislas Merhar; Raphaële Godin; Emil Abossolo-Mbo; Paulette Dubost; Coralie Revel
- Cinematography: Romain Winding; Laurent Fleutot
- Edited by: María Luisa García Martinez
- Music by: Jean Musy
- Production companies: Euripide Productions; La Sorcière Rouge
- Distributed by: Rezo Films
- Release date: 8 March 2000 (France)
- Running time: 107 minutes
- Country: France
- Language: French

Workers for the Good Lord (French: Les Savates du bon Dieu) is a 2000 French crime comedy-drama film written and directed by Jean-Claude Brisseau, starring Stanislas Merhar, Raphaële Godin, Emil Abossolo-Mbo, Paulette Dubost and Coralie Revel. The film was chosen by Cahiers du Cinéma as one of the 10 best pictures of 2000.

== Plot ==
Elodie, tired of her husband Fred's generous ways, endangering the family's finances, dumps him when he gets fired. Emotionally devastated, he turns into a modern Robin Hood, robbing a post office to help a beggar, and escapes in a stolen car with Sandrine, who has long had a crush on him. They meet Maguette, an African prince turned into a penniless exile. Together the three head south.

== Cast ==
- Stanislas Merhar as Fred
- Raphaële Godin as Sandrine
- Emil Abossolo-Mbo as Maguette
- Coralie Revel as Elodie
- Paulette Dubost as grandmother
- Philippe Caroit as Jacques
- Christian Pernet as mechanic
- Romain R'Bibo as Miguel
- Samir Fouzari as Marouf
- Abder-Kader Dahou as Kamel
- Albert Montias as Mangin
- Fabienne Poncet as postmaster
- Aurélie Sterling as Nina

== Production ==
The film was shot in 1998 in the Loire in Saint-Étienne, Montbrison and its surroundings, and in the Drôme department.

== Critical reception ==
Lisa Nesselson of Variety described the film as "a radical genre pastiche", "over the top", "extravagantly lensed, socio-romantic experiment" adding, "It's so bad it's good."
