= Moonshine Whiskey =

Song by Van Morrison

from the album Tupelo Honey
- Released: October 1971
- Recorded: Spring 1971
- Studio: Wally Heider, San Francisco
- Genre: Country rock, soul
- Length: 6:48
- Label: Warner Bros.
- Songwriter: Van Morrison
- Producers: Van Morrison; Ted Templeman

"Moonshine Whiskey" is a song written by singer-songwriter Van Morrison and is the concluding track of his 1971 album Tupelo Honey.

It was a popular tune with Morrison in the 1970s and he regularly performed it in concert. Brian Hinton writes that Morrison later admitted that he had written this song "for Janis Joplin or something" but goes on to say "though it is not autobiographical in the same way as Leonard Cohen's 'Chelsea Hotel Number Two'".

In Tupelo Honey's Rolling Stone review Jon Landau says the song "is a joyful statement about the existence and continuation of love and the stability it offers."

The song contains references to trains, railroads and the countryside, themes that Morrison has returned to throughout his career, as well as subjects country blues artists Jimmie Rodgers and Hank Williams often used.

In 2017 "Moonshine Whiskey" came at number three in The Telegraph's "The 30 best songs about whiskey".

== Music ==
The song contains the two main genres Morrison used on Tupelo Honey: country rock and soul. The introduction features both electric and steel guitars, in what Allmusic reviewer Tom Maginnis calls "a halting country vamp". The song changes tempo many times in its 6 1/2-minute duration, changing from a fast 4/4 time to a slow 6/8 sauteuse waltz and back to 4/4 time on various occasions. Morrison uses this form of distinct movements within songs later in his career, most prominently on "Summertime in England" off the 1980 album Common One. Tom Maginnis concludes that at the end of the song "the arrangement kicks into a full-scale gospel rave-up complete with call and response backing vocal, group handclaps, pumping piano, and blaring horns all at breakneck speeds before pulling up to a slamming halt."

== Filmed performances ==
- The song was included in the 1974 broadcast of Morrison's 23 July 1973, performance at the Rainbow Theatre, London that featured The Caledonia Soul Orchestra.
- "Moonshine Whiskey" is also one of the songs performed in 1979, on Morrison's first video Van Morrison in Ireland, released in 1981.
- There is black-and-white footage of Morrison performing "Moonshine Whiskey" at Passaic, New Jersey in 1979.

== Personnel ==
- Van Morrison – acoustic guitar, vocals
- Ronnie Montrose – electric guitar, mandolin
- Bill Church – bass
- Luis Gasca – trumpet
- Mark Jordan – piano
- Gary Mallaber – percussion
- John McFee – pedal steel guitar
- Janet Planet – background vocals
- Rick Shlosser – drums
- Ellen Schroer – background vocals
- Jack Schroer – alto saxophone
