= Sounds of Sand =

2006 drama film directed by Marion Hänsel

Sounds of Sand (original title Si le vent soulève les sables, literally "If the Wind Raises the Sands") is a drama film directed by Marion Hänsel about a family in the Horn of Africa making a trek to find sufficient water during a drought. The film is a Belgium-France coproduction, released in 2006. It is based on the novel Chamelle (ISBN 2709623889) by Marc Durin-Valois.

== Cast ==
- Isaka Sawadogo as Rahne
- Carole Karemera as Mouna
- Asma Nouman Aden as Shasha
- Emile Abossolo M'Bo as Lassong

== Production ==
The film was shot in Djibouti.
