= Shooting Dogs =

- Promotional movie poster
- Directed by: Michael Caton-Jones
- Screenplay by: David Wolstencroft
- Story by: Richard Alwyn; David Belton
- Produced by: David Belton; Pippa Cross; Jens Meurer
- Starring: John Hurt; Hugh Dancy; Clare-Hope Ashitey
- Cinematography: Ivan Strasburg
- Edited by: Christian Lonk
- Music by: Dario Marianelli
- Production companies: Adirondack Pictures; BBC Film; UK Film Council; Invicta Capital; Filmstiftung NRW; Crossday Productions; Egoli Tossell Films
- Distributed by: IFC Films (United States); Metrodome Distribution (United Kingdom)
- Release dates: 11 September 2005 (Toronto International Film Festival); 31 March 2006 (United Kingdom)
- Running time: 115 minutes
- Countries: United Kingdom; Germany
- Languages: English; French

Shooting Dogs, released in the United States as Beyond the Gates, is a 2005 film directed by Michael Caton-Jones and starring John Hurt, Hugh Dancy and Clare-Hope Ashitey. It is based on the experiences of BBC news producer David Belton, who worked in Rwanda during the Rwandan genocide. Belton is the film's co-writer and one of its producers.

The setting of the film is the École Technique Officielle (ETO) in Kigali, Rwanda, in 1994, during the Rwandan genocide. Hurt plays a Catholic priest (loosely based on Vjekoslav Ćurić) and Dancy an English teacher, both Europeans, who are caught up in the events of the genocide.

Unlike Hotel Rwanda, which was filmed in South Africa using South African actors, the film was shot in the original location of the scenes it portrays. Also, many of the massacre survivors were employed as part of the production crew and in minor acting roles.

The film's title refers to the actions of UN soldiers in shooting at the stray dogs that scavenged the bodies of the dead. Since the UN soldiers were not allowed to shoot at the Hutu extremists who had caused the deaths in the first place, the shooting of dogs is symbolic of the madness of the situation that the film attempts to capture.

== Plot ==
Joe Connor is a teacher at the École Technique Officielle outside Kigali, run by Father Christopher. The school is also home to a company of Belgian soldiers under the command of Captain Delon, as part of the UN peacekeeping mandate. Joe is close to a girl, Marie, who, Christopher believes, has a crush on him. In early April 1994, they observe a number of events that cause Christopher some concern, including lists being made of Tutsi families, reports of Hutu mobs attacking Tutsis elsewhere in the country, and a suspicious interest shown by Christopher's government contact in the number of UN troops at the school.

On the night of 6 April 1994, distant explosions and gunshots are heard, and Delon hears that the President's plane has been shot down. He mobilises his men to guard the school perimeter, turning it into a military base. Refugees arrive at the gates, and Christopher, over Delon's objections, insists that they are let in. The next morning, Joe drives to Marie's house to fetch her, but the house is deserted save for a dog. He returns to the school to find that she has arrived through the rear entrance, as the front entrance is now guarded by a Hutu mob. The refugees organise themselves under the leadership of Roland, Marie's father. A number of European refugees also arrive, and, to Christopher's frustration, Delon arranges for them to be given better quarters. Christopher continues with church services as usual, while Joe attempts to help the refugees.

As a mob surrounds the school, Joe thinks it would help the refugees if their plight is televised and requests Delon's assistance to fetch BBC journalist Rachel and bring her to the compound. Delon is initially cooperative, but abruptly changes his mind and refuses when he hears that the Belgian soldiers guarding Prime Minister Uwilingiyimana have been massacred. Joe decides to leave anyway and get his friend François, who is a Hutu, to escort him instead, but François is not at home. Joe finds Rachel and her cameraman and persuades them to come to the school by telling them there are Europeans there. As they are returning to the school they are stopped at a roadblock and dragged from their vehicle at gunpoint. While Rachel tries to negotiate their way out, Joe is distraught to see a Tutsi man dragged off and hacked to death with machetes. He is further horrified to see that François is with the mob, holding a bloody machete. François arranges for Joe and the BBC team to be let through. The journalists seem much more dispassionate about the events than Joe, which he later discusses with Rachel, who is a veteran reporter with experience of similar events in Bosnia.

During an interview with Delon, Rachel asks him why his troops do not intervene to stop the killings and queries the UN mandate. Delon terminates the interview and tells her that he has requested a change to his mandate to allow him to intervene, without success. Christopher delivers the baby of Edda, one of the refugees, who names the baby after him. Christopher later leaves the school to find medicine for the baby and to visit a nearby convent, which he has heard has been attacked. At the pharmacist, he pays a bribe to get the medicine and angrily lies that the child is Hutu. When he arrives at the convent, he finds that the nuns have all been killed. Outside, the school's hurdles which he lent out as a favour are being used as part of the roadblock, something his government contact gleefully points out. On Christopher's return to the school, Delon tells him they will begin shooting the dogs scavenging nearby bodies. Christopher sarcastically asks if the dogs have been shooting at the UN troops, in reference to their limited mandate.

French troops arrive at the base but announce they are only there to take French refugees. After a furious outburst from Delon, they agree to take all the Europeans. Joe attempts to negotiate for Marie to take his place on the trucks but is rebuffed. Rachel leaves with the French, telling Joe he should leave too. A group of refugees, including Edda, try to escape through the rear of the school but are ambushed by a mob. Most of them are killed, but a few make it back to the safety of the compound. Edda initially avoids them by hiding, but her baby begins crying, alerting the killers to her presence. As Joe watches, she and her baby are hacked to death.

Delon eventually receives orders to withdraw from the school. While the Belgians are preparing to leave, Roland begs Delon to shoot the refugees, to spare them murder by machete, but Delon refuses. Joe decides he cannot bear it anymore and leaves with Delon. He encounters Marie as he is boarding the truck and cannot say anything but "I'm sorry". Christopher elects to stay behind, before realising he can smuggle children out in the back of the school truck. He takes a small group of children, including Marie, intending to return for more, but as soon as he leaves the school, the mob attacks and massacres the remaining refugees.

Christopher is stopped at a roadblock, which is led by his friend Julius. Despite Christopher's attempts to talk his way through and appeal to their relationship, Julius is openly hostile. When Christopher refuses to cooperate, Julius fatally shoots him. Marie, observing their conversation and fearing that the truck will be searched, meanwhile manages to slip away unnoticed with the children. Christopher sees Marie escape before dying.

Footage of Marie running is intercut with interview footage over the UN's reluctance to term the events in Rwanda a "genocide". In a brief epilogue, Marie tracks down Joe, who is now a teacher at Christopher's old school, and they briefly discuss their experiences.

The film closes with information about the genocide in Rwanda and the killings at the ETO in particular, with details of the personal experiences of some of the film crew during the genocide.

== Cast (credited) ==
- John Hurt as Father Christopher
- Hugh Dancy as Joe Connor
- Dominique Horwitz as Capitaine Charles Delon
- Louis Mahoney as Sibomana
- Nicola Walker as Rachel
- Steve Toussaint as Roland
- David Gyasi as François
- Susan Nalwoga as Edda
- Victor Power as Julius
- Jack Pierce as Mark
- Musa Kasonka Jr. as Boniface
- Kizito Ssentamu Kayiira as Pierre
- Clare-Hope Ashitey as Marie

== Crew ==
- Director – Michael Caton-Jones
- Writers – David Wolstencroft (screenplay), Richard Alwyn (story), David Belton (story)
- Original Music – Dario Marianelli
- Cinematography – Ivan Strasburg
- Editing – Christian Lonk
- Casting – Anja Dihrberg, Karen Lindsay-Stewart
- Production Design – Bertram Strauß
- Art Direction – Astrid Sieben
- Set Decoration – Dagmar Wessel
- Costume Design – Dinah Collin

== Critical response ==
The review aggregator website Rotten Tomatoes reports an approval rating of 84% based on 63 reviews, with an average rating of 7.2/10. The website's critical consensus reads, "Complex, human characters and on-location shooting give Beyond the Gates palpable tension and urgency." In The Guardian critic Rob Mackey wrote: "If you didn't know the story, you might expect the film to develop into a nice little culture-clash comedy… Shooting Dogs boasts a real location: the school in Kigali where a nightmare played itself out." In The New Statesman Victoria Segal wrote: "Shooting Dogs was shot in Kigali and the geography plays a significant role in generating stark fear: the oddly deserted streets, the bodies in the undergrowth, the humidity and dust. It is full of prickling moments of evil…"

== Awards ==
1 win Heartland Film Festival 2006 Grand Prize for Dramatic Feature

== See also ==
- Hotel Rwanda, a 2004 film dealing with the genocide that centers on the Hôtel des Mille Collines, a location also seen in Sometimes in April.
- Shake Hands with the Devil, a 2007 film based on the book of the same name recounting General Dallaire's harrowing personal journey during the 1994 Rwandan Genocide and how the United Nations failed to heed Dallaire's urgent pleas for further assistance to halt the massacre
- Rwandan genocide
