= Michael Radford =

English film director and screenwriter (born 1946)

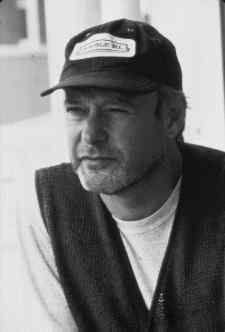
- Born: 24 February 1946 (age 80); New Delhi, British India
- Education: Worcester College; National Film and Television School
- Occupations: Film director, screenwriter, television writer
- Spouse(s): Iseult Teran (1990–1997); Emma Tweed (2006 –present)
- Children: 3
- Awards: 1996 BAFTA Award for Best Direction, Il Postino: The Postman; 1996 BAFTA Award for Best Film Not in the English Language, Il Postino: The Postman

Michael James Radford (born 24 February 1946) is an English film director and screenwriter. He began his career as a documentary director and television comedy writer before transitioning into features in the early 1980s.

His best-known credits include the 1984 film adaptation of George Orwell's Nineteen Eighty-Four starring John Hurt and Richard Burton (in his final role), the Shakespeare adaptation The Merchant of Venice, the true crime drama White Mischief, and the 1994 Italian-language comedy drama Il Postino: The Postman, for which he won the BAFTA Awards for Best Direction and Best Film Not in the English Language, and earned Academy Award nominations for Best Director and Best Adapted Screenplay.

== Early life and career ==
Radford was born on 24 February 1946, in New Delhi, India, to a British father and an Austrian Jewish mother. He was educated at Bedford School before attending Worcester College, Oxford. After teaching for a few years, he went to the National Film and Television School, becoming a student there in its inaugural year.

Between 1976 and 1982, Radford worked as a documentary film maker, mostly on projects for the BBC, covering subjects such as Scottish islanders on the Isle of Lewis in the Outer Hebrides who believe in the literal truth of the Bible: The Last Stronghold of the Pure Gospel; the soprano Isobel Buchanan: La Belle Isobel; the singer songwriter Van Morrison: Van Morrison in Ireland; and the self-explanatory The Making of The Pirates of Penzance. On the last two of these, Radford worked with the cinematographer Roger Deakins, who would later shoot two of Radford's feature films; Nineteen Eighty-Four and White Mischief. Another notable early work was Another Time, Another Place (1983), a feature film set in Scotland during World War II and centred on a love story between a local woman and an Italian POW.

== Career ==
Radford came to international attention with Nineteen Eighty-Four, his adaptation of George Orwell's novel 1984, starring John Hurt as Winston Smith, and in which Richard Burton gave his final film performance. The film was made in the time and place (London, April–June 1984) at which the book was set.

Radford's next film, released in 1987, was White Mischief, a period drama set in Kenya during the 1940s. Radford again wrote the screenplay, an adaptation of the novel by James Fox also called White Mischief.

Michael Radford is most widely known as the writer and director of the 1994 film Il Postino: The Postman, which Radford adapted from the novel Ardiente Paciencia by Antonio Skármeta. The massive international success of the film (for many years it was the largest grossing non-English language film ever made) led to international acclaim for Radford and the star of the film Massimo Troisi. Tragically, Troisi died, aged 41, the day after the filming of Il Postino was completed. The film won many international film awards including the 'Best Film Not in the English Language' BAFTA for Radford, who was also nominated for the Best Director and Adapted Screenplay Academy Awards.

In 2000, Radford's film Dancing at the Blue Iguana was released. In a departure from his more usual development technique, namely adapting novels, this film was largely improvised, although Radford shared the screenwriting credit with David Linter.

In 2004, Radford directed The Merchant of Venice (2004). He adapted the William Shakespeare play (see: Shakespearean comedies), and the film stars Al Pacino as Shylock and Jeremy Irons as Antonio. In 2007, he reunited Demi Moore and Michael Caine (who had already been together in 1984 for Blame it on Rio) in Flawless, a diamond heist story set in 1960. His most recent film is Elsa & Fred (2014), a romantic comedy starring Shirley MacLaine and Christopher Plummer.

Radford directed his first play in 2000, a West End production of The Seven Year Itch. This was an adaptation of Billy Wilder's 1955 film starring Marilyn Monroe.

== Personal life ==
Radford has a son, Felix (born 1991), from his first marriage to Iseult Teran. He also has a daughter, Amaryllis (born 2005), and a son, Linus (born 2010), with his current wife, Emma Tweed.

In addition to English (his first language), he speaks fluent Spanish, French, Italian, and some Mandarin.

In September 2013, he took part in the Clipper Round the World Sailing Race, in which he raced one of 12 identical 70-foot racing yachts from London to Rio.

== Filmography ==
=== Film ===
Year	Title	Director	Writer	Notes
1973	Concerning the Surface	Yes	Yes	NFTS student film
1974	Cold Night	Yes	Yes	NFTS student film
1983	Another Time, Another Place	Yes	Yes	Taormina Golden Charybdis; Nominated – David di Donatello for Best Foreign Film
1984	Nineteen Eighty-Four	Yes	Yes	Evening Standard British Film Award for Best Film; Istanbul Golden Tulip; Nominated – Fantasporto International Fantasy Film Award
1987	White Mischief	Yes	Yes	
1994	Il Postino: The Postman	Yes	Yes	BAFTA Award for Best Film Not in the English Language; BAFTA Award for Best Direction; Nominated – Academy Award for Best Director; Nominated – Academy Award for Best Adapted Screenplay; Nominated – BAFTA Award for Best Adapted Screenplay; Nominated – Directors Guild of America Award for Outstanding Directing – Feature Film
1998	B. Monkey	Yes	Yes	Replaced Michael Caton-Jones
2000	Dancing at the Blue Iguana	Yes	Yes	
2002	Ten Minutes Older: The Cello	Yes	Yes	Segment: "Addicted to the Stars"
2004	The Merchant of Venice	Yes	Yes	Nominated – David di Donatello for Best European Film
2007	Flawless	Yes	No	
2013	The Mule	Yes	Yes	Radford walked away and cut ties with the film in the wake of a litigation over its finances, renouncing to any credit in the cut released in 2013
2014	Elsa & Fred	Yes	Yes	
2017	The Music of Silence	Yes	Yes	

Documentary film

Year	Title	Director	Writer	Notes
1976	Sugar	Yes	No	
1978	Mountain Days	Yes	No	
1981	Van Morrison in Ireland	Yes	No	
1982	The Making of 'The Pirates of Penzance'	Yes	No	
2011	Michel Petrucciani	Yes	Yes	Nominated – César Award for Best Documentary Film

=== Television ===
Year	Title	Director	Writer	Notes
1979	Everyman	Yes	Yes	Episodes: "The Last Stronghold of the Pure Gospel" & "La Belle Isobel"
1979	Scotch and Wry	No	Yes	3 episodes
1976–77	Omnibus	Yes	No	Episodes: "Unita" & "The Madonna and the Volcano"
1980	The Two Ronnies	No	Yes	3 episodes
1981	A Kick Up the Eighties	No	Yes	5 episodes
1981	Three of a Kind	No	Yes	3 episodes
1981–82	Crackerjack!	No	Yes	10 episodes
1982	The Late, Late Breakfast Show	No	Yes	11 episodes
1996	Homicide: Life on the Street	Yes	No	Episode: "Justice: Part 1"

TV movies

Year	Title	Director	Writer
1980	The White Bird Passes	Yes	Yes
1982	La Belle Isobel	Yes	No

== Awards and nominations ==
Year	Association	Category	Work	Result
1983	Taormina Film Fest	Golden Charybdis	Another Time, Another Place	Won
1985	Fantasporto	International Fantasy Film Award	Nineteen Eighty-Four	Nominated
1985	International Istanbul Film Festival	Golden Tulip	Nineteen Eighty-Four	Won
1985	London Evening Standard	Best Film	Nineteen Eighty-Four	Won
1986	Accademia del Cinema Italiano	Best Foreign Film	Another Time, Another Place	Nominated
1995	Ciak	Best Film	Il Postino: The Postman	Won
1995	Rome Foreign Press Association	Best Film	Il Postino: The Postman	Nominated
1995	Los Angeles Film Critics Association	Best Foreign Language Film	Il Postino: The Postman	Nominated
1995	São Paulo International Film Festival	Best Feature	Il Postino: The Postman	Won
1996	Academy of Motion Picture Arts and Sciences	Best Director	Il Postino: The Postman	Nominated
1996	Academy of Motion Picture Arts and Sciences	Best Adapted Screenplay	Il Postino: The Postman	Nominated
1996	Norwegian International Film Festival	Best Foreign Feature Film	Il Postino: The Postman	Won
1996	London Film Critics' Circle	British Director of the Year	Il Postino: The Postman	Won
1996	British Academy of Film and Television Arts	Best Adapted Screenplay	Il Postino: The Postman	Nominated
1996	British Academy of Film and Television Arts	Best Direction	Il Postino: The Postman	Won
1996	British Academy of Film and Television Arts	Best Film Not in the English Language	Il Postino: The Postman	Won
1996	Argentine Film Critics Association	Best Foreign Film	Il Postino: The Postman	Won
1996	Directors Guild of America	Outstanding Directorial Achievements in Motion Pictures	Il Postino: The Postman	Nominated
1996	Radio Nacional de España	Best Foreign Film	Il Postino: The Postman	Won
1996	Radio Nacional de España	Rosa de Sant Jordi Audience Award	Il Postino: The Postman	Won
1997	Académie des Lumières	Best Foreign Film	Il Postino: The Postman	Won
1997	Danish Film Academy	Best Foreign Film	Il Postino: The Postman	Won
1997	Kinema Junpo	Best Foreign Language Film	Il Postino: The Postman	Won
2004	London Film Critics' Circle	British Director of the Year	The Merchant of Venice	Nominated
2005	Accademia del Cinema Italiano	Best European Film	The Merchant of Venice	Nominated
2012	Académie des Arts et Techniques du Cinéma	Best Documentary Film	Michel Petrucciani	Nominated
2014	Bari International Film Festival	Platinum Award for Cinematic Excellence	—N/a	Won
2014	Cinéfest Sudbury International Film Festival	International Audience Choice Award	Elsa & Fred	Won
2017	El Gouna Film Festival	Golden Star – Feature Narrative Competition	The Music of Silence	Nominated
2017	Montecarlo Film Festival	Career Award	—N/a	Won
