= (Straight to Your Heart) Like a Cannonball =

- Netherlands single cover

Single by Van Morrison

from the album Tupelo Honey
- B-side: "Old Old Woodstock"
- Released: 1972
- Genre: Country rock
- Length: 3:43
- Label: Warner Bros.
- Songwriter: Van Morrison
- Producers: Van Morrison, Ted Templeman

Van Morrison singles chronology
"Tupelo Honey" (1971)	"(Straight to Your Heart) Like a Cannonball" (1972)	"Jackie Wilson Said (I'm in Heaven When You Smile)" (1972)

"(Straight to Your Heart) Like a Cannonball" is a song written by Van Morrison that was first released on his 1971 album Tupelo Honey. It was also released as the third single from the album, but did not chart.

== Lyrics and music ==
The lyrics of "(Straight to Your Heart) Like a Cannonball" propose taking advantage of nature to solve one's problems. An example is the opening verse "Well you know sometimes it gets so hard/And everything does not seem to rhyme/I take a walk out in my backyard and go/Do do loo do do, do do loo, do do." The lyrics show country music influences with references to love, weather, and being outdoors. In reviewing Tupelo Honey, Rolling Stone critic Jon Landau suggested that "(Straight to Your Heart) Like a Cannonball" transmutes the expression of generalized need for excitement and fulfillment on the previous song and hit single "Wild, Wild Night" into an expression of desire for a single person."

The music is lively with a triple metre time signature. The feel of the music shows jazz and R&B influences. Los Angeles Times critic Robert Hilburn suggested that it was an "uptempo spirit." Producer Ted Templeman felt that Ronnie Montrose's electric guitar playing was particularly effective on this song, stating that his "infectious strumming and catchy fills made 'Cannonball' worthy of release as a single." Templeman also praised the 2-note hook Montrose played after the "Do do loo do do, do do loo, do do" line that ends most of the verses. Templeman felt that "it was a simple lick that any guitarist could have played but, the way he played it was special. It brightened the tune right up and gave it this pop sheen." Morrison played acoustic guitar on the song. Copley News Service critic Judy Hugg praised "Boots" Houston's flute playing on the song.

== Recording ==
"(Straight to Your Heart) Like a Cannonball" was recorded at Wally Heider Studios in San Francisco, California, during the first set of recording sessions for Tupelo Honey.

== Reception ==
Billboard chose "(Straight to Your Heart) Like a Cannonball" as a recommended pop single when the single was released. Nonetheless, "(Straight to Your Heart) Like a Cannonball" failed to make the Billboard Hot 100, topping out on the Bubbling Under Hot 100 chart at #119.

Record World called it a "superb cut" and said that this "smooth, rolling song highlighted by some great 'la-las' is a natural for just about every kind of music lover." Windsor Star critic John Laycock praised the "cheerful banality" of the song. The Dispatch critic Dink Lorance described it as a "bouncy little number with nice guitar and vocals." Patrick Humphries praised the song's "verve and panache." Music journalist Erik Hage described the song as "focused medicine-show Americana."
