= École Technique Officielle =

- Official Technical School

Location
- Rue de Kagarama; Kigali; Rwanda
- Coordinates: 1°58′50″S 30°06′24″E

Information
- Religious affiliation: Roman Catholic
- Status: Closed
- Closed: April 11, 1994
- Nickname: ETO
- Affiliation: Salesians of Don Bosco

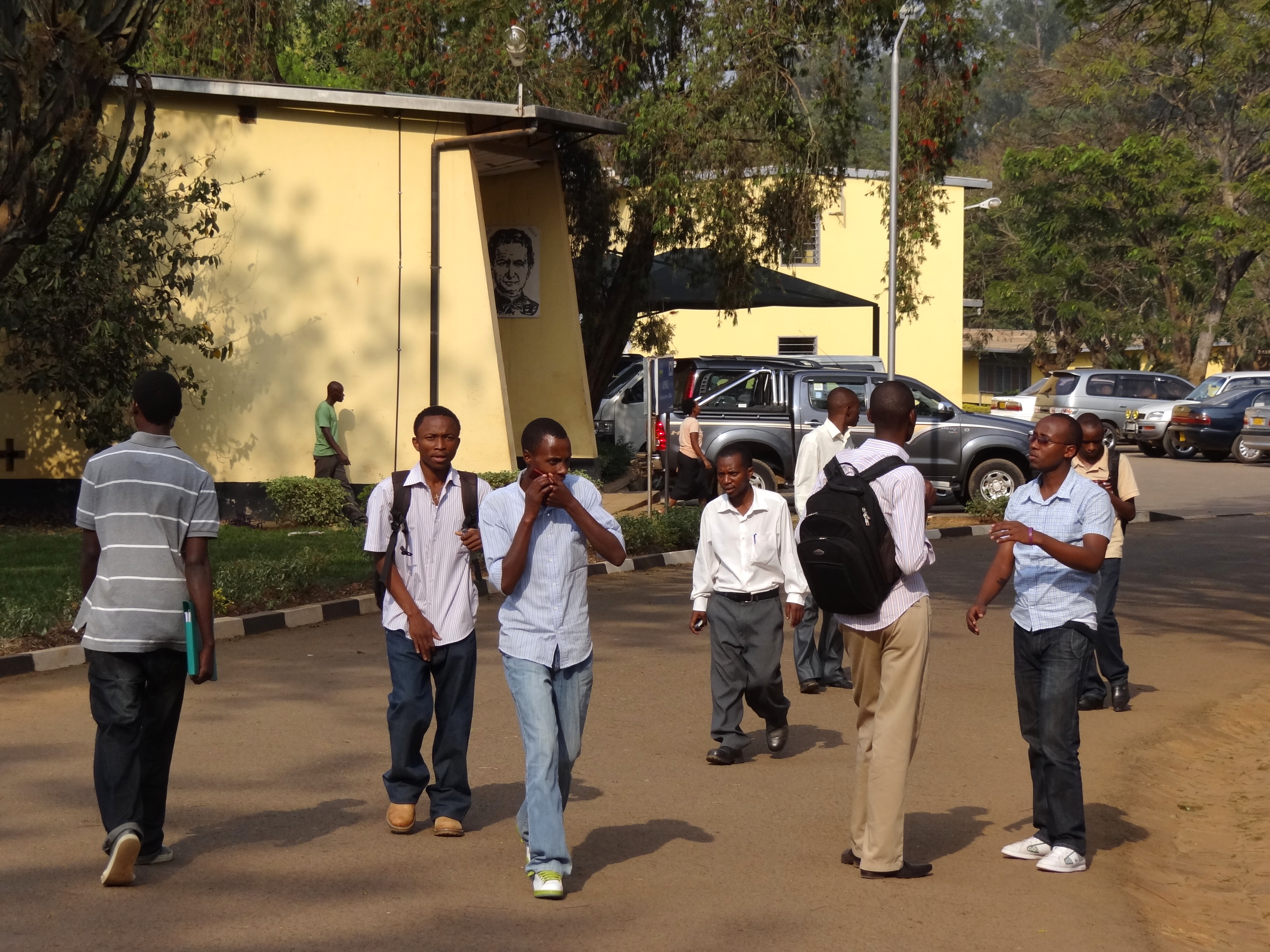
Students at Kicukiro Technical Training Center - Formerly the Ecole Technique Officielle - Where Belgian UN Peacekeepers Abandoned Tutsis to Their Fate - Kicukiro District - Kigali - Rwanda

The École Technique Officielle was a Salesian secondary school in Kigali, Rwanda. On April 11, 1994, during the Rwandan genocide, over 2,000 Rwandans were murdered by extremist militia.

This event is the subject of the movie Shooting Dogs (also called Beyond the Gates) by Michael Caton-Jones.
