= Tupelo Honey (song) =

Single by Van Morrison

from the album Tupelo Honey
- B-side: "Starting a New Life"
- Released: December 1971
- Genre: Country soul, country rock
- Length: 6:54; 3:59 (single version)
- Label: Warner Bros.
- Songwriter: Van Morrison
- Producers: Van Morrison, Ted Templeman

Van Morrison singles chronology
| "Wild Night" (1971) | "Tupelo Honey" (1971) | "(Straight to Your Heart) Like a Cannonball" (1972) |

Official audio
- "Tupelo Honey" on YouTube

"Tupelo Honey" is a popular song written by Northern Irish singer-songwriter Van Morrison and the title song from his 1971 album, Tupelo Honey. The title derives from an expensive, mild-tasting tupelo honey produced in the southeastern United States. Released as a single in 1971, it reached number 47 on the U.S. pop chart.

The melody, which has a catchy, soulful feel to it, was borrowed from Morrison's song "Crazy Love", released the previous year. This same melody was later used by Van Morrison on the song, "Why Must I Always Explain?", on his 1991 double album, Hymns to the Silence. Morrison has played "Tupelo Honey" in a medley with both "Crazy Love" and "Why Must I Always Explain?" in concert.

== Response ==
In an Uncut review for the album, David Cavanagh remarks: "Building upwards from a gentle flute refrain, and then pushed forwards by mighty fills from jazz drummer Connie Kay who played on Astral Weeks, 'Tupelo Honey' is sung by a man who has grabbed us by the lapels and won't let go until we understand precisely what he's experiencing. On an album where the vocals are exultant to say the least, this song sees Morrison use larynx, diaphragm, teeth and tongue to find new ways of enunciating the lines 'she's as sweet as Tupelo honey' and 'she's all right with me', seemingly in ever-increasing adoration."

Bob Dylan (who performed the song with Morrison during a concert tour in the 1990s) once remarked that "'Tupelo Honey' has always existed and that Morrison was merely the vessel and the earthly vehicle for it". The Allmusic reviewer commented (echoing Bob Dylan): "Morrison's lyrics, singing, and phrasing are so free and natural on the country-soul song that it is indeed hard to imagine that the song, and the original recording of 'Tupelo Honey', has not always been there."

== Other releases ==
A duet with Morrison and Brian Kennedy appears on the 1994 live album A Night in San Francisco. Another duet with Bobby Bland is one of the tracks on the 2007 compilation album The Best of Van Morrison Volume 3. In 2007, the original version of "Tupelo Honey" was remastered and included as one of the hits on Morrison's compilation album, Still on Top - The Greatest Hits.

Morrison has released two filmed performances of the song: "Tupelo Honey" as performed in concert in 1979 was one of the songs on Morrison's first video Van Morrison in Ireland that was released in 1981. A live performance from Morrison's 1980 appearance at the Montreux Jazz Festival is featured on the 2006 DVD Live at Montreux 1980/1974

== Legacy ==
"Tupelo Honey" is featured on the end credits of the 1997 movie Ulee's Gold starring Peter Fonda.

On the sitcom Friends, Ross expresses that he thinks the song to be the most romantic ever.

Bruce Springsteen's "Racing in the Street" is influenced structurally by the Van Morrison song.

The female Asian elephant calf born to Tess on 3 October 2010, at the Houston Zoo was named Tupelo in honor of this song.

Barry Darnell recorded a southern rock version on his 2018 release "Postcards From Tupelo" on Backyard Records in Macon, Georgia.

== Covers ==
- Wayne Toups
- BC & The Blues Crew
- Phil Coulter Orchestra on Van Morrison's tribute album, No Prima Donna: The Songs of Van Morrison.
- Richie Havens
- Doc Holliday
- The Revelators
- Shaye
- Dusty Springfield
- David West on Into the Mystic: An Instrumental Tribute to Van Morrison
- Cassandra Wilson
- Brezz Zelenka
- Little Milton
- Billy Bragg
- The Revelators
- Blackfoot
- The Black Sorrows
- JJ Grey & Mofro
- Warren Haynes
- Jim Horn lead vocal by Vince Gill

== Personnel on original release ==
- Van Morrison – vocals, guitar
- Ronnie Montrose – guitar, backing vocals
- John McFee – pedal steel guitar
- Bill Church – bass
- Rolf "Boots" Houston – flute, backing vocals
- Mark Jordan – piano, electric piano
- Connie Kay – drums
- Gary Mallaber – vibraphone
- Bruce Royston – flute
- Jack Schroer – alto saxophone
- Ted Templeman – organ

== Charts ==
| Chart (1972) | Peak Position |
|---|---|
| Canada Top Singles (RPM) | 35 |
| U.S. Pop Singles | 47 |
