= Sainte-Famille Church =

Church in Kigali, Rwanda

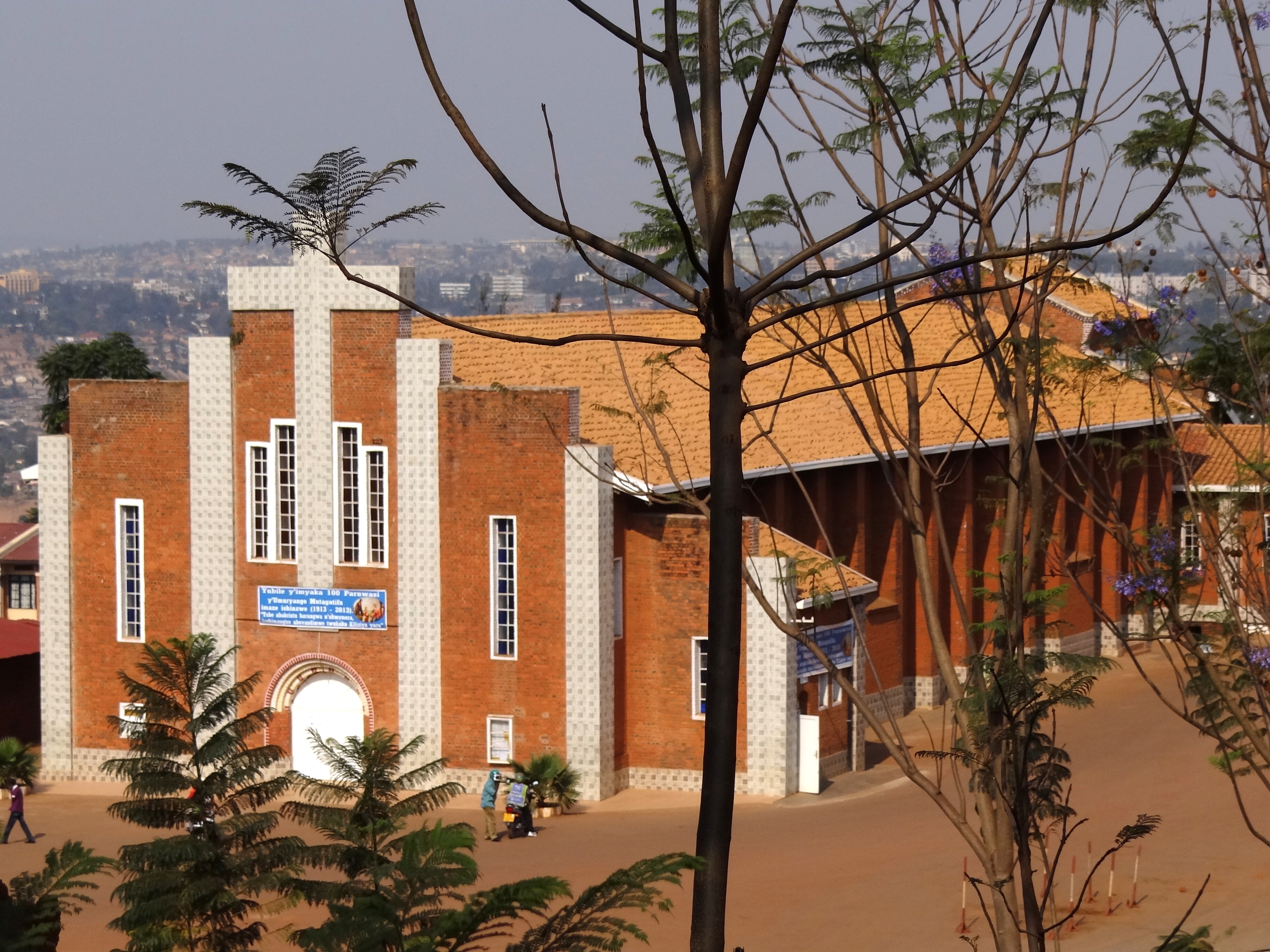

- Location in Rwanda
- 1°56′40″S 30°03′49″E
- Denomination: Catholic

History
- Dedication: Holy Family

Sainte-Famille Church (Holy Family Church) is a Catholic church in Muhima, downtown Kigali, in Rwanda. It is located on a hill, close to the cell of Rugenge. Sainte-Famille Church was the scene of killings during the genocide in April 1994.

== Architecture ==
The building is constructed from red brick, but its facade is embellished with white panels. Besides the parish church, it also includes a visitor centre, a clinic, a primary school, a driving school and buildings leased to individuals by the parish.

== History ==
Constructed when Rwanda was still part of the German colonial empire in 1913, the building is one of the largest churches in the city.

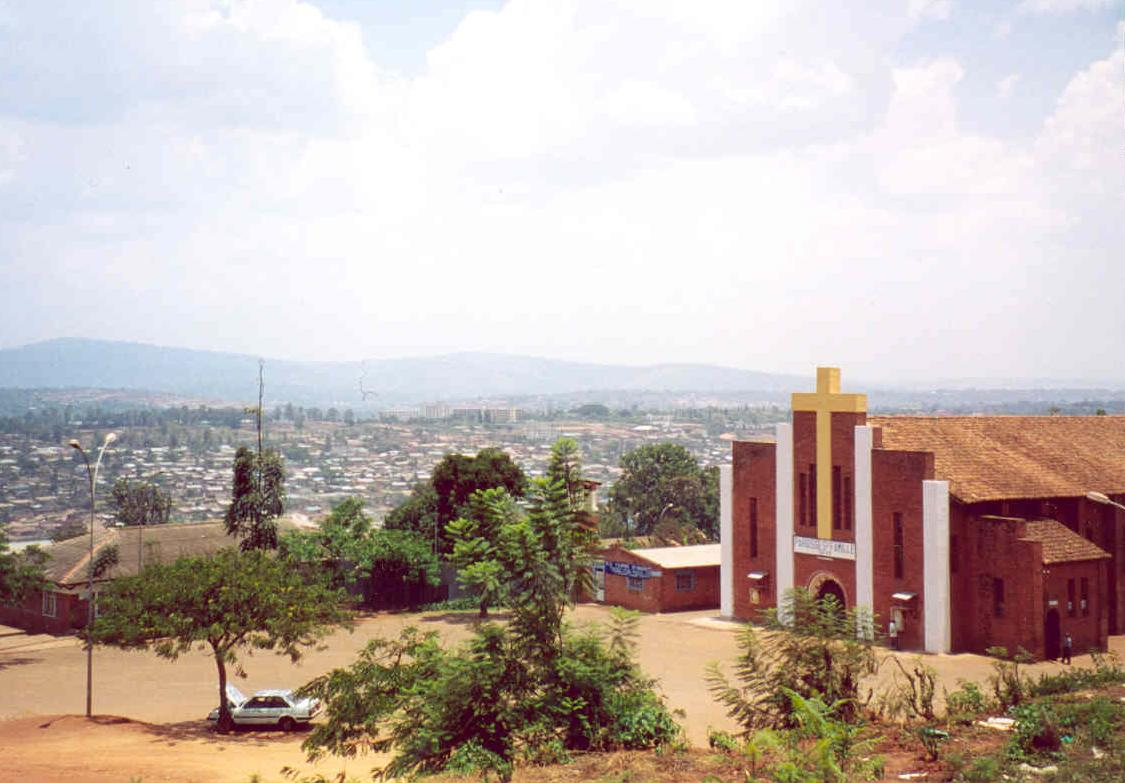
Sainte Famille, a site of genocide

During the Rwandan genocide of 1994 thousands of Tutsi and Hutu took refuge in the church and many were massacred, following the death of President Juvénal Habyarimana. Witnesses have alleged that the priest in charge of the church, Father Wenceslas Munyeshyaka, who had armed himself, helped Hutu Power militias take people from the church to be killed. Fr. Munyeshyaka allegedly agreed to "let the militia pick off those they wanted every now and then."

Speaking ten years later, Father Antoine Kambanda, director of the local branch of the Caritas charity, acknowledged that some members of the Catholic Church in Rwanda had been involved in the killings, although others had done what they could to prevent them.
