= Koffi Kwahulé =

Ivorian writer (born 1956)

Koffi Kwahulé (born 1956) is an Ivorian writer. In 2006 he won the Prix Ahmadou Kourouma for his novel Babyface, published by Éditions Gallimard; he also won the Grand Prix Ivoirien des Lettres for 2006.

A native of Abengourou, Kwahulé began his artistic studies at the National Arts Institute in Abidjan. Upon receiving a state scholarship, he continued his studies in France, working at the école Nationale Supérieure des arts et des techniques du Théâtre de Paris. He received a doctorate in theatrical studies at the Sorbonne. Since 1977, he has written close to twenty plays, some of which have been published by Lansman and Théâtrales. His language has been described as musical, influenced by the rhythms of jazz. Today Kwahulé is among the most popular African playwrights in the world; his work has been translated into numerous languages, and his plays have been shown in Europe, the United States, and Canada.
