= Michael Caton-Jones =

Scottish film director

- Born: Michael Jones; 15 October 1957 (age 69); Broxburn, West Lothian, Scotland
- Occupations: Director; producer

Michael Caton-Jones (born Michael Jones; 15 October 1957) is a Scottish director and producer of film and television.

== Biography ==
Caton-Jones grew up in Broxburn, near Edinburgh. He moved to London and squatted in Stoke Newington. He attended the National Film and Television School.

He was instrumental in casting Leonardo DiCaprio in his first major film role in This Boy's Life (1993).

In October 2017, Caton-Jones told BuzzFeed News that he was forced from the production of the 1998 crime drama film B. Monkey when he refused to fire lead actress Sophie Okonedo, whom producer Harvey Weinstein had deemed was not "fuckable". Weinstein told Variety that Caton-Jones left the production due to "creative differences". Michael Radford was hired to replace Caton-Jones and Okonedo was replaced by Asia Argento. Argento was one of three women who in 2017 told The New Yorker she had been raped by Weinstein.

== Filmography ==
=== Film ===
Short film

- The Riveter (1986) (Also editor)

Feature film

| Year | Title | Director | Producer | Notes |
|---|---|---|---|---|
| 1989 | Scandal | Yes | No | |
| 1990 | Memphis Belle | Yes | No | |
| 1991 | Doc Hollywood | Yes | No | Cameo as "Maitre D'" |
| 1993 | This Boy's Life | Yes | No | |
| 1995 | Rob Roy | Yes | No | |
| 1997 | The Jackal | Yes | Yes | Cameo as "Man in Video" |
| 2002 | City by the Sea | Yes | Yes | Cameo as "Man in Subway Train" |
| 2005 | Shooting Dogs | Yes | No | |
| 2006 | Basic Instinct 2 | Yes | No | |
| 2015 | Urban Hymn | Yes | No | |
| 2018 | Asher | Yes | No | |
| 2019 | Our Ladies | Yes | Yes | Also writer |

Executive producer

- Rob Roy (1995)
- After the Wedding (2019)

=== Television ===
Miniseries

- Brond (1987)
- World Without End (2012)

TV series

| Year | Title | Notes |
|---|---|---|
| 1988 | Screen Two | Episode "Lucky Sunil" |
| 1998 | Trinity | Episode "Pilot" |
| 2010 | Spooks | 2 episodes |

== Awards and nominations ==
| Year | Association | Category | Work | Result |
|---|---|---|---|---|
| 1986 | Torino Film Festival | Best Short Film | The Riveter | Nominated |
| 1989 | European Film Academy | Young European Film of the Year | Scandal | Nominated |
| 1991 | Fantasporto | Best Film | Memphis Belle | Nominated |
| 2006 | British Independent Film Awards | Best Director | Shooting Dogs | Nominated |
| 2007 | Golden Raspberry Awards | Worst Director | Basic Instinct 2 | Nominated |
| 2016 | Giffoni Film Festival | Golden Gryphon - Generator +18 | Urban Hymn | Won |
| 2016 | Ale Kino! International Young Audience Film Festival | Audience Award | Urban Hymn | Won |
| 2016 | Ale Kino! International Young Audience Film Festival | The Organiser's Prize | Urban Hymn | Won |
| 2022 | BAFTA Scotland | Best Feature Film | Our Ladies | Nominated |
