= Maryan (film) =

2013 Tamil film by Bharat Bala

- Theatrical release poster
- Directed by: Bharat Bala
- Written by: Joe D'Cruz (Dialogue)
- Screenplay by: Bharat Bala; Sriram Rajan
- Story by: Bharat Bala
- Produced by: V. Ravichandran
- Starring: Dhanush; Parvathy Thiruvothu
- Cinematography: Marc Koninckx
- Edited by: Vivek Harshan
- Music by: A. R. Rahman,Yuvan Shankar Raja
- Production company: Aascar Film Pvt Ltd
- Distributed by: Aascar Film Pvt Ltd
- Release date: 19 July 2013
- Running time: 133 minutes
- Country: India
- Language: Tamil

Maryan (/mərɪjɒ̃/ transl. Immortal) is a 2013 Indian Tamil-language survival drama film directed by Bharat Bala, and produced by V. Ravichandran, under the banner Aascar Films, starring Dhanush and Parvathy Thiruvothu. The film has music and background score composed by A. R. Rahman; cinematography and editing were done by Marc Koninckx and Vivek Harshan respectively. The dialogues in the film were penned by Joe D' Cruz. Oscar-award winner Resul Pookutty was the sound designer of the film.

The film revolves around a story of human survival adapted from a newspaper article of a real-life crisis event, when three oil workers from Tamil Nadu were kidnapped and taken hostage in Sudan by mercenaries. Bharatbala narrated the story to Dhanush in September 2011, and the film was announced officially in March 2012, revealing the details of the cast and crew. The commencement of the principal photography took place on the same date, and was primarily shot across Sudan and Kanyakumari in Tamil Nadu. The underwater scenes were filmed in Andamans and scenes featuring arid land were filmed at Rann of Kutch in Gujarat.

The film released in Auro 3D sound format on selective screens in India and worldwide on 19 July 2013. The film received positive critical reception in India And it was declared as a box office hit. The film had the biggest opening in the United States amongst all Indian films releasing on the same date. The dubbed Telugu version of the film titled Mariyaan was released on 11 September 2015 by SVR Media.

== Plot ==
Mariyaan Joseph is a fisherman in a village named Neerody in Kanniyakumari district, Tamil Nadu. He has an auspicious bond with sea and proudly claims himself as "Kadal Raasa" (King of Ocean). Panimalar falls in love with Maryan and does not shy away in confessing it to him. Maryan is loved and longed by Panimalar, but sadly, her feelings are not reciprocated. The more Maryan tries to keep Panimalar away from him, the closer she tries to get. This eventually leads to him falling for her. Once, Panimalar is caught in unfortunate circumstances and to support her financially, Maryan is forced to take up employment on contract basis for two years in Sudan. He then befriends Saami, and he is his only companion for four years. He successfully completes his tenure and packs bags in jubilation to return to his lady love, but tragedy strikes in the form of Sudanese extremists, who end up kidnapping Maryan and two of his coworkers, demanding money for their freedom. One of his coworkers gets killed by the head terrorist. After 21 days in captivity, Maryan escapes with Saami and runs for his life. He gets separated from Saami, who gets killed later on, and gets lost in the desert and suffers from dehydration and confronts cheetahs as his mirage. After finding the coast, he fights the terrorist who catches up with him and escapes. He then returns to his village where his love is waiting for him and finally reunited with her.

== Cast ==
- Dhanush as Maryan Vijayan Joseph
- Parvathy Thiruvothu as Panimalar
- Jagan as Sami
- Appukutty as Sakkarai
- Uma Riyaz Khan as Seeli
- Salim Kumar as Thomayya
- Vinayakan as Theekkurissi
- Imman Annachi as Kuttyandi
- Ankur Vikal as Bappan
- Christopher Minnie as Head Terrorist
- Barry Mydou as Al-Jazeera
- Dagbeh Tweh
- Hari Krishnan as Fisherman
- Joe D'Cruz as Negotiator at Hospital (cameo role)

== Production ==
=== Development ===
"I was one of the jury members at the National awards committee that chose Dhanush as the best actor for Aadukalam. His performance in Aadukalam moved me. I was looking for a real person to carry this character. I needed to believe the character, his emotions and his journey. Who else but Dhanush could give me what I wanted?"

— Director Bharat Bala on approaching Dhanush, who had won the 58th National Film Award for Best Actor for his performance in Aadukalam.

In early 2011, director Bharat Bala read about a 2008 incident involving three immigrant oil workers from India being kidnapped in the Darfur region of Sudan and how they had managed to escape from post being hostages. While improvising his script, the director met the former hostages who were held for 21 days under captivity. In late September 2011, the director narrated the first half of the film script to actor Dhanush and he agreed play the character Maryan. During this time, the filmmaker was done with half of the screenplay. Following his casting in the film, actor Dhanush became involved in character and screenplay-related discussions that were carried on for six months. In March 2012, the film and collaborations were officially announced. After a lot of research, the director came up with the film title and stated it is the name of the character. In Tamil it translates to "A man who never dies". As per the film script, it implies that the spirit of the man never dies.

The director opined that the fishing community in southern India goes through terrible hardship and countries like Nigeria, Sudan, Libya borrow them as hard labor. The character played by actor Dhanush is a physically strong, economically poor but simple man from a very remote village who was in need of a job and hence, this forms the outline of the film. Parvathy was signed on to play a key role as character Maryan's love interest after a successful audition. The director was inspired by the 2008 French-Liberian film Johnny Mad Dog, which starred a real-life group of LURD child soldiers and subsequently chose them as well as the cinematographer of that film, Marc Koninckx, to be a part of Maryan.

A press release from March 2013 along with a poster revealed the film's outline as "A young man is faced with adversity. Life deals him immense challenges, and forces him to struggle to thrive. But he does, nevertheless, fighting to survive by thriving on the sheer undying spirit of the human will to survive. Along his thrilling journey is a tryst with adventure, a smattering of drama and a gritty tale that shows the power of love in extreme circumstances. And that is the story of Maryan." In an interview with Zee News, Bharatbala quoted, "Even though [Maryan] is about the fight for survival, it deals with several other emotions such as love, separation and struggle. The story recounts a beautiful journey about the separation of the protagonist from his loved ones and his struggle to reunite".

=== Filming ===
As the film's story takes place in Sudan and in Kanyakumari, India, Bharatbala noted that filming had to take place in two contrasting terrains. The sandy rugged locations in Africa were shot in Liberia, made to look like Sudan, and several other portions were shot in a month. Subsequent close-up scenes featuring supporting cast members from Africa were filmed in India. The first schedule of the film began in Namibia, with scenes including a fight sequence supervised by Dilip Subarayan, being canned. The song "Nenje Ezhu" was shot in Namibia's Coastal Deserts featuring the leading duo. Dhanush also shared screen space with a cheetah.

The final schedule of the film started in Nagercoil, Tamil Nadu in November 2012 and filming took place over a couple of months throughout the coastal region of South India. Filming was also held in Mandaikadapudur village close to Kanyakumari, India, named as Neerodi in the film. The entire film was shot in reverse with the climax scenes being filmed first and hence the last scene shot was the beginning scene of the film. Dhanush underwent a special ocean diving course, to swim up to 50 feet underwater. Bharat Bala said that Dhanush would jump with the diving suit, go deep, settle down and get rid of the suit and then surge for the actual shot. Dhanush had two underwater support divers to supply him air during the underwater scenes. The underwater scenes were filmed in Andamans. Certain arid land scenes were also shot at Rann of Kutch in Gujarat.

The film incorporates firm Barco NV's Auro 11.1 surround sound technology. The re-recording in the Auro format was done at composer A R Rahman's AM Studios making it the first Tamil film to mix native sounds in the format. Bharatbala claimed, one would find three different contrasting uses of the Auro 3D sound in the film. First, in the fishing village and the feel of the ocean surface, then deep into the desert and the sonic sounds and textures of the ocean, 50–55 feet under the water. He revealed through Twitter that the film's digital intermediate works were completed by 9 July 2013. Scenes during the making of the movie were placed with the end credits of the film.

== Soundtrack ==
The music and background score of the film was composed by A. R. Rahman. The complete soundtrack album was released at the composer's recording studio in Chennai on 17 May 2013, along with Raanjhanaa, another album composed by Rahman. The album was also made available as mastered for iTunes version. The day after release, the track "Nenjae Ezhu" topped all the charts with over one crore online listeners. After one month of the release of the soundtrack album, the songs "Nenjae Ezhu" and "Kadal Raasa Naan" attained the peak position on the Radio Mirchi South Top 20 charts, whereas "Sonapareeya" peaked at #3 and "Innum Konjam Neram" at #18. The soundtrack album was entitled as "Tamil Album of Year" in iTunes’ Best of 2013.

== Controversies ==
The third teaser as well as a promotional film poster depicting a smoking Dhanush were criticised by former Union Minister of Health and Family Welfare of India, Anbumani Ramadoss. He claimed that the scenes prioritise smoking in the movie and hence it is a punishable offence to appear smoking in cinemas. Following this, reports claimed that the actor was in discussions with the director for the removal of such contents from the film.

== Marketing ==
The first official poster of the film was released on 28 March 2013. A thirty-second teaser featuring only Dhanush only released on 29 March 2013. On 31 March 2013, another 40-second teaser with a musical score was released that showed Dhanush with a spear in his hand, diving into deep sea in a breath and hunting on the seabed. The third teaser of 30 seconds was released on 4 April 2013. It depicted the actor fighting and smoking. The teaser of the song "Nenje Ezhu" was released on 26 April 2013. It crossed over three lakh views on YouTube in less than two days. A. R. Rahman extended an invitation through YouTube for the premiere of the song "Nenjae Ezhu" on 3 May 2013. The official trailer was released on 1 May 2013. After the trailer garnered nearly seven lakh views in one day on Sony India's music channel, it was re-released as an upgraded Vevo version. On 13 June 2013, a press meet headed by the director claimed that the film utilised the Auro 3D sound technology. The actor, director and the music composer promoted the film at an event at Jaya TV studios that was aired live on 23 June 2013.

The promotions for the dubbed Telugu version of the film began from February 2015. The dubbed trailer was released on 14 February 2015.

== Release ==
Maryan was initially set to release on 31 May 2013. Due to post-production and re-recording works, the release date was changed to 21 June 2013. There was a scarcity of scrutiny theatres for the certification process so, the film was censored on 17 June 2013. The film was given a U/A certificate by the Censor Board for its theme and some violence in the climax. However, it was re-censored for entertainment tax relief and hence, was given a U certificate. The release date of 21 June 2013 was cancelled to avoid clash with Dhanush's Hindi debut film Raanjhanaa and delayed process for censoring. The film was eventually released on 19 July 2013.

The estimate number of screens of the film in Tamil Nadu were 350. As of July 2013, 27 screens out of these were equipped with the Auro 3D surround sound. The release in remaining India would be 100. Maryan wasn't released in Andhra Pradesh whereas out of 50 screens all over Karnataka, the film released on 39 screens in Bangalore, three in Mysuru, two in Mangaluru and rest in other areas of the state. In Kerala, distribution rights were acquired by Sagara Entertainment, releasing the film in about 79 screens. The Telugu version was distributed by SVR Media.

Bharat Creations secured the distribution rights of the film in the United States and North America. The screens in United States were 25 whereas 6 in Canada. The film was also released in several UK cities. A special screening of the film was held at Mumbai on 11 August 2013.

== Reception ==
=== Critical reception ===
The film received generally positive reviews upon release. The film's technicalities, performances of the lead actors and the score were applauded by the critics.

At The Times of India, N Venkateswaran gave the film 4 out of 5 stars and quoted, "A soulful love story, but candy floss is not on the menu." At The New Indian Express, Malini Mannath wrote, "Cocktail of love and action, lyrical in its narrative style in the first half, the film could, however, have done with more coherence and conviction in its second half". S Sarawasthi of Rediff gave the film 3 stars out of 5 and claimed, "Mariyaan is a beautiful love story. However, what brings the film down a notch is the pace, especially the second half, which seems to drag quite a bit. And though the film may not appeal to all, it is definitely a must watch." Baradwaj Rangan of The Hindu noted, "A wonderful romance, but needed to be more." Vivek Ramz of in.com summarised, "'Mariyaan' is a realistic and touching love saga and definitely deserves a watch! Better watch it in Auro 3D screen to experience it best." He rated the film 3.5 stars out of 5.

=== Box office ===
International

At the box office of United States, the film had the biggest opening amongst all Indian films releasing on the same date. In its opening weekend, at the UK and Ireland Box Office the film has collected £13,675 on 5 screens. The film earned approximately ₹10 lakh (equivalent to ₹21 lakh or US$22,000 in 2026) in the second weekend. The total collections, one month estimate was ₹23.23 lakh (equivalent to ₹48 lakh or US$51,000 in 2026). At the Australian box office, the film raked in approximately ₹25 lakh (equivalent to ₹51 lakh or US$55,000 in 2026) at the end of the second weekend.

Domestic

The film netted approximately ₹1.65 crore (equivalent to ₹3.4 crore or US$360,000 in 2026) in first weekend from nearly 35 screens and overall 531 shows in Chennai and suburbs. 85% average occupancy was recorded for these days.

== Accolades ==
Distributor	Date announced	Category	Recipient	Result	Reference
Edison Awards	January 2014	Best Actor	Dhanush	Nominated	
Edison Awards	January 2014	Best Music Director	A R Rahman	Nominated	
Edison Awards	January 2014	Best Playback Singer – Male	Yuvan Shankar Raja (for the song "Kadal Raasa Naan")	Nominated	
Edison Awards	January 2014	Best DOP (cinematography)	Marc Koninckx	Nominated	
Edison Awards	January 2014	Best Choreographer	Bharathi Raghuraam	Nominated	
Filmfare Awards	12 July 2014	Critics Best Actor – Tamil	Dhanush	Won	
Filmfare Awards	12 July 2014	Best Music Director	A R Rahman	Nominated	
Filmfare Awards	12 July 2014	Best Playback Singer – Male	Yuvan Shankar Raja (for the song "Kadal Raasa Naan")	Nominated	
8th Vijay Awards	5 July 2014	Best Actor	Dhanush	Nominated	
8th Vijay Awards	5 July 2014	Best Actress	Parvathy Thiruvothu	Nominated	
8th Vijay Awards	5 July 2014	Favourite Hero	Dhanush	Nominated	
8th Vijay Awards	5 July 2014	Best Cinematographer	Marc Koninckx	Nominated	
8th Vijay Awards	5 July 2014	Best Male Playback Singer	Yuvan Shankar Raja	Won	
8th Vijay Awards	5 July 2014	Best Male Playback Singer	A.R. Rahman	Nominated	
8th Vijay Awards	5 July 2014	Best Female Playback Singer	Shweta Mohan	Nominated	
8th Vijay Awards	5 July 2014	Best Lyricist	Kabilan, A.R.Rahman	Nominated	
8th Vijay Awards	5 July 2014	Best Background Score	A.R.Rahman	Nominated	
8th Vijay Awards	5 July 2014	Best MakeUp	Ramesh Mohanty, Thomas Van Der Nest	Nominated	
SIIMA Awards	12–13 September 2014	Best Actor	Dhanush	Nominated	
SIIMA Awards	12–13 September 2014	Best Actor (Critics)	Dhanush	Won	
SIIMA Awards	12–13 September 2014	Best Actress	Parvathy Thiruvothu	Nominated	
SIIMA Awards	12–13 September 2014	Best Actress (Critics)	Parvathy Thiruvothu	Won	
SIIMA Awards	12–13 September 2014	Best Music	A.R.Rahman	Nominated	
SIIMA Awards	12–13 September 2014	Best Male Playback Singer	Vijay Prakash	Nominated	
SIIMA Awards	12–13 September 2014	Best Female Playback Singer	Shweta Mohan	Nominated	
SIIMA Awards	12–13 September 2014	Best Cinematographer	Marc Koninckx	Nominated	
Behindwoods Gold Summit Award	2014	Best Actress	Parvathy Thiruvothu	Won	
