= Galaxy Studios =

Music production facility in Belgium

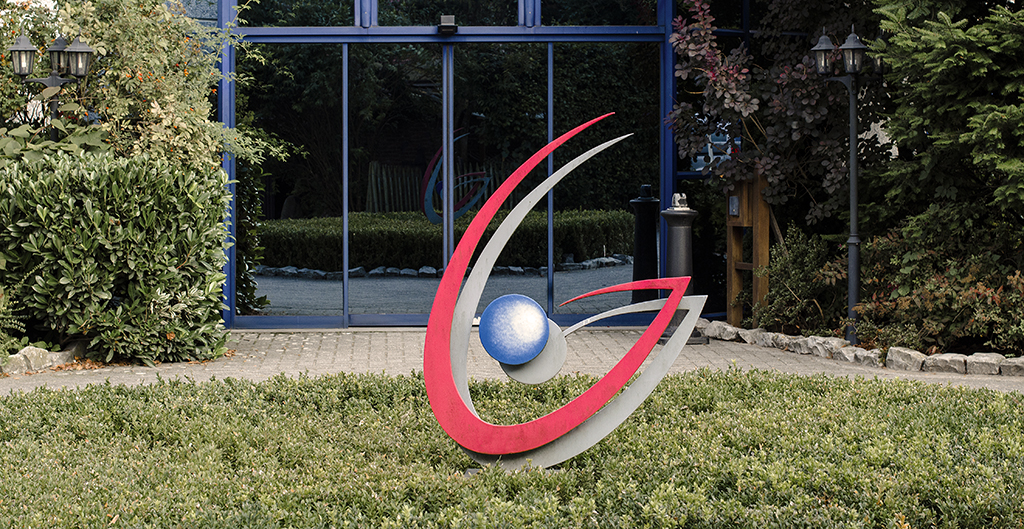
- Type: Corporation NV
- Industry: Film industry, Music industry, Post production, Film score, Film production
- Founded: 1982
- Headquarters: Mol, Belgium, Europe
- Key people: Wilfried van Baelen (CEO), Guy van Baelen (CFO)
- Owner: Wilfried van Baelen & Guy van Baelen
- Website: galaxystudios.com

Galaxy Studios is a music recording, mixing, mastering and post-production facility established in 1980 by two brothers, Wilfried and Guy Van Baelen. It is the origin of Auro 3D sound technology, invented and developed by CEO Wilfried Van Baelen in 2005. Galaxy studios facilitates in Mol, Belgium various music and film post workflows: music recording, music mixing, mastering, sound-editorial services, Foley, dubbing, audio-post mixing, film grading and film mastering. Galaxy Studios has a film financing department called Mollywood that co-produces A/V media productions.

== History ==
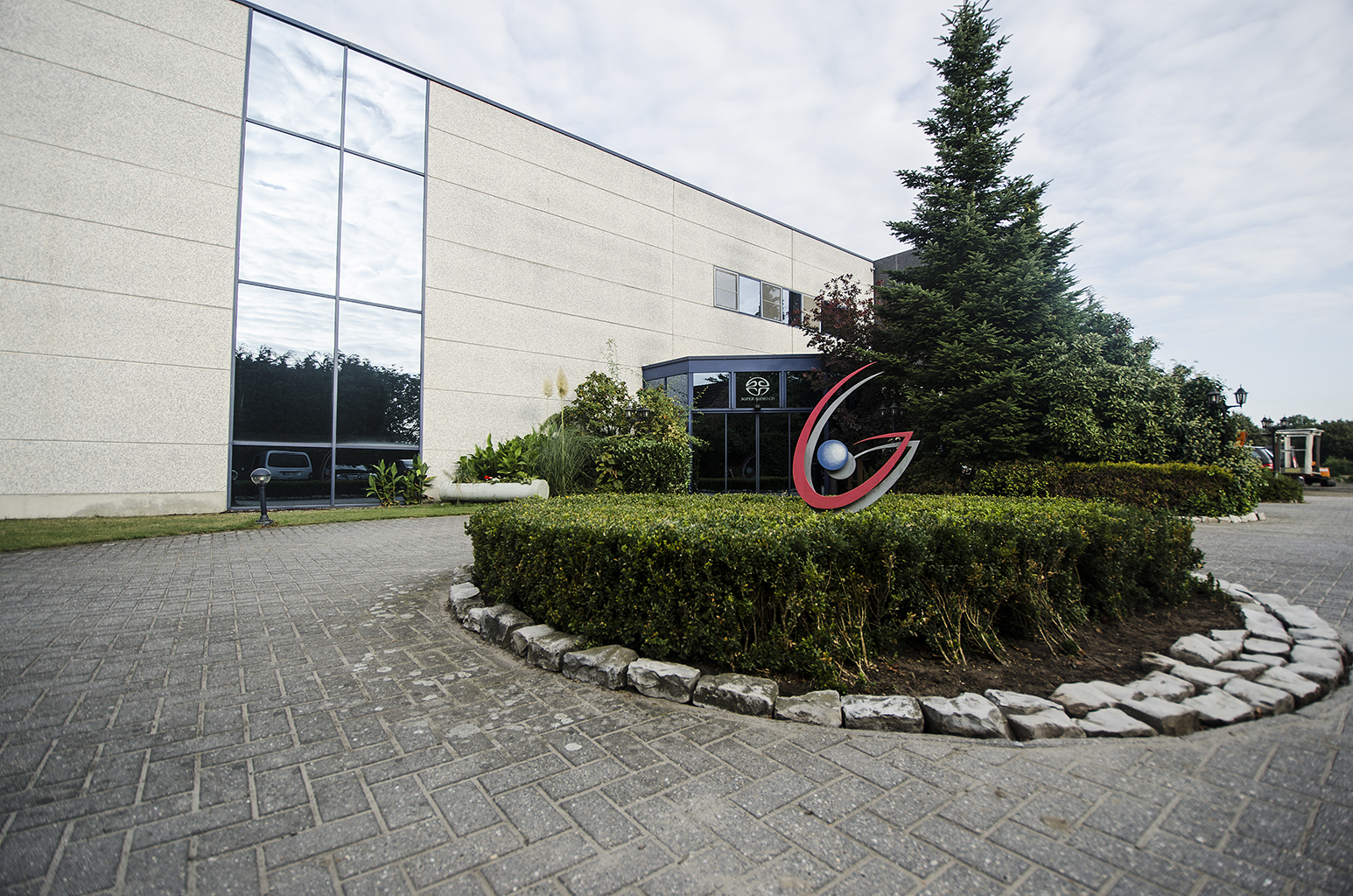
Galaxy Studios Post-production facility, Mol, Belgium

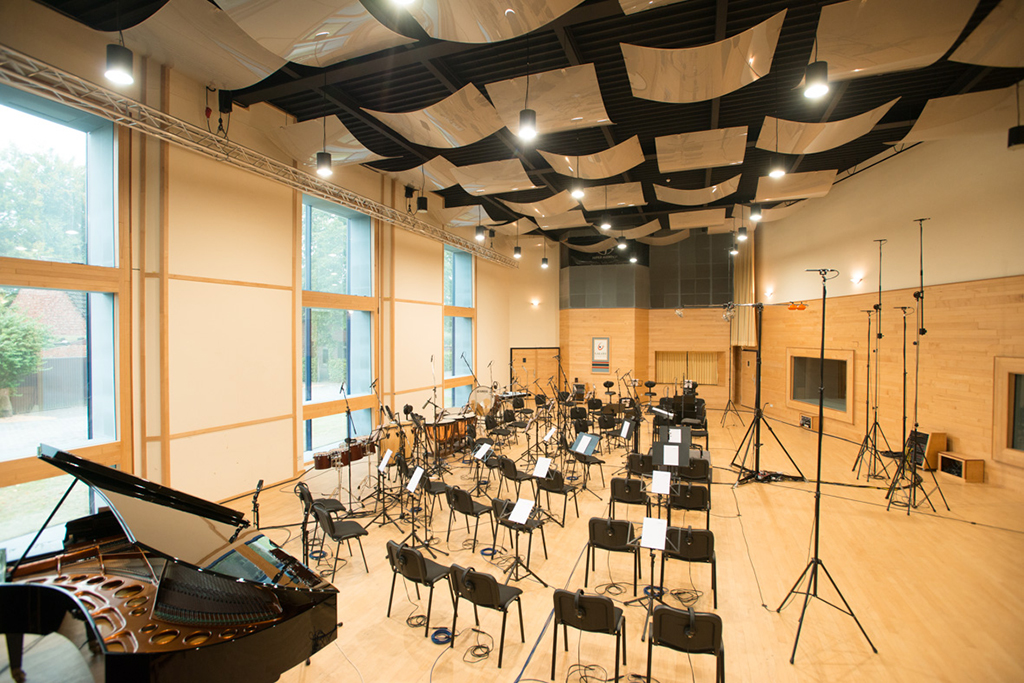
Galaxy Studios Galaxy Hall recording studio, Mol, Belgium

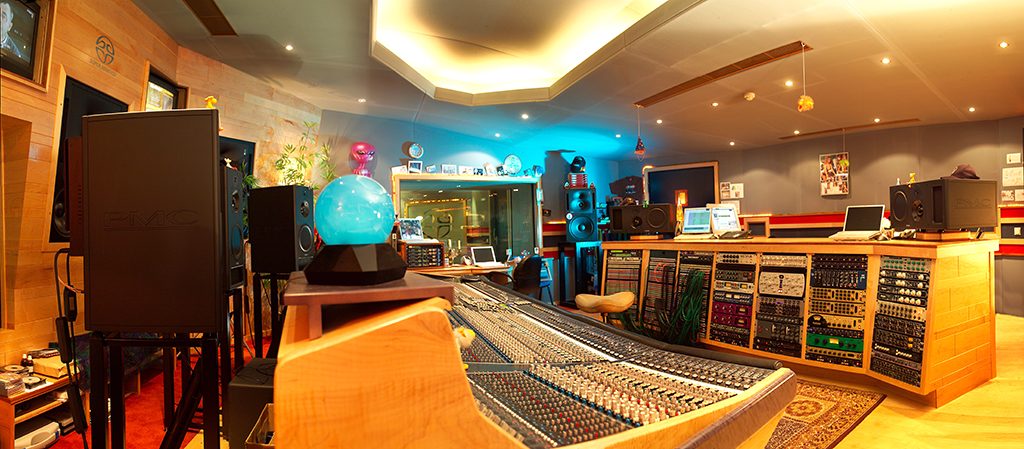
Galaxy Studios API Control room, Mol, Belgium

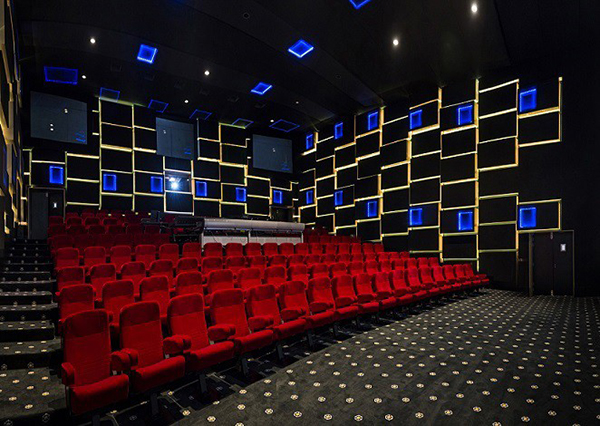
Galaxy Studios Aurothorium dubbing stage for Auro 3D, Mol, Belgium

Wilfried and Guy Van Baelen were 18 and 15 years old, respectively, when they started the Galaxy Studios in 1980 in the backyard of their parents home in Mol, Belgium. The official registration of the company under the name Studio Galaxy was 2 years later in 1982.

In 1991 they started to make up the plan for a new facility. They partnered with acoustic engineer Eric Desart of the Gerber Group and Professor Gerrit Vermeir at the University of Leuven and accepted the challenge of building the Galaxy Studios.

From 1992 to 1995 the van Baelen brothers oversaw the first phase of the construction on the new facility. A total of 185,000 man hours was spent in the construction of three studios, a 350m2 live recording area, various adjacent recording areas, a restaurant and hotel accommodations. By using standalone concrete bunkers, mounted on helical springs, they achieved a sound isolation of 100.7 dB between each isolated bunker.

In 1996 phase 2 of the construction of the Galaxy Studios village was begun. This period commissioned an SSL 9080J, entering the field of 5.1 sound recording and mixing. An extra pre-production studio with the Amek Angela Console and a fifth small studio for vocal recording and a private lounge and producers suite were added in phase 2.

In 1999 the final phase of construction was realised with a mastering studio and a film dubbing stage for audio visual productions. In total the Galaxy Studios took 7 years to build and 318,000 man hours were spent to achieve the full construction of the facility.

Around 2003, Sony Music installed the first DSD (Direct Stream Digital) console for SACD production into Galaxy Studios.

In 2005 Wilfried van Baelen introduced the Auro-3D sound technology system to the industry. The Auro-3D format creates 3D sound by using a three-layered channel system based on the existing 5.1 Surround sound format for film. The technology adds a height and top layer to the 5.1 system. Applications also include the music and gaming industry.

In August 2013, Galaxy Studios opened its first Auro-3D purposed dubbing stage: the AuroTorium. Currently, Galaxy is further expanding the facilities with two additional dub stages, a foley stage, editorial suites, a colour grading suite and new hotel accommodations.

== Mollywood ==
Mollywood is a film funding and tax sheltering company that was established in Mol, Belgium in 2009 as part of the Galaxy Studios holding, Galaxy Studios Group. With the tax incentives introduced by the Belgium government, the company can invest in audiovisual productions. The name Mollywood refers to the in Los Angeles based Hollywood district which is famous for its audio visual productions, and to the city of Mol in which Mollywood is established.

Mollywood (co) productions include:

- The Strange Color of Your Body's Tears (2013)
- A Farewell to Fools (2013)
- Bobby en de Geestenjagers (2013)
- Verliefd op Ibiza (2013)
- Het Bombardement (2012)
- Koning van Katoren (2012)
- De verbouwing (2012)
- Noordzee, Texas (2011)
- Kill Me Please (2010)

== Zilvermeer Productions ==
Zilvermeer Productions was established in 2014 as the Galaxy Studios Group production house. Zilvermeer develops, produces and co-produces film and TV projects for the Benelux and international market.

Zilvermeer (co) productions include:

- Domino
- Bankier van het Verzet (2018)
- Alberta (2016)
- Knielen Op Een Bed Violen (2015)
- Trollie (2015)

== Auro-3D ==
Galaxy Studios is the home of the immersive 3D audio technology Auro 3D. The concept and formats were developed in 2005 by Wilfried Van Baelen, and in 2010 Auro Technologies was formed by The Van Baelen brothers together with their partner Alfred Schefenacker to develop and promote the technology.

Auro-3D is designed along three layers of sound (Surround, height and overhead ceiling) rather than the single horizontal layer used in the traditional 5.1 sound format. It creates a spatial sound experience by adding a height layer around the audience on top of the traditional 2D Surround sound system. This extra layer reveals both localized sounds and height reflections which are crucial for our brains to better interpret the sounds that exist in the lower Surround layer.

In 2011 a partnership was struck with the Belgian display hardware manufacturer Barco to incorporate Auro-3D in their cinema hardware setup, and in the same year the first worldwide installations of the cinema format Auro 11.1 were deployed. Auro Technologies also made alliances with partners in other markets, such as home AV (with Datasat) and gaming (with AudioKinetic).
