= Rock On 2 =

2016 Indian film by Shujaat Saudagar

- Theatrical release poster
- Directed by: Shujaat Saudagar
- Written by: Screenplay: Pubali Chaudhary; Dialogues: Farhan Akhtar
- Story by: Abhishek Kapoor; Pubali Chaudhary
- Produced by: Ritesh Sidhwani
- Starring: Arjun Rampal; Farhan Akhtar; Shraddha Kapoor; Purab Kohli; Prachi Desai; Shashank Arora
- Narrated by: Purab Kohli
- Cinematography: Marc Koninckx
- Edited by: Anand Subaya
- Music by: Shankar–Ehsaan–Loy
- Production company: Excel Entertainment
- Distributed by: Eros International
- Release date: 11 November 2016
- Running time: 143 minutes
- Country: India
- Language: Hindi
- Budget: ₹45 crore (US$4.7 million)
- Box office: ₹15.70 crore (US$1.6 million)

Rock On 2 is a 2016 Indian Hindi-language musical drama film directed by debutant Shujaat Saudagar and produced by Farhan Akhtar and Ritesh Sidhwani under Excel Entertainment. A sequel to the 2008 film Rock On!!, it is written by Pubali Chaudhary and Akhtar on the basis of a story jointly contributed by Chaudhary and Abhishek Kapoor, who scripted and helmed the original, and features Akhtar, Arjun Rampal, Purab Kohli, Prachi Desai and Shahana Goswami (billed in a special appearance) reprising their roles from the original, while Shraddha Kapoor and Shashank Arora, with uncredited debutante Priyanshu Painyuli appearing in new pivotal roles.

Following a prolonged development hell, the film was eventually revived with Saudagar set to direct, taking over from Abhishek, with Chaudhary, a regular collaborator, contributing to the script. Set largely in Mumbai and Meghalaya, its soundtrack was composed by Shankar–Ehsaan–Loy, with lyrics by Javed Akhtar.

Unlike its predecessor, Rock On 2 received mixed-to-negative reviews and was unsuccessful at the box office, grossing only ₹15.70 crore worldwide. This was attributed to the absence of a chartbuster soundtrack and the recent demonetisation drive by the Government, which affected its collections severely.

== Plot ==
Eight years since Magik the band won its comeback Channel V contest as a tribute to its late member Rob Nancy, its members are reintroduced to the audience through the lens of Kedar 'Killer "KD" Drummer' Zaveri, the band's lead drummer. Lead guitarist Joseph "Joe" Mascarenhas has finally found strong financial success as a judge on a successful reality show and is a working partner with KD at 12 Bar & Blues, a club they cofounded. KD narrates how five years ago, Aditya "Adi" Shroff, Magik's lead singer, left the city due to a painful experience, and has since been residing in a little town in Meghalaya.

Jiah Sharma, a young music programmer, is the daughter of once revered sarod player Pandit Vibhuti Sharma, better known as Guruji. Jiah is introduced to Uday Brijkishore Mishra, who has come to her father to learn music and the Sarod from him. Guruji reluctantly agrees, but has a hard time cooperating since Uday's effortless grasp on the sarod triggers haunting memories of his late son. Jiah plays her part in motivating Uday and soon they both come together to achieve common interests. Uday then plays a sarod composition of the song Jiah had recorded earlier. Without informing her, Uday picks a CD containing Jiah's recording of the revised composition and takes it to the Club Bar & Blues Studio, little realizing it would bring about a huge twist of fate and also reunite band members of Magik in the process.

Meanwhile, on his birthday, Adi is visited by Joe and KD along with their families as well as his wife Sakshi and son Rob. As they later gather together, Joe and KD find Adi's poetry in his diary and ask him if he has a new tune they can play; he agrees. The next morning, a regular chat between the trio swiftly turns into a past-hunting argument which reveals that Adi is tormented by the failure of Magik's music label in Mumbai, which took away, along with the money invested, a young, aspiring artist's life. The trio blames each other for certain things that led to the label's downfall, but the argument soon ceases when Joe and Adi pacify each other. As the day ends, Adi bids goodbye to his friends and promises to return soon.

The film flashes back to Magik's old days when Adi recalls how a young boy, Rahul Sharma, insisted that he go through a demo tape of his recordings, though Adi pays no heed ultimately. A few days pass and a wildfire suddenly destroys many parts of the town in Meghalaya, leaving the residents destitute. Left with nothing, Adi travels to Cherrapunji, where he comes across Jiah, succumbing to his physical weaknesses. KD discovers him there and urges him to return to Mumbai and try moving on, but Adi refuses.

Fast forward to the present, Uday and a reluctant Jiah are called by Joe to the studio, where Jiah meets Adi, who has finally relented and returned, and later performs her song live in the studio. Impressed by her skills, Magik members suggest that Jiah sing in an upcoming concert, but Jiah backs out at the last moment for she recalls how Baba disapproves of modern music, calling it a destroyer of the soulfulness and purity of the art; she feels guilty about lying to him and bursts out at Adi when he tries to convince her to rejoin.

Adi and his friends eventually take a shocking retreat when a scuffle between the band members culminates in Uday informing them that Jiah is Guruji's daughter as they realize Rahul is her brother. Amidst a highly tense atmosphere, while Joe refuses to cooperate with Adi and KD in their thoughts of apologizing to Jiah, the story flashes back to five years earlier when Rahul tried to attack Adi outside a concert. The resulting fight attracted a threat from Rahul, following which Rahul killed himself by the time Adi and KD heard his CD and decided to call him. Jiah learns of the truth and breaks off all contact with Magik and Uday and recalls how Baba chided Rahul for ruining the art of Indian music despite his pleas and valid excuses.

Adi learns of further problems in the Meghalaya town, and this causes a rift between him and Sakshi, who is upset that he does not have time for her. Finally, after some hard thinking, Jiah visits Adi in the village and convinces him to stop brooding over Rahul's suicide, stating that he was so dejected with his own life that he ended up messing with Adi's life as well. Adi visits the camp, but there is not much funding available, so Joe and KD come up with the idea of organizing a rock concert in a village near Shillong with some known bands to raise collective funds. However, as soon as Mahendra, the state welfare board chief, who had earlier gotten into an egoistic argument with Adi, learns of this, he orders an ambush on the concert venue, thus ruining everything.

That day, Guruji is called by a news reporter and is surprised to learn that his daughter was at the venue of the attack. During a heated argument, Jiah vents out to Baba that it was he who had killed Rahul by not motivating him for what he needed badly in life. This forces her father to reconsider his outdated approach towards music and artists. Meanwhile, a contestant from Joe's reality show brings some equipment as a replacement for the broken setup. The concert becomes a success as Adi gets Jiah to overcome her fears and apprehensions. The village recovers from its crisis as Mahendra is forced to release funds, Magik reunites eventually, with Uday as a new member, and Jiah becomes a singing sensation.

== Cast ==
- Arjun Rampal as Joseph "Joe" Mascarehas, a reality show judge and club owner
- Farhan Akhtar as Aditya "Adi" Shroff, Magik's lead singer
- Shraddha Kapoor as Jiah Sharma, a singer and a programmer
- Prachi Desai as Sakshi Shroff, Adi's wife
- Purab Kohli as Kedar Zaveri a.k.a. Killer Drummer
- Shashank Arora as Uday Brijkishore Mishra, an aspiring musician
- Kumud Mishra as Pandit Vibhuti Sharma (Baba), Jiah's father
- Priyanshu Painyuli as Rahul Sharma, Jiah's brother
- Dinesh Kumar as Mannjyot
- Luke Kenny as Rob Nancy (cameo), Magik's late member
- Shahana Goswami as Debbie Mascarenhas (cameo), Joe's wife
- Sunidhi Chauhan as herself (cameo), a Sa Re Ga Ma Pa judge
- Salim Merchant as himself (cameo), a Sa Re Ga Ma Pa judge
- Usha Uthup as herself (cameo)
- Vishal Dadlani as himself (cameo)

== Production ==
=== Development ===
Following the release of the first film, there were plans for a sequel. However, a follow-up went through prolonged development hell for almost 8 years. According to Rampal, this was because "it was important to figure out the story." The idea of the sequel was to have the same characters, but explore where they are now after 8 years. Pubali Chaudhuri, a close friend and collaborator of Abhishek Kapoor, who had written and directed the original film, spent 3 years writing the script, based on a story she cowrote with him. During the development phase, the film was initially intended to take place in Himachal Pradesh, but following the attacks of Manipuri students in Delhi, the producers decided to alter the film's setting. Saudagar was watching the incident on the news when Akhtar pinged him up where the two discussed on the issue. Neither him nor Akhtar had been to the North East before, but Kohli who had visited many places there, so he suggested Meghalaya, especially Shillong, as it is also called the "rock capital." Initially, the decision was met with some resistance. Saudagar remarked that the main intent was to bring the North East to Hindi cinema and also highlight the issues people face in the state.

The producers decided that there would be no romantic relationship or love story between the two leads. Saudagar stated, "Rock On 2 is not about an extramarital affair, it's a story of human bonds and is based on modern relationships."

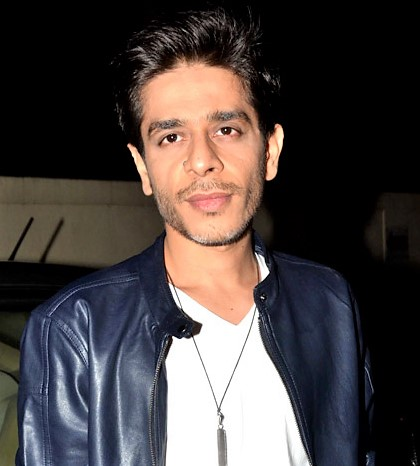
Arora at special screening of the film

=== Pre-production ===
"I wanted to do a film in the North-East. There are North-Eastern students in various parts of India being beaten up and called outsiders. This film is a small attempt to bring the region into popular culture. I’m glad we shot in Shillong. Every person felt a sense of loss when we finished shooting. We'd all love to go back.

— Producer Farhan Akhtar on the decision to make the film in Northeast India.

Shujaat Saudagar, who had previously collaborated with Ritesh Sidhwani on Don 2 as an assistant, agreed to direct the sequel to Rock On after being impressed by the script. Saudagar admitted he is not in favour of sequels, but grew interested in this one after finding the completed story coherent with what he had observed of Rock On.

Akhtar had always wanted to make a film in Northeast India and stated that the film is a "visual treat", a tribute to the people of the North-East and an attempt to bring the whole region into mainstream pop culture.

=== Casting ===
Aside from new entrants Shraddha Kapoor and Arora, the principal cast from the original film all returned for the sequel. The only member from the film's band Magik who did not return for the follow-up was Luke Kenny as his character died in the first film, while Rampal, Akhtar and Kohli all reprised their respective roles, a rare occurrence in Bollywood; Kenny, however, did reprise his role briefly for a song sequence in a flashback. The only other Bollywood sequel to have three or more leads return for a sequel was Pyaar Ka Punchnama 2 (2015). After Rampal won the National Film Award for Best Supporting Actor at the 56th National Film Awards in 2008 for his role in Rock On!!, he rejected all offers thereafter to play a lead role as a musician.

There were offers to play the role of a musician but I did not want to do it. I did not want to do it (musician role) because I had done it (with Rock On) beyond my expectations. I had surpassed the expectations. There was always talk about Rock On 2, so I wanted to preserve it.

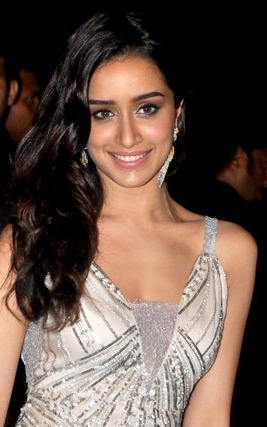
Kapoor, an ardent fan of the original film undertook vocal training for her role.

Kapoor plays Jiah Sharma, a keyboard player, programmer and a singer. She was an ardent fan of the original film and cites the recurring themes of music and friendship in the first film as her prime reason wanting to star in the sequel. After watching the film in theaters, she told her father that if a sequel was made, she would be in it. When she first heard that the filmmakers were making a sequel, she called up Sidhwani to ask if she could be considered for a part. She met Sidhwani and the production team who mainly wanted to hear her sing. She gave a singing audition to composer trio Shankar–Ehsaan–Loy. Although Kapoor had sung before in her previous films, this marks the first time that the singer-actress sings rock songs. Whilst growing up, she took training in classical music from her grandmother, Pandharinath Kolhapure, but ceased training after her grandmother died. For the film, Kapoor undertook vocal training with Samantha Edwards, a jazz vocalist, in order to adapt her voice to the rock genre. Her biggest inspirations as a singer are her grandmother Lata Mangeshkar and her mother Shivangi Kapoor (née Kolhapure). She said that part of what inspired her to star in the film was watching Farhan Akhtar in the original film write his own songs and perform them. Rampal was a little skeptic and grew wary when he first heard about Kapoor's involvement in the film since "she is from a different generation." But, upon hearing her vocals, it instead provided him inspiration.

Kapoor says she and her character Jiah share little resemblance. While she had a sheltered upbringing and would always travel with companies, Jiah is a loner and a reclusive character who chooses to remain aloof and would rather live and travel alone. Saudagar would make her undergo a training process in which she spent as much time alone as possible with herself in order for her to connect to her character. Travelling to Shillong was in a way helpful for this process as she was away from her family. In some instances, she would put up "do not disturb" sign on the door.

I live with my family, so this meant that no one could knock on my door and come in while the sign was up. I needed to do this because Jiah is very aloof. She taught me to be alone. Jiah just packs her bags and takes off. I feel that I’ve learned how to be by myself, just reading a book or listening to music. I think that's important.

The film also marks the third time that Akhtar plays a father in a feature film after Shaadi Ke Side Effects (2014) and in Wazir (2016).

Debutante Priyanshu Painyuli was roped in to essay the character of Kapoor's brother, who plays a crucial role in the story. He was, however, uncredited in the opening titles. Kumud Mishra, who had previously appeared in the Excel Entertainment production Bangistan (2015), was cast as Kapoor and Painyuli's father, a retired musician.

=== Principal photography ===
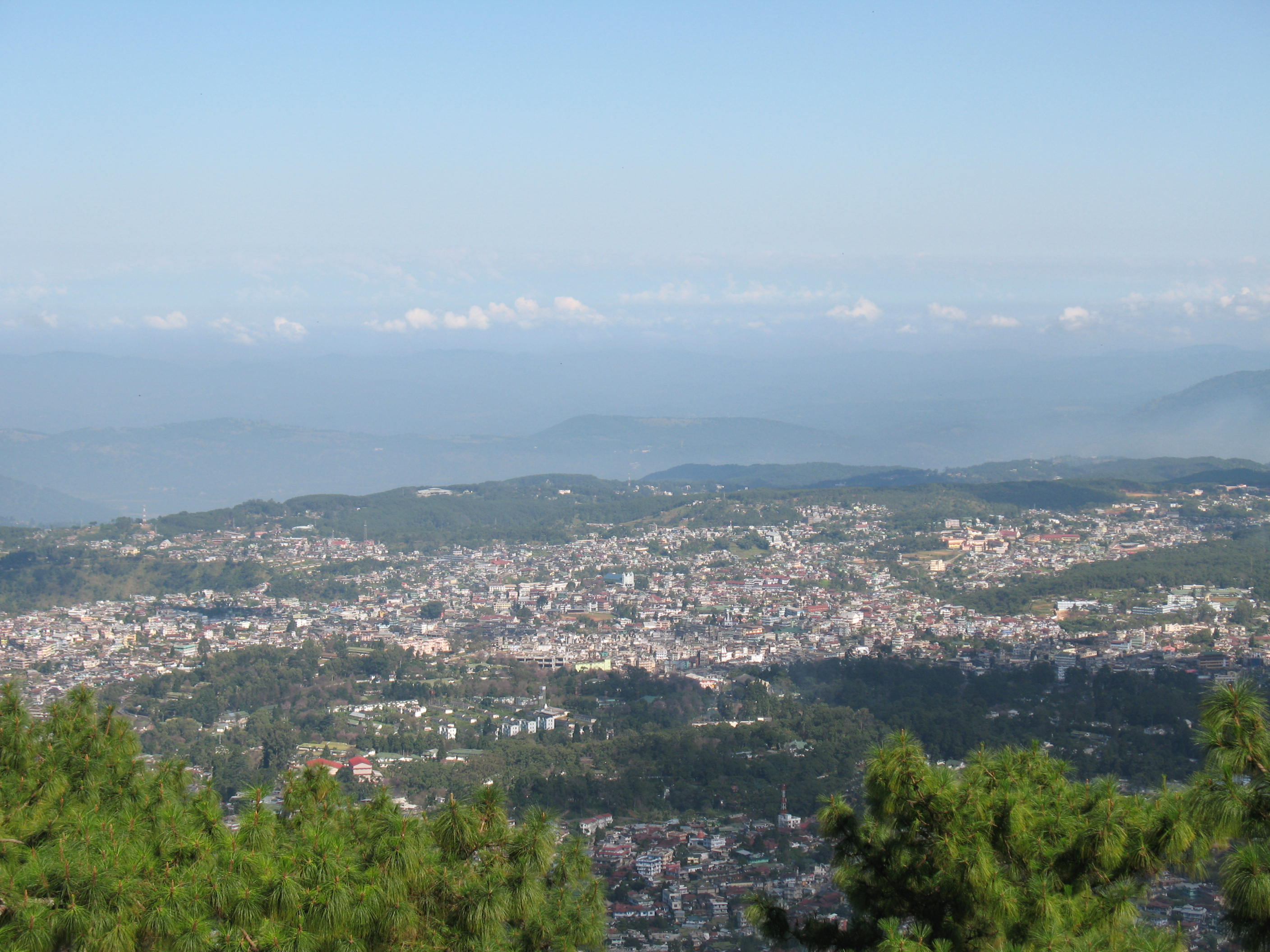
The film was extensively shot in and around the city of Shillong (pictured) unofficially called "the rock capital of India."

Principal photography began in Shillong, Meghalaya on 6 October 2015 and the film was shot in numeours other locations in the eastern part of the state, including Umniuh Village in Ri-Bhoi district, Cherrapunjee and Laitlum. Prior to filming, a memorandum of understanding was signed between Excel Entertainment and the Government of Meghalaya in July 2015. Since the script demanded picturesque, mountainous locations, Sidhwani chose Shillong and its adjacent places in the state of Meghalaya as the ideal locations. Sidhwani visited the state in February 2015 for scouting filming locations. In an interview with The Northeast Today, Akhtar stated that Shillong was the natural choice because of its close history with music saying "we all know that Shillong has a huge history with rock music and it was an obvious choice for the movie," while Saudagar said this was due to the city's passion for rock music. The film was initially set to take place in Himachal Pradesh. By August 2015, the whole cast and crew had arrived in the city to begin production. Akhtar mingled with the people in the villages in order to understand their way of life.

In October 2015, Kapoor flew to Mumbai after an internal injury in her eye – an unknown object flew into her eye which caused a scratch in her cornea. After her treatment, she returned to the city the same month to continue filming.

In June 2016, it was reported that while shooting a live concert sequence, Rampal and Kohli got into a major fight due to creative differences which resulted in the shooting getting stalled for nearly an hour. The incident took place at the Gateway of India in Mumbai where the film was being wrapped with a song shoot. Akhtar, who at first was oblivious to the upheaval situation when he heard about the incident, met the two men in their respective vanity vans and was able to calm them down. The shoot then resumed thereafter and went on smoothly with all three actors returning to the stage. However, Saudagar rebuffed these allegations saying that such an incident never took place.

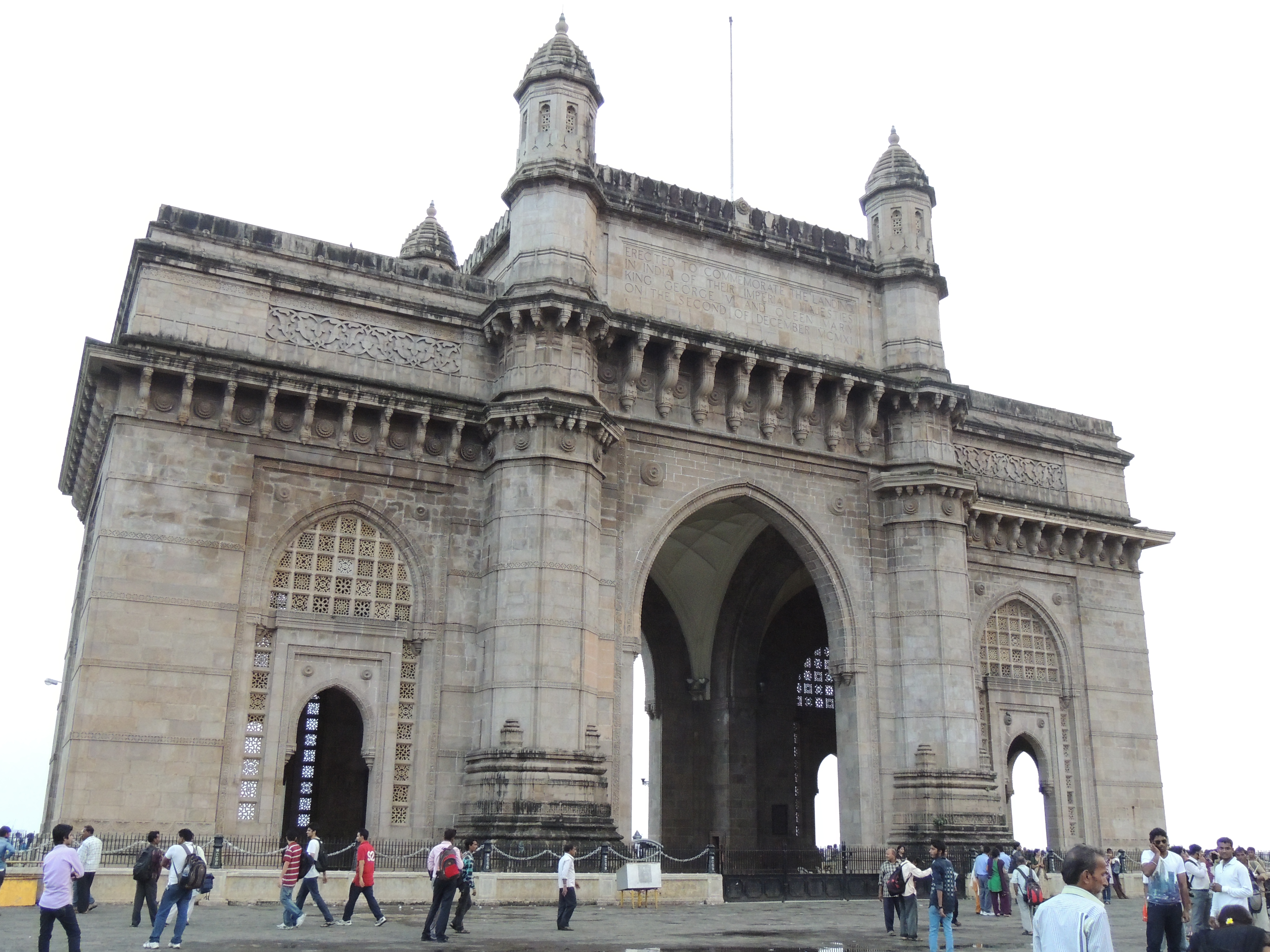
Filming concluded in the Gateway of India, Mumbai in June 2016.

The film had to undergo ten days of reshoots just two weeks before its premiere, making it a rare occurrence in Bollywood. According to an undisclosed source by the Deccan Chronicle, this was done in order to enhance the film. Such claim was also nevertheless dismissed by Saudagar but he said that there were some delays in shooting due to rain in Shillong. Additionally, shooting for the "You Know What I Mean" song took place in Madh Island in Mumbai. Pre-production took place for 77 days while filming lasted for a total of 66 days, ending on 17 June 2016.

=== Post-production ===
Due to part of a Hindi dialogue being spoken unclear by a character from Meghalaya, the CBFC requested the producers to re-dub the dialogues for clarity.

== Soundtrack ==
The film's accompanying soundtrack on the film is composed by Shankar–Ehsaan–Loy. Akhtar and Kapoor sang all parts of their respective songs. According to Saudagar, the soundtrack was as pivotal as the script to the development of the film. Shankar composed the music side by side when Chaudhuri was working on the script. The soundtrack also features music from Shillong-based band Somersault.

== Marketing ==
While the film is predominantly aimed at younger demographics, Excel Entertainment carried out a marketing plan in order to appeal to a much wider audience. The film recouped ₹8–10 crore from various brand tie-ups alone. The first poster was released on 2 September. A live concert by the stars and music directors was held in National Sports Club of India in Mumbai on 23 September, for the album launch. Akhtar and Kapoor, along with members of the former's Farhan Live band embarked on a nationwide concert tour such as in Bangalore, Aurangabad, Maharashtra on 2 November and Hyderabad on 6 November. The first trailer was launched on 24 October in presence of the cast members. On 8 November, the band held a concert at one of University of Delhi's Ramjas College in New Delhi. The band was originally set to perform in one of the university's other college, Kirori Mal College, which is the alma-mater of Kapoor's father, Shakti Kapoor. However, permissions were not granted for performing there due to the staff council allowing concerts only during a specific school festival, and not any other event. Due to her commitments to the film, Kapoor decided to put her shooting schedule her upcoming film, Haseena, on hold until December 2016 in order for her to promote the sequel more robustly. She also delayed a flight to the United States in September 2016 for her Half Girlfriend shooting schedule for the same reason.

The film signed with 10 various brand associations which served as promotional partners, such as Hexa from Tata Motors, Amul, Boat Speakers, Regal Shoes, Nutrilite, Vodafone, Spunk Apparels, Cromā, hike Messenger and Zippo.

== Release ==
The film was released in theaters in India on 11 November 2016. The film was passed with a UA certificate by the CBFC with almost no cuts. On 8 November, three days before the film's release, Prime Minister Narendra Modi announced that the country's two currencies – ₹500 and ₹1000 – would be demonetized from the next day onwards as a means to counter fake currency and exterminate black money and corruption. This would mean that it would not be possible for patrons to purchase tickets from box office using the old notes until Thursday, 10 November, when new ₹500 and ₹2000 notes will be issued. Ticket buyers would also sway away from buying tickets due to limited sources of money and from the other available option of purchasing tickets, via online, since a 'convenience fee' is charged for such method. In order to curb this problem, the film partnered with theater chain PVR Cinemas where ticket buyers will be able to evade paying convenience fees in the company's website and app respectively.

The release date was almost postponed following the demonetization of the said currencies as it would have caused hindrance and limit the purchase of tickets by patrons. However, this decision was later scrapped since the film had already been released in the Gulf and such a decision would lead to piracy. The weekend's two other releases – Saansein and 30 Minutes – were however rescheduled.

== Reception ==
=== Box office ===
The film opened Friday, 11 November, across approximately 700 screens, earning approximately ₹2.02 crore (US$210,000) and witnessed an above-average start by occupying 5–10% of seats on its opening day. The prime factor for the film's low performance was the demonetization of the two currencies as people nationwide were more pre-occupied with depositing, exchanging and withdrawing the currencies and the money would be allocated to other needful resources other than movie tickets since people would want to forgo waiting in long queues as bank would constantly run out of cash. Producer Sidhwani lamented on the performance saying, "We have made a beautiful film and by the time announcement was made, it was Wednesday and the prints were already out. We couldn't afford to push the release date as the piracy laws in our country are not strong enough to protect the movie from getting leaked. Our two years of efforts would have been wasted." He also pointed out that had the postponement decision been made a week before, then they would have gone with it. The film was termed as a disaster by Box Office India because of demonetization.

=== Critical reception ===
The film garnered polarized reception from critics. Praise was aimed at the cast's performances and Marc Koninckx's cinematography, while its screenplay and soundtrack received negative reception.

The Economic Times lauded the film, giving it 4½ stars out of 5 and writing that the film is pretty much the most engaging and authentic sequel to come out of Bollywood in recent memory. Rohit Vats of The Hindustan Times wrote, "Rock On 2 might not have a strong conflict in the storyline, but it definitely works as the narrative of a unique camaraderie among the boys."
