= The Day God Walked Away =

2009 Franco-Belgian drama film

Nirere Shanel
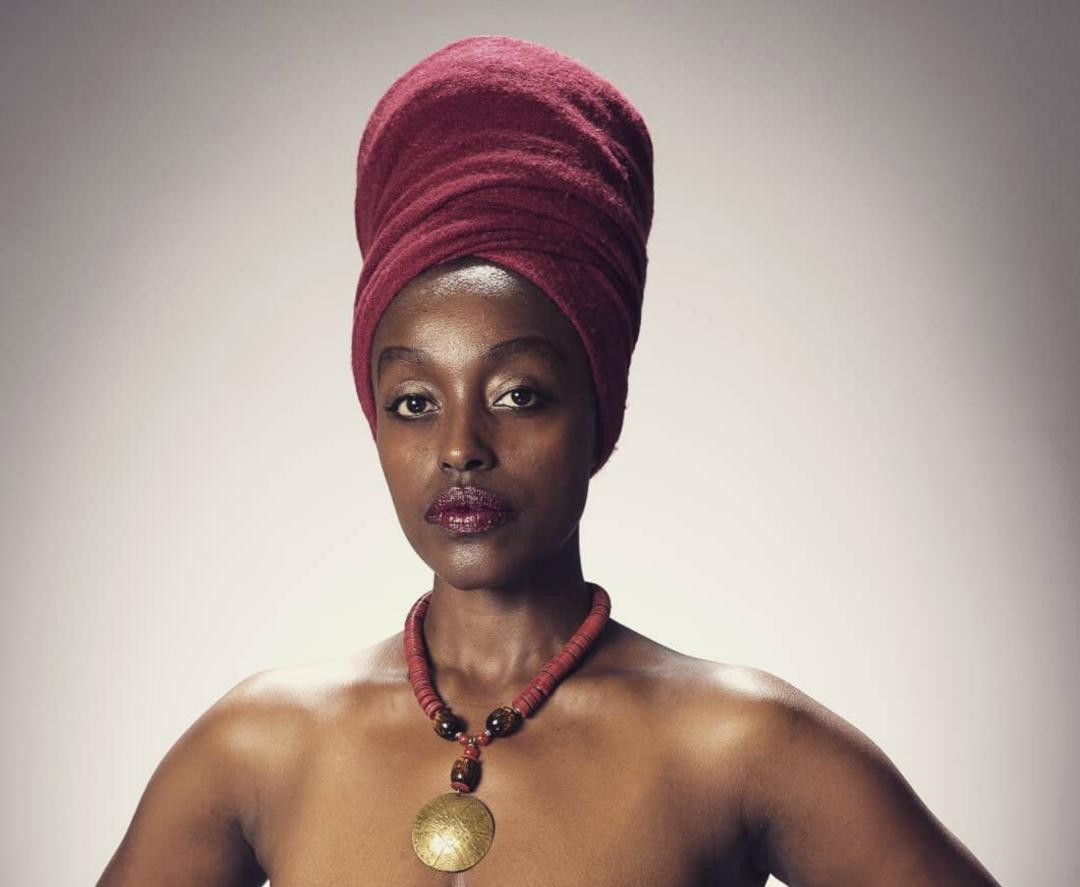
- Nirere Shanel

The Day God Walked Away is a 1 October 2009 Franco-Belgian drama film on the fate of women in the 1994 Rwandan genocide. Currently known as the genocide against Tutsi, this was confirmed officially when the United Nations General Assembly designated 7 April as the international Day of reflection on the 1994 Genocide against Tutsi in Rwanda. The drama was directed by Philippe Van Leeuw

== Plot ==
Jacqueline is a domestic worker from the Tutsi minority working for a Belgian family in Rwanda. Since the family is being evacuated by the UN, the only place they can hide is in the attic. The entire house is looted while acts of violence against the Tutsi can be heard outside. Jacqueline risks her life while she manages to escape. Arriving in her own house, she finds her two children murdered. She flees to take refuge in the jungle.

On the riverbank she finds a wounded man. She cleans his wounds and gives him water, and they make food together. Jacqueline is seen by a group of men in the woods. She saves herself by getting into a pond, but a young man is waiting on the bank to kill her. Her assailant is killed by the wounded man and he rescues Jacqueline from the pool. The wounded man tries to build a shelter in the jungle but Jacqueline destroys it, and runs to the village where she collapses.

The young mother discovers her children's lifeless bodies among the corpses. Driven from her village and hunted like an animal she takes refuge in the forest. The movie was shot in Kigali by the cinematographer Marc Konickx

== Cast ==
- Ruth Nirere Shanel as Jacqueline
- Afazali Dewaele as wounded man

== Awards ==
- New Directors Award – San Sebastián International Film Festival.
- Grand Prize – Bratislava International Film Festival, 2009.
- Best Actress Award for Ruth Nirere Shanel – Bratislava International Film Festival, 2009.
- Best Actress Award for Ruth Nirere Shanel – Thessaloniki International Film Festival, 2009.
- Discovery Prize – Festival International du Film Francophone de Namur, 2009.
- FACE Prize (European Union Human Rights Award) – Istanbul IFF 2010.
- Best Film, Best Director, Best Actress for Ruth Nirere Shanel – Nairobi KIFF 2010.
