= Abuse of Weakness =

- Theatrical release poster
- French: Abus de faiblesse
- Directed by: Catherine Breillat
- Screenplay by: Catherine Breillat
- Based on: Abuse of Weakness by Catherine Breillat
- Produced by: Jean-François Lepetit
- Starring: Isabelle Huppert; Kool Shen
- Cinematography: Alain Marcoen
- Edited by: Pascal Chavance
- Music by: Didier Lockwood
- Production companies: Flach Film; Iris Films; Arte France Cinéma; CB Films; uMedia
- Distributed by: Rézo Films (France); Les Films de l'Elysée (Belgium)
- Release dates: 6 September 2013 (TIFF); 12 February 2014 (France); 19 March 2014 (Belgium); 1 December 2016 (Germany)
- Running time: 105 minutes
- Countries: France; Germany; Belgium
- Language: French
- Budget: €4 million
- Box office: $171,660

Abuse of Weakness (French: Abus de faiblesse) is a 2013 semi-autobiographical film written and directed by Catherine Breillat. The film had its world premiere on 6 September 2013 at the Toronto International Film Festival. In the United States, the film was acquired by Strand Releasing and given a release in December 2014. The title derives from a French legal term that may translate as "exploitation of a vulnerable person".

== Plot ==
Maud Shainberg suffers a cerebral hemorrhage that leaves her paralysed on one half of her body. After a year of intense therapy Maud, a director, begins to work on a new project. After seeing an interview with a con man, Vilko Piran, she immediately asks him to star as the lead in her film, about a lower-class man who falls in love with a famous actress, eventually beating her to death. Vilko accepts but insists that he see Maud as much as possible before filming begins.

== Cast ==
- Isabelle Huppert as Maud Schoenberg
- Kool Shen as Vilko Piran
- Laurence Ursino as Andy
- Christophe Sermet as Ezzé
- Ronald Leclercq as Gino
- Fred Lebelge as TV presenter
- Tristan Schotte as Antoine
- Daphné Baiwir as Hortense
- Dimitri Tomsej as Louis
- Nicolas Steil as Louis' father
- Jean-François Lepetit as Jean-Paul

== Production ==
In 2007, Breillat met notorious conman Christophe Rocancourt, and offered him a leading role in a film that she was planning to make, based on her own novel Bad Love, and co-starring Naomi Campbell. Soon after, she gave him €25,000 to write a screenplay titled La vie amoureuse de Christophe Rocancourt (The Love Life of Christophe Rocancourt), and over the next year and a half, would give him loans totalling an additional €678,000. In 2009, a book written by Breillat was published, in which she alleged that Rocancourt had taken advantage of her diminished mental capacity, as she was still recovering from her stroke. The book was entitled Abus de faiblesse, a French legal term usually translated as "abuse of weakness" and was the basis for the movie of the same title.

== Reception ==
Review aggregation website Rotten Tomatoes reported an approval rating of 85%, based on 34 reviews, with an average score of 6.7/10. The site's critics consensus reads, "Abuse of Weakness' fact-based plot proves that truth can be stranger than fiction – and provide grist for compelling character studies." At Metacritic, which assigns a normalized rating out of 100 to reviews from mainstream critics, the film received an average score of 77, based on 16 reviews, indicating "generally favorable reviews".
