= Nancy Bernstein =

American film producer

- Born: September 10, 1960; New York City, New York, U.S.
- Died: September 18, 2015 (aged 55); Los Angeles, California, U.S.
- Occupation: Visual effects producer
- Years active: 1984-2015

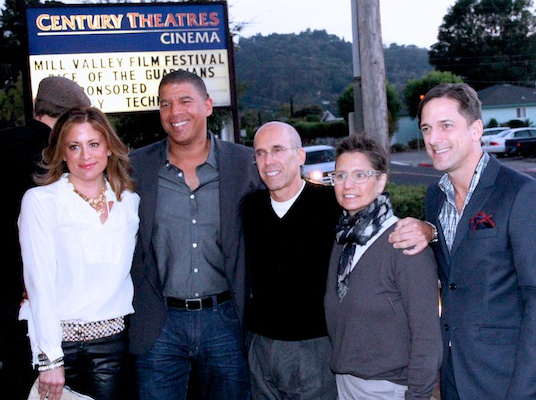
Rise of the Guardians premiere at the Mill Valley Film Festival: Christina Steinberg, producer; Peter Ramsey, director; Jeffrey Katzenberg, DreamWorks Animation's CEO; Nancy Bernstein, producer; Bill Damaschke, DreamWorks Animation's Chief Creative Officer

Nancy Bernstein (September 10, 1960 – September 18, 2015) was an American visual effects producer at Digital Domain and later Head of Production at DreamWorks Animation. She produced DreamWorks' 2012 film Rise of the Guardians.

== Biography ==
Bernstein was born in 1960 and grew up in New York before moving to Los Angeles.

Bernstein's early career included ten years at R/GA, where she worked on films, commercials, and other media. Her first visual effects credit was on Woody Allen's segments in the 1989 New York Stories. She served as their first head of production during the transition to digital production.

Bernstein joined the effects studio Digital Domain in 1997, where her credits included Lake Placid, Red Corner, and Armageddon. As features executive, she oversaw effects for Titanic and What Dreams May Come. In 1999, Bernstein became vice president and general manager of the company, responsible for all their film and theme park effects. She also worked as a visual effects producer on more than thirty films, including X-Men, I, Robot and Lord of the Rings: The Fellowship of the Ring.

In 2005, she joined DreamWorks Animation, producing films, overseeing global initiatives, and becoming head of production. She helped translate the Shrek films to 3D and produced the 2012 film Rise of the Guardians.

=== Death ===
Bernstein was initially diagnosed with colorectal cancer in 2011. She started an organization, Call to Cure, to raise awareness of the disease funds for research. She died on September 18, 2015, after the stage IV cancer metastasized to her lungs. Bernstein was 55 and left behind a wife and daughter. DreamWorks Animation's Kung Fu Panda 3 was dedicated to her memory.
