= Kool Shen =

French rapper, actor, and producer

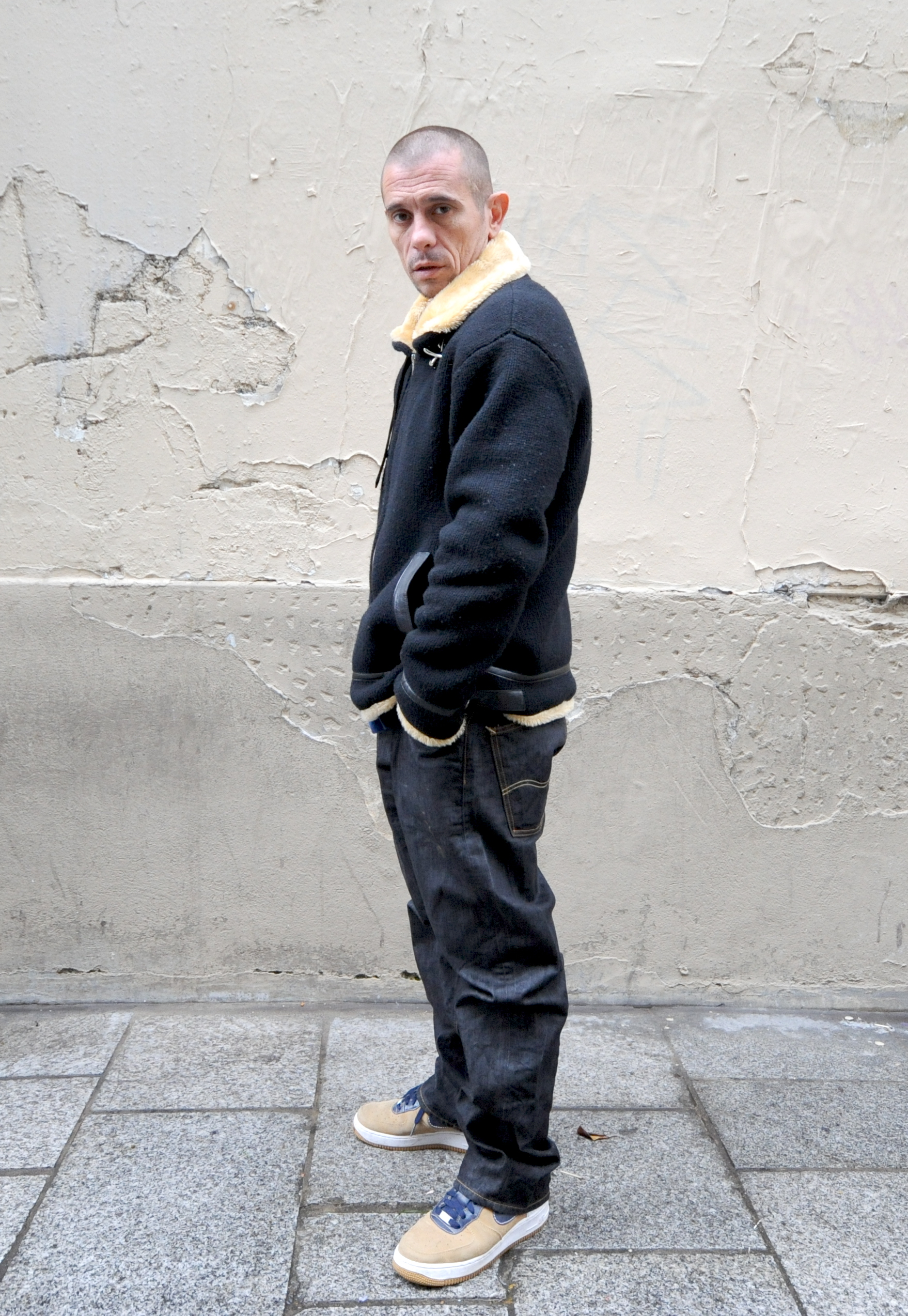
- Born: Bruno Lopes; 9 February 1966 (age 59); Saint-Denis, Paris, France
- Occupations: Rapper, actor, producer
- Years active: 1989–present

Bruno Lopes (French: [bʁyno lɔpɛz], Portuguese: [ˈbɾunu ˈlɔpɨʃ]; born 9 February 1966), better known as Kool Shen, is a French rapper, actor and producer, with Portuguese and Breton origins. He is also a break dancer and a graffiti artist. He is a co-founder of Suprême NTM and one of the major figures of French rap. He was featured on Enhancer's album Electrochoc in the song "Hot".

== Olympique Lyonnais shirt ==
On 2 November 2009, it was announced by French football club Olympique Lyonnais (OL), in collaboration with Betclic and Universal Music, that Kool Shen's name would feature on the team's shirt in a match against league rivals Olympique de Marseille (OM) the following week. It was the first time that a musical artist's album was promoted on a football shirt. OL and OM went on to play out a memorable 5–5 draw in the match.

== Discography ==
- Dernier round (2005)
- Kool Shen – Live (2005)
- Crise de conscience (2009)
- Sur le fil du rasoir (2016)

== Music videos ==
- 1998 : "That's my people".
- 2000 : "United we stand" (feat Toy). Directed by J.G. Biggs
- 2002 : "Are You Ready?" (feat Toy). Directed by J.G. Biggs
- 2004 : "Qui suis-je?" (actors: Samuel Le Bihan & Jo Prestia). Directed by J.G. Biggs.
- 2004 : "II shoot IV my people" (feat Big Ali) Directed by J.G. Biggs.
- 2004 : "Un ange dans le ciel". Directed by J.G. Biggs.
- 2005 : "L'avenir est à nous" (feat Rohff & Dadoo). (actor: Tchéky Karyo) Directed by J.G. Biggs.
- 2005 : "That's my people (live)" (feat Sinik & Kery James) Directed by J.G. Biggs.
- 2006 : "HOT" (with Enhancer & David Banner) Directed by HK corp.
- 2009 : "J'reviens" (feat JoeyStarr) (Actor : Philippe Nahon)
- 2009 : "C'est bouillant" (with Salif)

== Filmography ==
Year	Title	Role	Notes
1998	Qui paiera les dégâts?	The Dealer	Short film
2000	Old School	Jean-Louis	
2000	Elie annonce Semoun		Video
2003	The Dope	Lord Fatal	
2005	Au petit matin		Short film
2008	J'reviens	Himself	Short film
2013	Abuse of Weakness	Vilko Piran	
2014	Paris	Sacha	TV series
2016	Heal the Living	Vincent	
2020	Spiral	Ange Cisco dit Cisco	TV series
