= Daphné Baiwir =

Belgian documentarist and actress

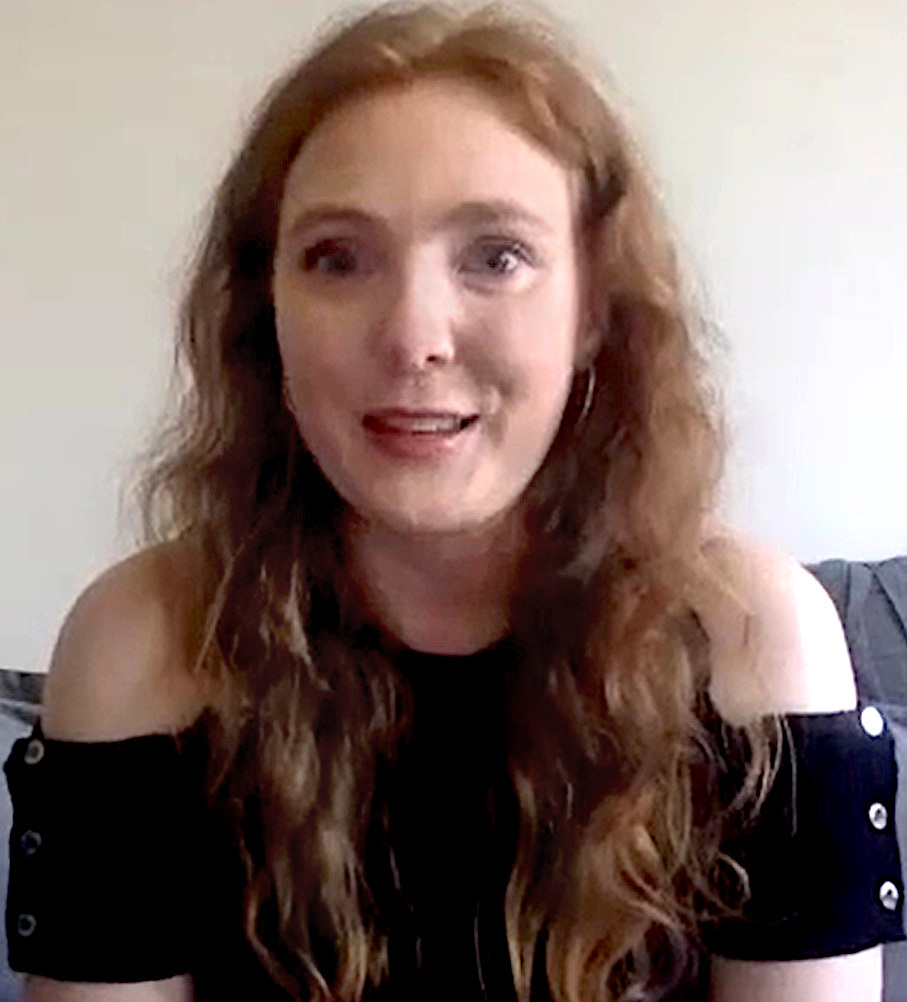
- Baiwir in 2022
- Born: 18 July 1992 (age 33); Belgium
- Occupations: Filmmaker screenwriter model

Daphné Baiwir (born 18 July 1992) is a Belgian documentarist, actress, screenwriter, and former model.

== Life and career ==
Baiwir started her career as a model at just 3 years old; as a model, her collaborations include Christian Lacroix and Sonia Rykiel. She made her acting debut on stage at 7 years old. After appearing in several films and TV-series, she made her directorial debut with Devant les barreaux, a documentary about the everyday life of the officers at the Lantin prison. Her documentary The Rebellious Olivia de Havilland was screened at the 2021 Cannes Film Festival. In 2022, she directed a documentary about film and television adaptations of Stephen King's works, King on Screen. Her 2023 film Le Film pro nazi d'Hitchcock premiered at the 80th edition of the Venice Film Festival.

== Selected filmography ==
Director

- Devant les barreaux (2013)
- Deauville et le rêve américain (2019)
- The Rebellious Olivia de Havilland (Olivia de Havilland, L'insoumise, 2021)
- King on Screen (2022)
- Hitchcock's Pro-Nazi Film? (Le Film pro nazi d'Hitchcock, 2023)

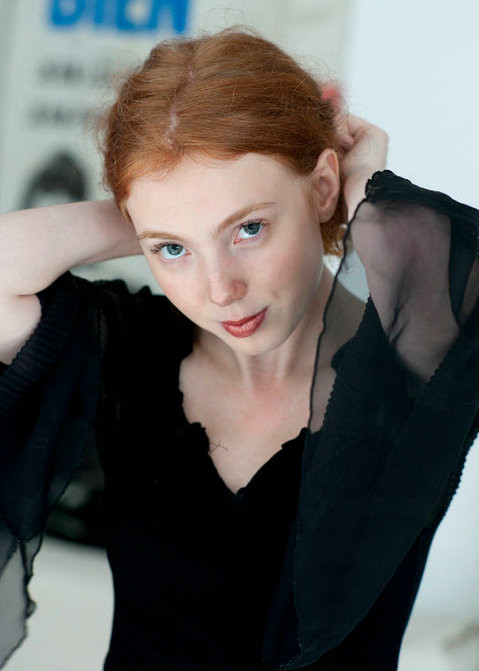
Daphné Baiwir in 2013

Actress

- Monsieur Batignole (2002, directed by Gérard Jugnot)
- Ordo (2004, directed by Laurence Ferreira Barbosa)
- Bluebeard (2009, directed by Catherine Breillat)
- Abuse of Weakness (2013, directed by Catherine Breillat)
- Homo Faber (2014, directed by Richard Dindo)
