= Auro-3D =

3D audio format

Auro-3D is an immersive 3D audio format developed by the Belgium-based company Auro Technologies.

== Technology ==
It is designed along three layers of sound (surround, height and overhead ceiling), building on the single horizontal layer used in the 5.1 or 7.1 sound format. Auro-3D creates a spatial sound field by adding a height layer around the audience on top of the traditional 2D surround sound system. This additional layer reveals both localized sounds and height reflections complementing the sounds that exist in the lower surround layer. The height information that is captured during recording is mixed into a standard 5.1 surround PCM carrier, and during playback the Auro-3D decoder extracts the originally recorded height channels from this stream.

AuroMax expands on the basic layout used by Auro 11.1 and Auro 13.1 by dividing the side, rear and ceiling channels into "zones", to allow for placement of sound at discrete points along the theatre wall or ceiling as well as within the theatre itself. The principle employed is similar to other object based formats such as Dolby Atmos or DTS:X.

The Auro-3D technology consists of the Auro-3D Engine and a Creative Tool Suite. The engine comprises the Auro-Codec and the Auro-Matic upmixing algorithm to convert legacy content into the Auro-3D format. The Creative Tool Suite is a set of plugins that can be used to create native immersive 3D audio content. Auro-3D is fully compatible with all existing production processes and theatre systems, and the format also offers a host of compatibility features such as Single Inventory Distribution (multiple formats are combined in one PCM carrier) and full DCI compliancy.

In 2019, Auro published the Auro-Cx format, which can be used for streaming applications.

== Listening formats ==
Auro-3D comes in a variety of listening formats that are compliant with market standards:

Home Theater (Small Rooms): Auro 9.1, Auro 10.1 (with added Top Ceiling channel, the so-called "Voice Of God")

Theater (Large Rooms): Auro 11.1 (with added Front Height Center channel), Auro 13.1 (with added Left Rear Surround & Right Rear Surround channel), AuroMax 22.1, AuroMax 26.1 (allowing placement of objects)

3D Over Headphones: A format designed to capture the spatial effect of Auro-3D in a portable environment for personal listening

== History ==
The Auro-3D concept and formats were developed in 2005 by Wilfried Van Baelen, CEO and founder of Galaxy Studios and Auro Technologies. The format was officially introduced to the public at the AES Convention 2006 in Paris (20–23 May) and San Francisco (6–8 October) during the workshop "Surround with Height Channels". The first speaker layouts presented here were Auro 9.1 and Auro 10.1 (which added an overhead top speaker).

In October 2010, at the Spatial Audio Convention in Tokyo, the cinematic formats Auro 11.1 and Auro 13.1 as well as the Auro-Codec and Creative Tool Suite were launched. In 2011 a partnership was struck with the Belgian display hardware manufacturer Barco to incorporate Auro-3D in their cinema hardware setup, and in the same year the first installations of Auro 11.1 were deployed. In October 2011, it was announced that Lucasfilm Ltd.'s Red Tails would be the first major motion picture released in the Auro 11.1 format. The first Indian film to use Auto 3D was Vishwaroopam (2013). On 1 November 2012, it was announced that DreamWorks Animation SKG will mix 15 of their upcoming features in the Auro 11.1 format. The first animated film in Auro 11.1 was Rise of the Guardians which was released in November 2012. Subsequently, also The Croods and Turbo were mixed and released in the format, as well as all subsequent DreamWorks Animation films.

Barco, Auro Technologies and audio technology developer DTS made the announcement that they would join forces to support an open standard for immersive object-based cinema sound at CinemaCon 2013. This statement was issued in response to the cinema exhibitor requirements for immersive sound technologies from the National Association of Theatre Owners and the International Union of Cinemas. In September 2013 an agreement was signed with Datasat Digital Entertainment to integrate the format in their range of high-end consumer audio processors. The Datasat LS10 audio processor featuring Auro-3D was presented to the public at ISE 2014.

In 2015, Barco and Auro Technologies debuted the AuroMax format, with 23 or 26 channels available. The increased number of channels allows for sounds to be encoded as "objects" and similarly moved around the auditorium as Dolby Atmos and DTS:X.
