= King on Screen =

- Film poster
- Directed by: Daphné Baiwir
- Produced by: Sebastien Cruz
- Cinematography: Marc Koninckx
- Music by: Nicholas Pike
- Release date: 2022

King on Screen is a 2022 French-Belgian documentary film directed by Daphné Baiwir. It analyzes the film and television adaptations of Stephen King's works through interviews to directors, screenwriters and actors involved in those projects.

== Interviewees ==
- Peter Askin
- Dan Attias
- Craig R. Baxley
- Josh Boone
- James Caan
- David Carson
- Frank Darabont
- Jeffrey DeMunn
- Mike Flanagan
- Mick Garris
- Taylor Hackford
- Scott Hicks
- Amy Irving
- Fraser C. Heston
- Mikael Håfström
- John Harrison
- Zak Hilditch
- Tom Holland
- Mark L. Lester
- Tom McLoughlin
- Vincenzo Natali
- André Øvredal
- Mikael Salomon
- Lewis Teague
- Tod Williams

== Release ==
The film premiered at Fantastic Fest on 24 September 2022.

== Reception ==
On the review aggregator website Rotten Tomatoes, 64% of 28 critics' reviews are positive.
