= Marc Koninckx =

Belgian cinematographer

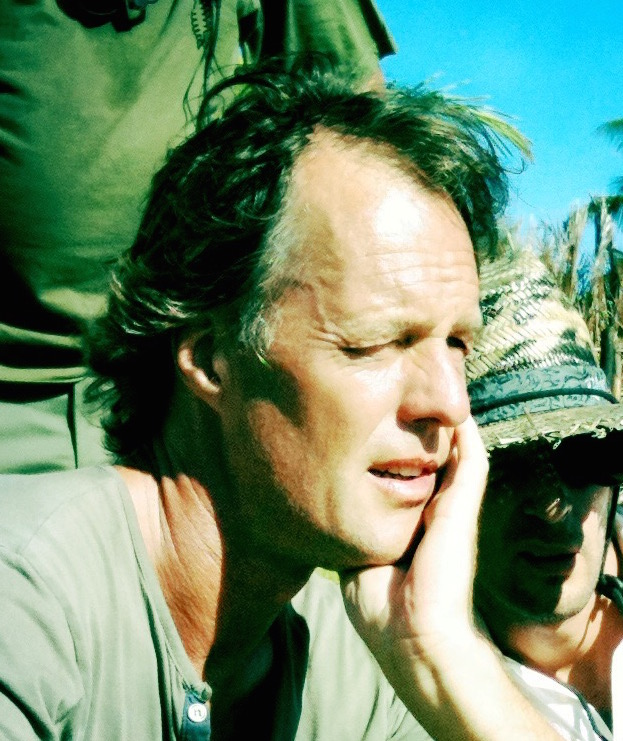
Marc Koninckx

Marc Koninckx is a Belgian cinematographer, member of the A.F.C. (French Society of Cinematographers), member of the S.B.C. (Society of Belgian Cinematographers).

== Biography ==
Koninckx was born in Brussels. After having studied cinema at the R.I.T.C.S. (Brussels), he graduated in 1983. He began his life's work as an assistant, then quickly emerged as a camera & steadicam operator. He collaborated with Louis Malle on Au revoir les enfants, Lewis Teague on The Jewel of the Nile, Cyril Collard sur Les Nuits Fauves, Bertrand Blier on Merci la vie, Roman Polansky on Frantic, Patrice Chéreau on Queen Margot, Claude Berri on Lucie Aubrac.

In 1993, he became 2nd unit director of photography for such films as Stealing Beauty » directed by Bernardo Bertolucci, A Far Off Place directed by Mikael Salomon, French Kiss directed by Lawrence Kasdan and The Ninth Gate » directed by Roman Polansky

Since 1998 Marc Koninckx moved up to 1st unit DOP. In 2008, with the film Johnny Mad Dog, Prize of Hope at Cannes Film Festival, he participated successfully to make photographic aesthetics an element of the filming process.

The film « The Day God Walked Away » shot in Rwanda, won the Kutxa Prize for the best first film at the San Sebastian International Film Festival 2009. In 2012, Marc was nominated for the Best Light – Prix Lumière CST for « Rebellion » a film by Matthieu Kasovitz. « Zabana » shot in Algeria was a Foreign Film Nominee for the Academy Awards 2012.

Koninckx's work in Tamil film Maryan, released in 2013, earned him critical accolades for capturing contrasting backdrops such as the deserts in Africa and underwater sea in South India. He was nominated for best cinematographer – Vijay Awards.

== Filmography ==
Feature Films
Year	Film	Language	Notes
1985	Permeke	Belgian	Debut
1998	Préférence		
2003	Dreamy Visions		
2004	Le Thé d'Ania		
2006	Les Irréductibles		
2007	Vivantes		
2008	Johnny Mad Dog		
2009	The Day God Walked Away		
2010	Itinéraire Bis		
2010	Rebellion		
2010	Zabana!		
2013	Maryan	Tamil	
2016	Rock On 2	Hindi	
2016	Le Viol		
2017	Mystère Place Vendôme		
2018	The Hook Up Plan		
2018	Mystère à la Sorbonne		
2019	ConneXion intime		
2020	King on Screen		
2022	Demain, si tout va bien		
2023	Ukraniennes		
2025	KHOJ		

- 2014–2015 : Hôtel de la plage
- 2007 : Sa raison d'être (TV)
- 2006 : La Reine Sylvie (TV)
- 2005 : Le Triporteur de Belleville (TV)
- 2004 : La Nourrice (TV)
- 2003 : Les Bottes (TV)
- 2003 : Le Voyages de la grande-duchesse (TV)
- 2002 : Y a pas d'âge pour s'aimer (TV)
- 2001 : Vent de poussières (TV)
- 1999 : Mort d'un conquérant (TV)

Director of photography 2nd Unit, camera operator, steadicam operator

- (1997) Lucie Aubrac (camera operator)
- (1996) Le Bel été / the Glorious Summer,(steadicam operator)
- (1996) Des nouvelles du bon Dieu/ News from the Good Lord (steadicam operator)
- (1996) Beauté Volée/Stealing Beauty, (Director of photography 2nd Unit)(steadicam operator)
- (1996) Beaumarchais, l'insolent/ Beaumarchais the Scoundrel (steadicam operator)
- (1995) La Cité des enfants perdus/ The City of Lost Children (steadicam operator) )(camera operator)
- (1995) Paris Match /French Kiss (Director of photography 2nd Unit)
- (1995) Une femme française/ A French Woman (steadicam operator)
- (1994) Un indien dans la ville/ Little Indian, Big City (steadicam operator)
- (1994) La Machine/ The Machine, (camera operator)
- (1994) Le Colonel Chabert, (camera operator)
- (1994) La Fille de d'Artagnan/ The Daughter of D'Artagnan, (steadicam operator) )
- (1994) Casque bleu/ Blue Helmet (steadicam operator) )
- (1994) La Reine Margot/ Queen Margot, (camera operator)
- (1993) Germinal (steadicam operator) (2nd camera operator)
- (1993) L'Ombre du doute/ Shadow of a Doubt, (steadicam operator)
- (1993) A Far Off Place (Director of photography 2nd Unit)
- (1993) Les Visiteurs/ The Visitors, (steadicam operator) )
- (1992) À demain/ See You Tomorrow (steadicam operator) )
- (1992) Fatale/Damage (camera operator: French crew) (steadicam operator: French crew)
- (1992) La Fille de l'air/ The Girl in the Air, (steadicam operator)
- (1992) Les Nuits fauves/ Savage Nights, (steadicam operator)
- (1992) Sur la terre comme au ciel/ In Heaven as on Earth (steadicam operator)
- (1992) Après l'amour/ Love After Love (steadicam operator)
- (1992) La Belle histoire/ The Beautiful Story, (steadicam operator)
- (1991) La Totale!/ The Jackpot, (opérateur steadicam)
- (1991) Les Amants du Pont-Neuf/ The Lovers on the Bridge, (steadicam operator)
- (1991) Simple mortel/ A Mere Mortal (steadicam operator)
- (1991) Aujourd'hui peut-être/ A Day to Remember (camera operator)
- (1991) Merci la vie/ Thanks for Life (steadicam operator)
- (1991) L’Opération Corned-Beef, (steadicam operator)
- (1990) Henry & June, (steadicam operator)
- (1990) The Man Inside (steadicam operator)
- (1990) Promotion canapé (steadicam operator)
- (1989) Mahabharata (steadicam operator)
- (1989) Silence Like Glass (steadicam operator)
- (1989) Force majeure (steadicam operator)
- (1989) Cinq jours en juin (steadicam operator)
- (1989) Je suis le seigneur du château (steadicam operator)
- (1988) To Kill a Priest (steadicam operator)
- (1988) Jaune revolver (steadicam operator)
- (1988) Frantic (steadicam operator) )
- (1987) Au revoir les enfants (steadicam operator)
- (1987) Mascara (camera operator)
- (1986) The Assault, (steadicam operator)
- (1985) The Jewel of the Nile (camera operator)
- (1985) Flesh+Blood (camera operator)(steadicam operator)
