= Auro 11.1 =

Cinematic speaker layout

Auro 11.1 logo

Auro 11.1 is one of the cinematic speaker layouts of the Auro-3D format, invented in 2005 by Wilfried Van Baelen (CEO Auro Technologies, CEO Galaxy Studios).

== Working ==
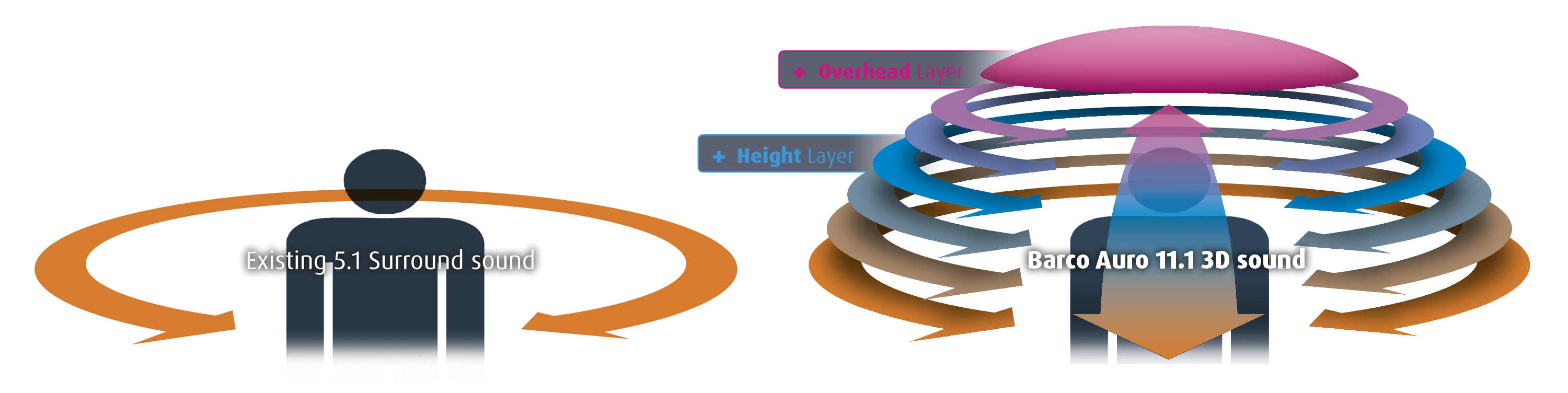
Comparison of 5.1 (left) and Auro 11.1 (right)

The Auro 11.1 cinema sound format is an extension of the existing 5.1 surround sound format by incorporating height and overhead channels to allow for placement and panning of sound in the horizontal and vertical axis.

Auro 11.1 is a channel-based system and thus differs in capability compared to competing formats such as Dolby Atmos and DTS:X. The height layer allows for placement of background reflections and reverberations observed in nature as well as allowing for smooth panning from the base layer to the ceiling. However, the lack of a surround back-channel restricts panning due to lack of differentiation between the side and rear sector. Similarly, the use of arrays for surround and overhead channel also disallows pinpoint localization of sound along the walls as well as within the theater space. The AuroMax format extends the capabilities of Auro 11.1 to approach Dolby Atmos and DTS:X.

The system uses Auro-3D Octopus codec, which allows the 12 channels to be compressed into 6 channels by utilizing the least significant bits for the additional channels and its metadata. This allows Auro 11.1 to be played as 5.1 in the absence of a decoder.

The first Auro 11.1 system was installed in May 2010 in Galaxy Studios and the format was launched at the spatial audio conference (AES) in October 2010 in Tokyo. By December 2014, 550 installations were committed and installed in theaters worldwide.

The first movie mixed in Auro 11.1 was Lucasfilm's Red Tails, released in January 2012. On 1 November 2012, DreamWorks Animation announced that it would release 15 of its upcoming movies in the Auro 11.1 format.

== Products ==
The Auro 11.1 technological suite contains the Auro-Codec encoding - decoding plugins, Auro-Matic upmixer plugin, and the Auro-Panner plugin.

=== The Auro 11.1 decoder ===
The Auro 11.1 decoder is a firmware based solution compatible with Doremi cinema servers, that activates once the metadata in an Auro 11.1 stream is detected. Once decoded, the media block routes the channels to the AP24^{3D} audio processor.

=== AP24^{3D} audio processor ===
The AP24^{3D} audio processor renders the streams received from the decoder and allows switching between 6 and 12 channel playback automatically or upmixing to Auro 11.1 layout.

== Films released in Auro 11.1 ==
Title	Release date	Language
Red Tails	January 20, 2012	English
Madame Butterfly 3D	March 5, 2012	
Rise of the Guardians	November 21, 2012	English
Het Bombardement	December 20, 2012	Dutch
Vishwaroopam	January 25, 2013	Tamil, Hindi
Ameerin Aadhi Bhagavan	February 22, 2013	Tamil
Oz the Great and Powerful	March 8, 2013	English
The Croods	March 22, 2013	English
Shadow	April 27, 2013	Telugu
Turbo	July 17, 2013	English
Mr. Go	July 17, 2013	Korean, Japanese, Chinese
Maryan	July 19, 2013	Tamil
Elysium	August 9, 2013	English
Diana	September 20, 2013	English
Young Detective Dee: Rise of the Sea Dragon	September 28, 2013	Mandarin
Stalingrad	October 10, 2013	Russian, German
Sutta Kadhai	October 25, 2013	Tamil
Ender's Game	November 1, 2013	English
Vidiyum Munn	November 29, 2013	Tamil
The Adventurer: Curse of the Midas Box	January 10, 2014	English
1: Nenokkadine	January 10, 2014	Telugu
Jilla	January 10, 2014	Tamil
I, Frankenstein	January 24, 2014	English
Swapaanam	February 27, 2014	Malayalam
Mr. Peabody & Sherman	March 7, 2014	English
D-Day: Normandy 1944	March 2014	
Oculus	April 11, 2014	English
Damaal Dumeel	April 18, 2014	Tamil
Kaanchi: The Unbreakable	April 25, 2014	Hindi
The Amazing Spider-Man 2	May 2, 2014	English
Fool Cool Rock! ONE OK ROCK Documentary Film	May 16, 2014	Japanese, English
Kochadaiiyaan	May 22, 2014	Tamil
How to Train Your Dragon 2	June 20, 2014	English
Transformers: Age of Extinction	June 27, 2014	English
Arima Nambi	July 4, 2014	Tamil
Ramanujam	July 11, 2014	Tamil
1:13:7 Ek Tera Saat	July 13, 2014	Hindi
The House That Never Dies	July 18, 2014	Mandarin
Lucy	July 25, 2014	English
Alludu Seenu	July 25, 2014	Telugu
Teenage Mutant Ninja Turtles	August 8, 2014	English
Into the Storm	August 8, 2014	English
Kathai Thiraikathai Vasanam Iyakkam	August 15, 2014	Tamil
The Expendables 3	August 15, 2014	English
Aindhaam Thalaimurai Sidha Vaidhiya Sigamani	August 22, 2014	Tamil
Peruchazhi	August 29, 2014	Malayalam
The Maze Runner	September 19, 2014	English
Black & White: The Dawn of Justice	October 1, 2014	Taiwanese
John Wick	October 24, 2014	English
Onnumae Puriyalai	October 2014	Tamil
Chaar Sahibzaade	November 6, 2014	Punjabi
The King's Surrender	November 13, 2014	German
The Hunger Games: Mockingjay - Part 1	November 21, 2014	English
Vizhi Moodi Yosithaal	November 21, 2014	Tamil
Gollu Aur Pappu	November 21, 2014	Hindi
Penguins of Madagascar	November 26, 2014	English
Aaah	November 28, 2014	Tamil
Bowling Balls	December 17, 2014	Tamil
The Taking of Tiger Mountain	December 23, 2014	Mandarin
Kappal	December 25, 2014	Tamil
Unbroken	December 25, 2014	English
Freedom	2014	Hindi
Mayapuri	January 9, 2015	Malayalam
JK Enum Nanbanin Vaazhkai	January 15, 2015	Tamil, Telugu
American Sniper	January 16, 2015	English
Isai	January 30, 2015	Tamil
Jupiter Ascending	February 6, 2015	English
From Vegas to Macau II	February 19, 2015	Cantonese, Mandarin
Anegan	February 2015	Tamil
Uttama Villain	February 2015	Tamil
The Divergent Series: Insurgent	March 20, 2015	English
Home	March 27, 2015	English
The Age of Adaline	April 8, 2015	English
Vaaliba Raja	April 29, 2015	Tamil
Monk Comes Down the Mountain	July 3, 2015	Mandarin
Papanasam	July 3, 2015	Tamil
Minions	July 10, 2015	English
Pixels	July 24, 2015	English
Loham	August 20, 2015	Malayalam
American Ultra	August 21, 2015	English
A Tale of Three Cities	August 28, 2015	Mandarin
Maze Runner: The Scorch Trials	September 18, 2015	English
Everest	September 18, 2015	English
Sicario	September 18, 2015	English
The Last Witch Hunter	October 23, 2015	English
The Hunger Games: Mockingjay – Part 2	November 20, 2015	English
In the Heart of the Sea	December 11, 2015	English
Mojin: The Lost Legend	December 18, 2015	English
Mr. Six	December 24, 2015	Mandarin
Kung Fu Panda 3	January 28, 2016	English
Skiptrace	February 15, 2015	English
Flight Crew	April 21, 2016	Russian
28 Panfilovcev	April 2016	Russian
Warcraft	May 25, 2016	English
The Secret Life of Pets	June 24, 2016	English
Ludo	June 2016	Tamil
The Legend of Tarzan	July 1, 2016	English
Ghostbusters	July 21, 2016	English
Ice Age: Collision Course	July 22, 2016	English
Jason Bourne - China Only	August 23, 2016	English
Inferno	October 12, 2016	English
Trolls	November 4, 2016	English
Sing	December 21, 2016	English
Passengers	December 21, 2016	English
An Invitation	2016	Russian
TAKE2	January 26, 2017	Mandarin
Journey to the West: The Demons Strike Back	January 28, 2017	Mandarin
Fifty Shades Darker	February 10, 2017	English
The Great Wall	February 17, 2017	English
The Boss Baby	March 31, 2017	English
The Fate of the Furious	April 14, 2017	English
Captain Underpants	June 2, 2017	English
The Mummy	June 9, 2017	English
Spider-Man: Homecoming	July 6, 2017	English
The Dark Tower	August 4, 2017	English
Blade Runner 2049	October 6, 2017	English
Paddington 2	November 10, 2017	English
Justice League	November 17, 2017	English
Coco	November 22, 2017	English
Jumanji: Welcome to the Jungle	December 20, 2017	English
Maze Runner: The Death Cure	January 26, 2018	English
Fifty Shades Freed	February 9, 2018	English
Black Panther	February 16, 2018	English
Tomb Raider	March 16, 2018	English
Pacific Rim Uprising	March 23, 2018	English
Ready Player One	March 29, 2018	English
Avengers: Infinity War	April 27, 2018	English
Solo: A Star Wars Story	May 25, 2018	English
Incredibles 2	June 15, 2018	English
Jurassic World: Fallen Kingdom	June 22, 2018	English
Ant-Man and the Wasp	July 6, 2018	English
Mission: Impossible – Fallout	July 27, 2018	English
First Man	October 12, 2018	English
Avengers: Endgame	April 26, 2019	English
Valimai	February 24, 2022	Tamil
