= Rise of the Guardians =

2012 film by Peter Ramsey

- Theatrical release poster
- Directed by: Peter Ramsey
- Screenplay by: David Lindsay-Abaire
- Based on: The Guardians of Childhood and The Man in the Moon by William Joyce
- Produced by: Christina Steinberg; Nancy Bernstein
- Starring: Chris Pine; Alec Baldwin; Jude Law; Isla Fisher; Hugh Jackman
- Cinematography: Roger Deakins (visual consultant)
- Edited by: Joyce Arrastia
- Music by: Alexandre Desplat
- Production company: DreamWorks Animation
- Distributed by: Paramount Pictures (Note: In July 2014, the film's distribution rights were purchased by DreamWorks Animation from Paramount Pictures and transferred to 20th Century Fox before reverting to Universal Pictures in 2018 following NBCUniversal's acquisition of DreamWorks Animation in 2016.)
- Release dates: October 10, 2012 (Mill Valley Film Festival); November 21, 2012 (United States)
- Running time: 97 minutes
- Country: United States
- Language: English
- Budget: $145 million
- Box office: $306.9 million

Rise of the Guardians is a 2012 American animated fantasy action film directed by Peter Ramsey and written by David Lindsay-Abaire, based on the book series The Guardians of Childhood and the short film The Man in the Moon by William Joyce. Produced by DreamWorks Animation, the film stars the voices of Chris Pine, Alec Baldwin, Jude Law, Isla Fisher, and Hugh Jackman. The film tells a story about Guardians Santa Claus (Baldwin), the Tooth Fairy (Fisher), the Easter Bunny (Jackman) and the Sandman, who enlist Jack Frost (Pine) to stop Pitch Black (Law) from engulfing the world in darkness in a fight of dreams.

Rise of the Guardians premiered at the Mill Valley Film Festival on October 10, 2012, and was theatrically released in the United States by Paramount Pictures on November 21, and received mixed-to-positive reviews from critics. Despite grossing $306.9 million worldwide against a budget of $145 million, the film was deemed a box-office failure, as it lost the studio an estimated $87 million due to marketing and distribution costs. It was nominated for the Golden Globe Award for Best Animated Feature Film and the Annie Award for Best Animated Feature.

The film was also DreamWorks Animation’s final film to be distributed by Paramount Pictures, as their six-year distribution deal ended afterwards.

== Plot ==
Jack Frost emerges from a frozen pond with amnesia and finds himself invisible to the mortal realm. While he knows the Man in the Moon played a role in his transformation, the Man does not tell him why he has been changed. Three centuries later, Nicholas St. North learns of the return of Pitch Black, who threatens to plague children with nightmares. North rallies his fellow Guardians, E. Aster Bunnymund, Sanderson Mansnoozie, and Toothiana, and they discover that Jack has been chosen to join their ranks. Jack is kidnapped by Bunny and transported to the North Pole, where he learns from North that every Guardian has a "center", something they foster in children. Jack knows nothing of his center and resists the call to become a Guardian.

Meanwhile, North receives a message from Toothiana that her palace is under attack. The Guardians and Jack Frost manage to chase away Pitch, but not before Pitch kidnaps Tooth's subordinate fairies and steals all of the teeth, weakening children's belief in Tooth. Jack learns that every baby tooth holds the childhood memories of its owner, and may help him find out more about his past, motivating him to help Toothiana. To counter Pitch's plan, the other Guardians and Jack embark on a mission to collect teeth from children themselves. In their quest, they visit Jamie Bennett, a young boy who, still clinging to his belief, sees all of them except for Jack. On their way back to the North Pole, Pitch's Nightmares attack the Guardians and Sandy is killed.

With Easter approaching, the Guardians travel to Bunny's Warren and assist in the egg-coloring preparations. A mysterious voice lures Jack into Pitch's lair, where he finds his teeth. Pitch distracts Jack long enough for the Nightmares to destroy all the Easter eggs, causing children to stop believing in Bunny. Ashamed, Jack flees to Antarctica, where Pitch breaks his magic staff and throws him into a chasm. Unlocking the memories within his teeth, Jack learns that he was once a mortal boy who died saving his sister from the frozen pond that he awakened from at the film's start, which caused the Man in the Moon to choose him as a Guardian. Inspired, he repairs his staff and rescues the kidnapped fairies.

Thanks to Pitch, every child in the world has stopped believing except Jamie, drastically weakening the Guardians. Finding Jamie's belief wavering, Jack makes it snow in his bedroom, restoring his faith in the Guardians and making Jamie the first person to believe in him. Jack realizes that his center is fun and uses it to gather Jamie's friends, play, and diminish their fear, which bolsters the Guardians and resurrects Sandy. The children's dreams prove stronger than the Nightmares, who turn on Pitch and drag him to the underworld. The Guardians celebrate their victory and Jack accepts his place as the Guardian of Fun.

== Voice cast ==
- Chris Pine as Jack Frost: the Spirit of Winter. He is a teenage hellion who enjoys creating mischief and has no interest in being bound by rules or obligations; he just wants to use his staff to spread his winter magic for the sake of fun, but also wants to be believed in. Via his staff, he possesses potent cryokinesis. At the end of the film, Jack became the Guardian of Fun.
- Jude Law as Pitch Black / Boogeyman, the Nightmare King. He has dark hair and wears a black cloak. Despite being the literal embodiment of terror, at the resolution, he is scared of his own nightmares after being forgotten.
- Alec Baldwin as Nicholas St. North / Santa Claus, the leader of the Guardians, and the Guardian of Wonder. He lives at the North Pole in the Ice Castle and is served by loyal North Pole natives, the Yetis (who built the castle and workshop) and the Christmas Elves. He has a Russian accent/culture persona, resembling Ded Moroz.
- Isla Fisher as Toothiana / Tooth Fairy, called Tooth for short, the Guardian of Memories. Tooth is part human and part hummingbird, loosely resembling a Kinnari. Assisted by mice and mini fairies that are split-off extensions of herself, she collects the children's teeth, which hold their most precious memories. Tooth stores them in her palace and returns memories when they are needed the most.
- Hugh Jackman as E. Aster Bunnymund / Easter Bunny, called Bunny for short, the keeper and bringer of Easter eggs and Guardian of Hope. He shares Jackman's Australian accent.
- Dakota Goyo as Jamie Bennett, a child who has not given up on believing in the Guardians.
- Georgie Grieve as Sophie Bennett, Jamie's little sister
- Jacob Bertrand as Monty
- Dominique Grund as Cupcake
- Olivia Mattingly as Mary Frost, Jack's sister

Additionally, Sandman or "Sandy", the Guardian of Dreams and the oldest of the Guardians, appears, but does not speak, and instead he communicates through sand images that he conjures above his head.

== Production ==
In 2005, William Joyce and Reel FX launched a joint venture, Aimesworth Amusements, to produce CG-animated feature films, one of which was set to be The Guardians of Childhood, based on Joyce's idea. The film was not realized, but they did create a short animated film, The Man in the Moon, directed by Joyce, which introduced the Guardians idea, and served as an inspiration for the film.

Early in 2008, Joyce sold the film rights to DreamWorks Animation, after the studio assured him it would respect his vision for the characters and that he would be involved with the creative process. In November 2009, it was revealed that DreamWorks had hired Peter Ramsey to make his feature debut as director of what was then titled The Guardians, and playwright David Lindsay-Abaire to write the script, Lindsay-Abaire previously co-wrote the screenplay for Robots, which Joyce previously produced. The next month, Leonardo DiCaprio was announced to make his animated feature film debut as the lead character of the film—tentatively titled The Guardians—Jack Frost. DiCaprio would later leave the project for undisclosed reasons. Joyce acted as a co-director for the first few years, but left this position after the death of his daughter Mary Katherine, who died from complications relating to her brain cancer positive diagnosis in May 2010. Joyce continued to work on the film only as an executive producer, while Ramsey took the helm solo as a full-time director, making him the first African American to direct a big-budget CG animated film as well as making it one of the first DreamWorks films to have only one director instead of two and not have a co-director. As with some previous DreamWorks films, Guillermo del Toro came on board to join Joyce as an executive producer. Present almost from the beginning, he was able to help shape the story, character design, theme and structure of the film. He said he was proud that the filmmakers were making parts of the film "dark and moody and poetic," and expressed hope this might "set a different tone for family movies, for entertainment movies." The final title, Rise of the Guardians was announced in early 2011, along with the first cast.

Roger Deakins, the cinematographer who had already worked on a previous DreamWorks film, How to Train Your Dragon, advised on the lighting to achieve its real look. He selected photographic references for color keys, and during the production gave notes on contrast, saturation, depth of field and light intensity. The film contains a lot of special effects, particularly the volumetric particles for depicting Sandman and Pitch. For this, DreamWorks Animation developed OpenVDB, a more efficient tool and format for manipulating and storing volume data, like smoke and other amorphous materials. OpenVDB had been already used on Puss in Boots and Madagascar 3: Europe's Most Wanted, and was released in August 2012 for free as an open-source project with a hope to become an industry standard.

Although the film is based on Joyce's book series, it contains differences from the books. The book series, begun in 2011, explains the origins of the characters, while the film takes place about 300 years after the books, and shows how the characters function in present time. Joyce explained, "Because I don't want people to read the book and then go see the movie and go, 'Oh, I like the book better,' and I also didn't want them to know what happens in the movie. And I also knew that during the progress of film production, a lot of things can change. So I wanted to have a sort of distance, so we were able to invoke the books and use them to help us figure out the world of the movie, but I didn't want them to be openly competitive to each other." The idea for the Guardians came from Joyce's daughter, who asked him "if he thought Santa Claus had ever met the Easter Bunny." The film includes a dedication to her, as well a song, "Still Dream," sung over the end credits.

Originally, the film was set to be released on November 2, 2012, but DreamWorks Animation pushed the film to November 21, 2012, to avoid competition with Pixar's upcoming film Monsters University, which in turn had been pushed to November 2, 2012, to avoid competition with The Twilight Saga: Breaking Dawn – Part 2. Monsters University was then pushed to June 21, 2013, with Disney's Wreck-It Ralph taking its place.

== Music ==
French composer Alexandre Desplat composed the original music for the film, which was released on November 13, 2012, by Varèse Sarabande. The score was recorded in London at Abbey Road Studios and Air Studios, and performed by the London Symphony Orchestra, with a choral contribution by London Voices. David Lindsay-Abaire wrote the lyrics for the end-credit song, "Still Dream", which was performed by soprano Renée Fleming. Stravinsky's "Firebird Suite" can also be heard during the scene where North first appears. This film marks the first time that a DreamWorks Animation film has not been composed or have any involvement from Hans Zimmer or a member of his Remote Control Productions family of composers (mainly John Powell, Henry Jackman, Lorne Balfe, Harry Gregson-Williams or his brother Rupert Gregson-Williams).

== Release ==
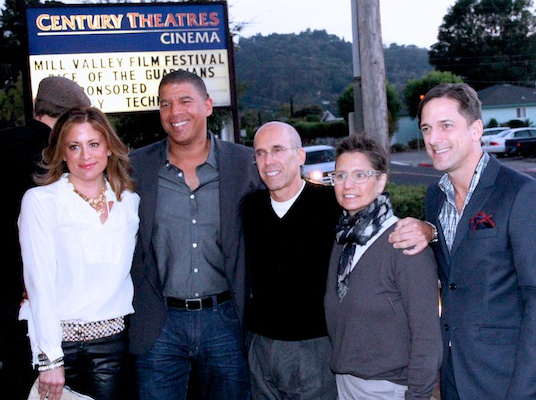
Rise of the Guardians premiere at the Mill Valley Film Festival: Christina Steinberg, producer; Peter Ramsey, director; Jeffrey Katzenberg, DreamWorks Animation's CEO; Nancy Bernstein, producer; Bill Damaschke, DreamWorks Animation's Chief Creative Officer

Rise of the Guardians was previously scheduled to be released on November 4, 2011, however, Puss in Boots took over its release date, pushing the film to November 21, 2012. The film had its premiere on October 10, 2012, at The Mill Valley Film Festival in Mill Valley, California, followed by the international premiere at The International Rome Film Festival on November 13, 2012. Under distribution by Paramount Pictures, the film was released on November 21, 2012, in American theaters. Digitally re-mastered into IMAX 3D, it was shown in limited international and domestic IMAX theaters. It was the second film released in the firm Barco's Auro 11.1 3D audio format, after Red Tails. The film was also shown in Dolby Atmos, a surround sound technology introduced in 2012.

Rise of the Guardians was the last DreamWorks Animation film to be distributed by Paramount Pictures. Starting with The Croods and ending with Captain Underpants: The First Epic Movie, all DreamWorks Animation films would be distributed by 20th Century Fox.

=== Home media ===
Rise of the Guardians was released on Blu-ray (2D and 3D) and DVD on March 12, 2013.

That was the last DreamWorks Animation home media release to be distributed by Paramount Home Entertainment, since 20th Century Fox announced its distribution agreement with DreamWorks Animation a few months before the theatrical release. The film was more successful at home media sales than at the box office, having at the end of the second quarter of 2013 "the highest box office to DVD conversion ratio among major releases." In the first quarter of 2013, it sold 3.2 million home entertainment units worldwide, and in the second quarter 0.9 million units, for a total of 4.1 million units.

It was re-released on DVD on November 5, 2013, and comes with a wind-up marching elf toy. As of October 2014, 5.8 million home entertainment units were sold worldwide. In July 2014, the film's distribution rights were purchased by DreamWorks Animation from Paramount Pictures and transferred to 20th Century Fox. The rights were moved to Universal Pictures in 2018 after the buyout of DreamWorks Animation by Comcast (through NBCUniversal) in 2016. It was re-released on DVD and Blu-ray on June 5, 2018, by Universal Pictures Home Entertainment.

== Reception ==
=== Critical response ===
Rise of the Guardians received mixed-to-positive reviews upon release. On the review aggregator website Rotten Tomatoes, the film has an approval rating of 75% based on 159 reviews, with an average rating of 6.7/10. The website's critical consensus reads: "A sort of Avengers for the elementary school set, Rise of the Guardians is wonderfully animated and briskly paced, but it's only so-so in the storytelling department." Metacritic, which assigns a rating out of 100 top reviews from mainstream critics, calculated a score of 58 based on 37 reviews, which indicates "mixed or average reviews". Audiences polled by CinemaScore gave the film an excellent grade of "A" on an A+ to F scale.

Carrie Rickey of The Philadelphia Inquirer gave the film three and a half stars out of four and found that the film's characters have "a primal familiarity, as though they were developed by a tag team of Maurice Sendak and Walt Disney." Olly Richards of Empire wrote, "It's gorgeously designed, deftly written and frequently laugh-out-loud funny. For child or adult, this is a fantasy to get lost in." The Washington Post's Michael O'Sullivan also gave the film a positive review and said, "Thoughts become things. That's the message of Rise of the Guardians, a charming if slightly dark and cobwebbed animated feature about how believing in something makes it real, or real enough." Roger Ebert of the Chicago Sun-Times gave the film three stars out of four and wrote in his review, "There's an audience for this film. It's not me. I gather younger children will like the breakneck action, the magical ability to fly and the young hero who has tired of only being a name." Though he did say, "Their parents and older siblings may find the 89-minute running time quite long enough."

Todd McCarthy of The Hollywood Reporter called the film "a lively but derivative 3D storybook spree for some unlikely action heroes." Conversely, Justin Chang in Variety said, "Even tots may emerge feeling slightly browbeaten by this colorful, strenuous and hyperactive fantasy, which has moments of charm and beauty but often resembles an exploding toy factory rather than a work of honest enchantment." Joe Morgenstern of The Wall Street Journal found that the film "lacks a resonant center," and that the script, "seems to have been written by committee, with members lobbying for each major character, and the action, set in vast environments all over the map, spreads itself so thin that a surfeit of motion vitiates emotion."

=== Box office ===
Rise of the Guardians was deemed a box-office bomb. It grossed $103.4 million in the United States and Canada, and $203.5 million in other countries, for a worldwide total of $306.9 million.

In North America, the film opened to $32.3 million over its extended five-day weekend, and with $23.8 million over the three-day weekend, it reached fourth place behind The Twilight Saga: Breaking Dawn – Part 2, Skyfall, and Lincoln. The film's opening was the lowest debut for a DreamWorks Animation film since Flushed Away in 2006. While the film grossed more than double of its $145 million budget, it did not turn a profit for DreamWorks Animation due to its high distribution and marketing costs, forcing the studio to take an $87 million write-down. As a result of this combined with other factors, in February 2013, the studio announced it was laying off 350 employees as part of a company-wide restructuring.

=== Accolades ===
Accolades received by Rise of the Guardians
Award	Date of ceremony	Category	Recipient(s)	Result	Ref.
African-American Film Critics Association Awards	February 8, 2013	Best Animation	Rise of the Guardians	Won	
Alliance of Women Film Journalists Awards	January 7, 2013	Best Animated Female	Isla Fisher	Nominated	
American Cinema Editors Awards	February 16, 2013	Best Edited Animated Feature Film	Joyce Arrastia	Nominated	
Annie Awards	February 2, 2013	Best Animated Feature	Rise of the Guardians	Nominated	
Annie Awards	February 2, 2013	Outstanding Achievement for Animated Effects in an Animated Production	Andy Hayes, Carl Hooper, and David Lipton	Won	
Annie Awards	February 2, 2013	Outstanding Achievement for Character Animation in a Feature Production	David Pate	Nominated	
Annie Awards	February 2, 2013	Outstanding Achievement for Character Animation in a Feature Production	Phillppe LeBrun	Nominated	
Annie Awards	February 2, 2013	Outstanding Achievement for Character Animation in a Feature Production	Pierre Perifel	Nominated	
Annie Awards	February 2, 2013	Outstanding Achievement for Editorial in a Feature Production	Joyce Arrastia	Nominated	
Annie Awards	February 2, 2013	Outstanding Achievement for Music in a Feature Production	Alexandre Desplat	Nominated	
Annie Awards	February 2, 2013	Outstanding Achievement for Production Design in an Animated Feature Production	Patrick Hanenberger, Max Boas, Jayee Borcar, Woonyoung Jung, Perry Maple, Peter Maynez, Stan Seo, and Felix Yoon	Nominated	
Annie Awards	February 2, 2013	Outstanding Achievement for Storyboarding in a Feature Production	Johanne Matte	Won	
Annie Awards	February 2, 2013	Outstanding Achievement for Voice Acting in a Feature Production	Jude Law	Nominated	
Black Reel Awards	February 7, 2013	Best Director	Peter Ramsey	Nominated	
BMI Film & TV Awards	May 15, 2013	BMI Film Music Awards	Alexandre Desplat (Note: Also for Argo (2012))	Won	
Cinema Audio Society Awards	February 17, 2013	Outstanding Achievement in Sound Mixing for a Motion Picture – Animated	Tighe Sheldon, Andy Nelson, Jim Bolt, Peter Cobbin, and Kyle Rochlin	Nominated	
Critics Choice Movie Awards	January 10, 2013	Best Animated Feature	Rise of the Guardians	Nominated	
Golden Globe Awards	January 13, 2013	Best Animated Feature Film	Rise of the Guardians	Nominated	
Golden Reel Awards	February 17, 2013	Outstanding Achievement in Sound Editing – Feature Animation	Rise of the Guardians	Nominated	
Hollywood Film Awards	October 22, 2012	Best Animated Feature	Peter Ramsey	Won	
Houston Film Critics Society Awards	January 5, 2013	Best Animated Film	Rise of the Guardians	Nominated	
International Film Music Critics Association Awards	January 11, 2013	Film Composer of the Year	Alexandre Desplat	Nominated	
International Film Music Critics Association Awards	January 11, 2013	Best Original Score for an Animated Film	Alexandre Desplat	Won	
Mill Valley Film Festival	October 4–14, 2012	Audience Favorite Children's Film	Peter Ramsey	Won	
Producers Guild of America Awards	January 26, 2013	Best Animated Motion Picture	Nancy Bernstein and Christina Steinberg	Nominated	
San Diego Film Critics Society Awards	December 11, 2012	Best Animated Film	Rise of the Guardians	Nominated	
Satellite Awards	December 16, 2012	Best Animated or Mixed Media Feature	Rise of the Guardians	Won	
Satellite Awards	February 23, 2014	Outstanding Youth Blu-Ray/DVD	Rise of the Guardians	Won	
St. Louis Film Critics Association Awards	December 11, 2012	Best Animated Film	Rise of the Guardians	Nominated	
Visual Effects Society Awards	February 5, 2013	Outstanding Visual Effects in an Animated Feature	Nancy Bernstein, David Prescott, Peter Ramsey, and Christina Steinberg	Nominated	
Visual Effects Society Awards	February 5, 2013	Outstanding Created Environment in an Animated Feature	Eric Bouffard, Sonja Burchard, Andy Harbeck, and Peter Maynez for "The North Pole"	Nominated	
Visual Effects Society Awards	February 5, 2013	Outstanding Effects Simulations in an Animated Feature	Andy Hayes, Carl Hooper, Andrew Wheeler, and Stephen Wood for "Last Stand"	Nominated	
Washington D.C. Area Film Critics Association Awards	December 10, 2012	Best Animated Feature	Rise of the Guardians	Nominated	
World Soundtrack Awards	October 19, 2013	Soundtrack Composer of the Year	Alexandre Desplat (Note: Also for Argo (2012), Renoir (2012), and Zero Dark Thirty (2012))	Nominated	

== Video games ==
A video game based on the film was released by D3 Publisher on November 20, 2012, in North America, and released on November 23, 2012, in Europe. It allows gamers to lead the Guardians in their battle against Pitch. The game is a 3D beat-em-up, where the player travels through each of the worlds: Burgess, North Pole, Bunnymund Valley, Tooth Palace and Sandman's Ship, to fight Pitch's army of Nightmares. The player can switch between all five guardians at any time, and freely customize their powers, and they learn new special abilities as they level up. All the game versions support up to 4-player gameplay. It is available on the Wii, Wii U, Xbox 360, PlayStation 3, Nintendo DS, and Nintendo 3DS.

Another video game, also of the same name, was released by DreamWorks Animation for iOS on April 6, 2012, over seven months before the console versions.

== Possible sequel ==
After the release of the film, the creators of Rise of the Guardians expressed hope that the strong average grade of "A" given to the film by audiences surveyed by CinemaScore and an enthusiastic word-of-mouth would gather support for the "chance to make a sequel or two." Author and co-producer of the series, William Joyce, also mentioned in March 2013 that he was still in talks about a sequel with DreamWorks Animation: "There is something that we are proposing that we hope they will want to do."

== See also ==
- List of Christmas films
- List of Easter films
- Santa Claus in film
