= Timeline of the 2007 Lebanon conflict =

This is a detailed timeline of the 2007 Lebanon conflict.

== Timeline ==
=== May 20: Start of the fighting in Tripoli and Nahr al-Bared ===
Fighting began early on Sunday after a police raid on a house in Tripoli which was apparently being used by militants from Fatah al-Islam. The militant group subsequently began shooting at the Lebanese security forces who returned fire, triggering clashes in the vicinity of the Nahr al-Bared Palestinian refugee camp near Tripoli. The men reportedly resisted arrest and the violence spread to neighbouring streets. The police and the army had conducted the raid after allegations that Fatah al-Islam members tried to rob a bank on Sunday and "take control of several security strongholds in the North" according to Ahmad Fatfat, Lebanese Minister of Youth and Sports in Prime Minister Fouad Siniora's cabinet. Militants then attacked a Lebanese military post at the gate of the camp, seizing several vehicles. The Lebanese military sent reinforcements, including tanks, which returned fire at Fatah al-Islam positions. At least 27 Lebanese soldiers were killed in the fighting, along with an undetermined number of civilians and militants.

=== May 21: Nahr al-Bared under siege ===
Fighting renewed after a short-lived truce earlier in the day was declared in order to transport the dead and injured out of the camp in ambulances. According to the Lebanese news channel NewTV, allegations arose that Fatah al-Islam militiamen shot at ambulances entering and exiting the camp. The Lebanese Army began shelling Nahr al-Bared at what it believed were Fatah al-Islam positions; many civilians were killed.

=== May 22: The fighting continues at Nahr al-Bared, ceasefire ===
Despite talks of a cease-fire, Fatah al-Islam militants continued battling the Lebanese army at the outskirts of the refugee camp for a third day. Fighting resumed when Lebanese tanks and artillery began shelling the members of the radical Fatah al-Islam group taking refuge in the camp. By mid-morning the battle intensified with heavy exchanges of small arms and machine-gun fire. Conditions inside the overcrowded Nahr al-Bared camp became increasingly unbearable as the army continued pounding militant positions there. Doctors in the camp have pleaded for a ceasefire because of the dead and wounded lying on the streets. Electricity has been cut and there is a limited supply of water. Brig. Gen. Bilal Aslam said that "the Lebanese Army prevented supplies and aid from entering the camp." He also claimed militant fighters were stationed on the outskirts of the camp, but not in it.

The militant group said it would end confrontations with the Lebanese army starting 14.30 local time. A fragile truce let 10 people flee Nahr al-Bared. In Tripoli, one Fatah al-Islam militant blew himself up, after being surrounded by Lebanese soldiers in the same house that security forces had raided on May 21, 2007.

=== May 23: Thousands flee Nahr al-Bared ===
During a nighttime truce announced Tuesday, about 2,000 inhabitants of the Nahr al-Bared camp had been able to flee. Some refugees left on foot while others were in cars and vans. The Red Crescent helped the refugees relocate to the nearby Beddawi camp, where they spent the night at schools. Other refugees left for the nearby city of Tripoli. Reports suggest that snipers fired at the fleeing crowd of refugees as they left their homes. The truce seemed to have ended when a UN aid convoy was attacked later that night. "The humanitarian situation is very, very bad," said a spokeswoman for the U.N. Relief and Works Agency, "and deteriorating every minute. Inside the camp, there are no hospitals and only one health center," which was unable to stay open during the fighting.

=== May 24: Sporadic fighting resumes at the camp ===
The Lebanese Prime Minister, Fouad Siniora, vowed to "uproot" terrorism from his country in his address to the nation, blaming the Fatah al-Islam militants for using the Palestinian refugees as hostages in their goal of destabilizing Lebanon. The Prime Minister said that the government would not "surrender to terrorism" and would work to eradicate it. Siniora also stressed that the target of military operations are the militants and not the Palestinian refugees in the camp. Following the speech, renewed fighting erupted between the militants and the Lebanese army at the entrance of the Nahr al-Bared camp. The Lebanese military shot and sank two inflatable boats carrying militants from the camp. But, the BBC reported that Thursday's gunfire exchanges were sporadic and that there was no sign of the heavy shelling seen before. But government threats of harsh action against the militants has raised fears that the Lebanese army could begin an all-out assault on the camp at any time, raising further concerns for the humanitarian situation of those civilians still inside.

=== May 25–26: Military aid shipments to Lebanon ===
Five military transport planes carrying military aid for the Lebanese army from the United States and its Arab allies arrived at Beirut airport. One plane was from the U.S. Air Force, two from the United Arab Emirates Air Force and two from the Royal Jordanian Air Force. The planes, which came mainly from US bases in the region, arrived following an appeal for such aid by the Lebanese government. On Saturday May 26, two additional U.S. transport planes also carrying military aid landed in Beirut. The military supplies are believed to include ammunition for automatic rifles and heavy weapons, spare parts for military helicopters and night-vision equipment. American Secretary of State Condoleezza Rice reaffirmed Washington's support for the Siniora government and added that Fatah al-Islam was trying to destabilise the democratically elected Lebanese government. But, Hezbollah leader Sheikh Hassan Nasrallah said he doubted the sudden rise in US sincerity in Lebanese internal affairs. Sporadic exchanges of gunfire were also reported between Lebanese troops and Fatah al-Islam fighters as the army continued to build up its presence around the Nahr al-Bared refugee camp. According to the BBC, the militants still holed up inside the camp were determined not to surrender. Aid workers struggled to deliver food and medicine to the thousands of Palestinian refugees who had not left the area.

May 26 was a largely peaceful day.

=== May 27–28: Fighting erupts, negotiations continue ===
Lebanese army posts were shelled and gunfire was heard late on May 27, despite a cease-fire deal at Nahr al-Bared. The head of Fatah al-Islam, the militant Palestinian group, said his men would not surrender. The latest spat of violence came as negotiations were reportedly taking place with the Islamists. The conflict had entered its first week and left dozens dead, including many civilians. A UN staffer declared that about 25,000 had fled the camp by now but thousands still remain. The Lebanese army was helped by new reinforcements being sent up. Lebanese government officials have told AFP that they had given Palestinian factions until the middle of the week to negotiate a peaceful solution to end the fighting. According to the BBC, Fatah al-Islam leaders now seem to have endorsed the same rhetoric as al-Qaeda. The group previously stated that it was defending Muslims and Palestinians in Lebanon but rival factions have distanced themselves from the group.

=== May 29–31: Fighting and charges ===
Sporadic fighting erupted on May 29 between the Lebanese army and militants, with no sign of progress in efforts to mediate an end to the 10-day standoff. One Lebanese soldier was killed in the clashes. On May 30, Lebanon charged 20 members of Fatah al-Islam with terrorism. Judiciary sources said Wednesday's charges against the 19 Lebanese and one Syrian, all in custody, carried the death penalty. May 31 was largely peaceful.

=== June 1: Heavy fighting ===
Heavy fighting has resumed on the morning of June 1 between the Lebanese army and Islamic militants entrenched in Nahr el-Bared. Artillery shelling and machine-gun fire have been heard as tanks massed outside the Nahr al-Bared camp in what may be the start of a final ground offensive. The fighting was reported to be concentrated by the southern and northern entrances of the camp. At least 19 people were killed, including three army soldiers.

=== June 2: The offensive continues ===
On Saturday morning the Lebanese Army resumed the attack on the terrorists in the camp, using artillery shelling and an attack helicopter for the first time since the beginning of the fights. Fatah al-Islam confirms that one of its senior leaders, Abu Riyadh, had been killed by a Lebanese army sniper.

=== June 3–4: Ain al-Hilweh violence ===
Fighting broke out between soldiers and Islamist militants at a second Palestinian refugee camp in Lebanon. The violence in the Ain al-Hilweh camp, near the southern city of Sidon, was said to involve Jund al-Sham militants. Two people - a soldier and a civilian - were injured when suspected militants fired a grenade at an army checkpoint. Army troops responded to the rocket propelled grenade attack with gunfire. In subsequent fighting, two soldiers and two militants were killed

=== June 5: Lebanese troops continue to pound refugee camp ===
While the Lebanese army intensified its offensive on the refugee camp in Nahr al-Bared, seven Fatah al-Islam members surrendered to mainstream Fatah Palestinian faction. Fatah is the first Palestinian faction present in the numerous refugee camps in Lebanon to take action against the allegedly al-Qaeda linked group since the fighting began. Khaled Aref, a representative of the mainstream Fatah group in the Ein al-Hilweh camp, said Palestinian factions there had decided to "isolate Jund al-Sham and not give way to any attempt to import any of what's happening in Nahr al-Bared."

=== June 6–7: Calm days ===
Only sporadic gunfire and some mortar rounds and artillery shells were heard these days. A Lebanese soldier was killed by Islamist sniper fire in the Nahr el-Bared refugee camp.

=== June 8: Heavy fighting erupts once again ===
After mediators failed to convince the Islamists to surrender, the Lebanese army attacked Nahr el-Bared once again. Witnesses inside the camp said over the weeks, the army has conquered more and more positions from Fatah al-Islam inside the camp. Fatah al-Islam has threatened to spread fighting to other parts of the country.

=== June 9–10: Heavy casualties for the army ===
As Lebanese troops attacks the Islamists inside, they meet stiff resistance from Islamist militiamen from their positions. 9 soldiers died on Saturday alone. Casualties on the Fatah al Islam side remain unknown. The army said they were on the winning hand, but the Islamists said they are holding their ground. A spokesman for FaI said they had seized Lebanese Army weapons in an attack A huge rally with tens of thousands of demonstrators was walked in Tripoli to thank and support the Lebanese Army.

=== June 13–14: Relative calm ===
Two days of relative calm followed heavy fighting.

=== June 25: Continued advancements ===
Heavy fighting continued between the Lebanese army and Fatah al-Islam. Reports from army sources stated that 3 army soldiers and 15 militants were killed. About 40 bodies of killed militants were cleared from the camp and 40 Fatah al-Islam militants were arrested. In a report by Lebanon's Defense Minister Elias Murr to al Arabiyeh TV recounted that the attack on UNIFIL was not a suicide bomb but it was a remotely activated car bomb.

=== September 2: camp taken ===
Lebanese troops took control of the Palestinian refugee camp, killing at least 31 fighters who tried to flee

=== September 7: victory declared ===
The Lebanese Army officially declares victory in Naher al-Bared.
