= 2007 Lebanon conflict =

Conflict in Lebanon in 2007

- Part of the war on terror
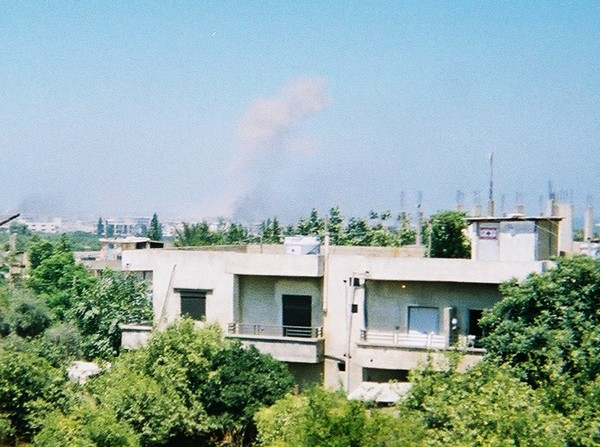
- The shelling of the Nahr al-Bared refugee camp
Date	20 May – 7 September 2007 (3 months, 2 weeks and 4 days)
Location	Fighting: Nahr al-Bared, Tripoli, Ain al-Hilweh; Bombings: Beirut, Aley, Zouk Mosbeh; Attack on UNIFIL: Khiam
Result	Lebanese victory

Belligerents
(Lebanon) Lebanese Government; (Lebanon) Lebanese Armed Forces; (Lebanon) Internal Security Forces; Supported by: United States	Fatah al-Islam; Jund al-Sham

Commanders and leaders
(Lebanon) Michel Suleiman (Lebanon) Francois al-Hajj (Lebanon) Chamel Roukoz (Lebanon) Antoine Pano (Lebanon) Saleh Kais (Lebanon) Georges Nader (Lebanon) Georges Chreim (Lebanon) Hanna Makdessi	Shaker al-Abssi †; Abu Youssef Sharqieh (POW); Abu Hureira †

Strength
4,000 troops	450 Fatah militants, 50 Jund militants

Casualties and losses
Northern casualties: 168–179 killed, 400–500 wounded Southern casualties: 2 killed, 6 wounded	Fatah al-Islam casualties: 226 killed, 215 captured Jund al-Sham casualties: 5 killed Bomber cells: 7 killed, 18 captured
- Civilian casualties: 55 killed in the fighting, 12 killed in the bombings International Red Cross: 2 killed UNIFIL: 6 soldiers killed, 2 wounded

The 2007 Lebanon conflict began when fighting broke out between Fatah al-Islam, an Islamist militant organization, and the Lebanese Armed Forces (LAF) on May 20, 2007 in Nahr al-Bared, an UNRWA Palestinian refugee camp near Tripoli.

It was the most severe internal fighting since Lebanon's 1975–90 civil war. The conflict revolved mostly around the siege of Nahr el-Bared, in addition to clashes that occurred in the Ain al-Hilweh refugee camp in southern Lebanon and other bombings that took place in and around the Lebanese capital, Beirut. Fighting ended in September 2007.

== Background ==
=== Nahr al-Bared refugee camp ===
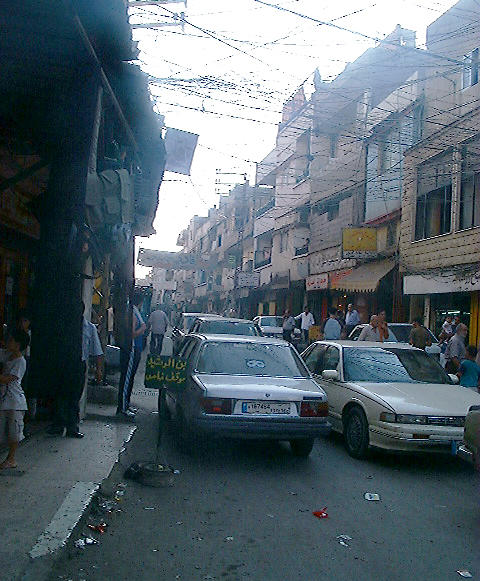
Narrow street in Nahr al-Bared, 2005

Lebanon hosts more than 400,000 Palestinian refugees, some 215,000 of whom live in camps, including the descendants of those who fled from Palestine during the 1948 Arab-Israeli War. In 1962, Palestinians were categorized as foreigners in Lebanon, regardless of how long they had lived there. Non-Lebanese, which included the refugees, were restricted from working in over 70 skilled professions until 2005, when new legislation officially opened 50 such jobs to them. The Lebanese Civil War left the government and general populace deeply suspicious of Palestinian refugees because of their involvement in the war. The main problem was the Cairo Agreement, signed by the Lebanese government and the Palestinian Movement, which was rejected by the Christian Movements who considered the agreement against the sovereignty of Lebanon because it rendered the Palestinian guerillas uncontrolled freedom. Yet, under the 1969 Arab accord, which was annulled by the Lebanese Parliament in the mid-1980s, the government has been reluctant to enter the camps. The current residents of the camps are denied access to their homeland or neighboring Arab nations.

The Nahr al-Bared Palestinian refugee camp is situated 16 km north of Tripoli near the coastal road and had been under scrutiny since February, when two buses were bombed in Ain Alak, a predominantly Christian village near Bikfaya. Fatah al-Islam militants based in the camp were blamed. About 30,000 displaced Palestinians live in the camp.

== Timeline ==
=== May 20: Start of the fighting in Tripoli and Nahr al-Bared ===
Fighting began early in the morning after a police raid on a house in Tripoli which was apparently being used by militants from Fatah al-Islam. The militant group subsequently began shooting at the Lebanese security forces, who returned fire, triggering clashes in the vicinity of the Nahr al-Bared Palestinian refugee camp near Tripoli. The men reportedly resisted arrest and the violence spread to neighbouring streets. Militants then attacked a Lebanese military post at the gate of the camp, slaughtering 27 soldiers during their sleep, seizing several vehicles and also killing an undetermined number of civilians that came to the rescue of the Lebanese army.

=== May 21–31: Nahr al-Bared under siege ===
Despite talks of a cease-fire, Fatah al-Islam militants continued battling the Lebanese army at the outskirts of the refugee camp, while Lebanese tanks and artillery continued shelling militant positions in the camp. By now the camp was totally surrounded by the Lebanese Army and more troops were coming in with tanks and APC's. Beirut's airport was the scene of several military aid shipments, mainly from the United States.

=== June 1–2: First Lebanese Army attack ===
Tanks massed outside the Nahr al-Bared camp and started a ground offensive. The fighting was concentrated in the southern and northern entrances of the camp. At least 19 people were killed, including three army soldiers. Among the dead was also a senior leader of Fatah al-Islam, Abu Riyadh, who was killed by a Lebanese army sniper. After 48 hours of fighting the battle was over and the Army was repelled.

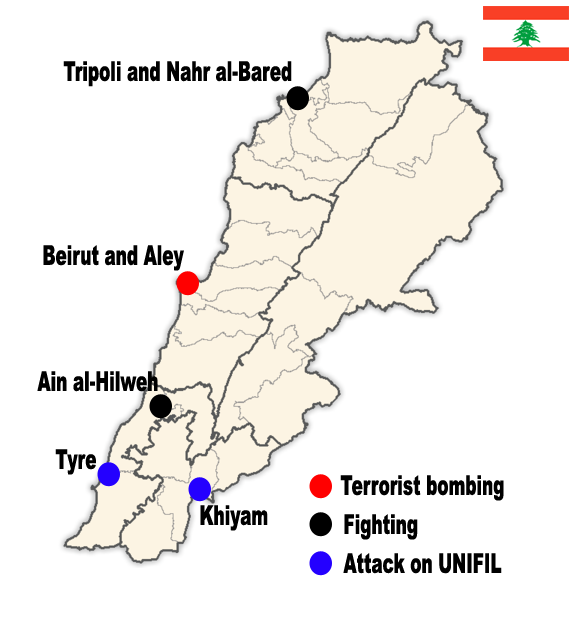
Location of events

=== June 9–12: Second Lebanese Army attack ===
After mediators failed to convince the Islamists to surrender, the Lebanese Army attacked Nahr el-Bared once again. The troops advanced 50 meters before they had to stop after taking heavy casualties due to booby-trapped buildings and other Fatah al-Islam positions that the militants left behind. In all 29 people were killed within 24 hours: 11 soldiers, 16 militants and 2 civilians. Another 100 soldiers were wounded. Some of the fighting was close-quarters and almost hand to hand.

On June 11, two Lebanese Red Cross workers were killed outside Nahr al-Bared as they were evacuating civilians. On June 12, the Lebanese army occupied two key positions from Fatah al-Islam within the camp, one of them on the coastal side of the camp.

=== June 16–19: Third Lebanese Army attack ===
The Lebanese Army continued the offensive and heavy bombardment hit the camp. On June 16, two Lebanese Gazelle helicopters fired four air-to-ground missiles at suspected militant positions inside the camp. In 48 hours the Army managed to take another six Fatah al-Islam positions. At this time the only aim of the military was to destroy all of the militant's positions on the outskirts of the camp, but the Army had no intention of going into the camp itself. On June 19, the Army finally managed to take all of the main positions of the Islamists. All of the buildings in the new (northern) part of the camp where the Fatah al-Islam fighters were dug in had been taken. Another seven soldiers were killed during this new round of fighting.

=== June 21: Outer parts of the camp fall ===
On June 21, the Lebanese defence minister reported that all of the Fatah al-Islam positions on the outlying areas of the camp, from which the militants were attacking soldiers, had been taken or destroyed. The only positions left were those in the center of the camp from where the militants posed no threat and thus the Army had no intention of attacking the center of the camp. With this it was declared that the Lebanese military operation to destroy Fatah al-Islam was over. However, heavy fighting still continued in the days ahead.

=== June 24–25: Renewed fighting in Tripoli & Nahr el-Bared ===
On June 24, for the first time since May 20, fighting erupted in Tripoli at an apartment building after a military raid on an Islamist militant cell that left 12 people dead. Among those killed were 7 non-Fatah militants, 1 soldier, 1 policeman and 3 civilians. Another 14 soldiers were wounded.

On June 28, the military found and engaged a group of Fatah al-Islam militants, in a cave in the mountains south of Tripoli, in fighting that killed 5 Islamists.

=== June 30: Jund al-Sham disbanded ===
On June 30, the Usbat Al-Ansar source said that 23 members of Jund Al Sham in the Ain Al Helweh camp on the outskirts of the port city of Sidon have joined up with Usbat at a meeting, while the rest had laid down their weapons. Usbat Al Ansar detained three other members of the group on suspicion of hurling a grenade at an army checkpoint, in an incident that caused no casualties.

=== July 12–24: Fourth Lebanese Army attack ===
On July 12, after a lull in the fighting, the Lebanese army launched a new assault, towards the center of the camp where the last battle positions of the Islamists were. They resumed with the bombardment of the camp and troops engaged the militants in heavy street fighting. 33 soldiers were killed and 93 wounded during the fighting among the ruins of the camp where the Islamist fighters were well dug in, and large parts of the camp were also booby-trapped.

On July 14, militants escalated the fighting by firing Katyusha rockets at towns surrounding the camp. One civilian was killed, and several were wounded.

On July 16, the Army managed to take a hill in the southern part of the camp which represented a highly strategic position.

By July 20, only 300 square yards had been left in the hands of the Islamists in the southern part of the camp. The army's advance was slowed down until they were able to defuse dozens of booby-traps left in the ruins of the camp by the Islamists.

=== July 25 – August 13: Fifth Lebanese Army attack ===
Soldiers moved into the fighting area under cover from artillery fire, tank fire and gunfire. A witness said this was the heaviest shelling of insurgent positions he had ever seen. A Lebanese source said the army was ready to make the final push and capture the last 250 yards (230 m) still in hands of the insurgents. About 130 people were believed to be holed up in the area, about 70 fighters and 60 civilians. The militants answered with the firing of a handful of Katyusha rockets at Lebanese villages near the camp.

On July 28, a tiny enclave in the already recaptured part of the camp was captured and the militants inside, 8 people, were killed. The surprise attack was carried out by elite units. Cannons and armored vehicles were driven into the camp to demolish fortified houses, bunkers and tunnels. General Michel Sulaiman added, that victory was imminent and only days away.

On August 2, Abu Hureira, the deputy commander of Fatah al-Islam, was killed in Abu Samra during a shootout with Lebanese police when he tried to flee them whilst shooting at a checkpoint set up by the police.

On August 8, it was reported the advance of the Lebanese troops was troubled by the smell of rotting corpses of slain militants who had not been buried, even weeks after their death. It was said the smell was so bad the air was unbreathable.

=== August 17–23: Sixth Lebanese Army attack ===
In the days leading up to the latest assault on the militants, Gazelle attack helicopters bombed the Islamists' positions and bunkers. On August 17, the Army advances continued. A truce was made on August 24 to allow the 63 family members, 25 women and 38 children, of the Islamist fighters to leave the camp. This left a chance for a final assault on the militants by the army, and indications were that only 70 militants were left active in the camp, in reality almost 100 were still holed up. Air raids continued the next day.

=== August 30 – September 3: Final Lebanese Army attack ===
Heavy fighting continued on August 30 after the evacuation of the civilians and almost a week of heavy bombing raids from attack helicopters. More street battles occurred as the troops advanced further into the winding streets of the camp. By this point most of the subterranean shelters had been taken by the army but the militants still held their positions in bunkers and among the ruins of the camp. All the time during the latest attack the militants were issuing calls for a cease-fire so that some 35 wounded militants could be evacuated. The army did not accept the cease-fire. On September 1, the army managed to take the homes of Shaker al-Abssi and his deputy Abu Hureira, who was killed in July during the fighting. However, there was still no sign of Abssi himself.

==== September 2: Militant breakout and the fall of the camp ====
On September 2, militants launched a coordinated plan to escape from Nahr al-Bared. The fighting began when militants on the eastern and southern edge of the camp attacked army checkpoints. Militants also had help from outside the camp. The attack on the eastern edge of the camp started after a Mercedes car pulled up at an army checkpoint from outside around 04:00 AM and began firing at soldiers as fighters launched an attack from inside the camp. At the same time militants attacked another checkpoint on the southern edge of the camp. Some of them were wearing army uniforms. Three militant groups attempted the breakout. One group tried to escape by sea and its members were killed or captured by the army. A second group tried to flee from the north of Nahr al-Bared and met the same fate. The leader of Fatah al-Islam, Shaker al-Abssi, was believed to be in the third group that followed the path of a river running between the southeastern part of the camp and the village of Ayun al-Samak in a remote mountainous region. Several members of that group were killed but most of them escaped. The whole militant leadership was thought to have escaped. It was later confirmed that al-Abssi actually fled the camp a day before the breakout. His fate remains unknown. The army said 35 militants managed to break the cordon and flee, but most of them were killed or captured in the coming days. The fighting lasted from dawn through early afternoon with troops engaging Fatah al-Islam fighters in buildings, fields and roads around the Nahr al-Bared camp. Up to 38 militants, five soldiers and one civilian were killed and 24 militants were captured. The camp finally fell by 11:00 AM.

Celebratory gunfire erupted in nearby villages as soon as the news of the army victory spread. Dozens of residents took to the streets of Mohammara, waving Lebanese flags and honking their horns as troop convoys poured into the area with soldiers flashing victory signs.

On September 3, Lebanese forces killed four militants and captured two in the area near the camp. The militants attacked soldiers looking for the fleeing fighters, wounding two of them and forcing the Lebanese soldiers to flee, but were finally killed by artillery fire which lasted for more than an hour. Six bodies of slain militants were found inside the camp.

Sporadic fighting continued near the camp until September 7. Lebanon then declared victory.

== Bombings in and around Beirut ==
May 21: Fatah al-Islam claimed responsibility for two bombings that took place in Beirut. Then a spokesman for the group denied any responsibility for them.

A third bombing, in a Christian neighborhood northeast of Beirut called Mansouriyeh, was foiled when authorities caught a Palestinian and an Egyptian carrying a bag full of explosives.

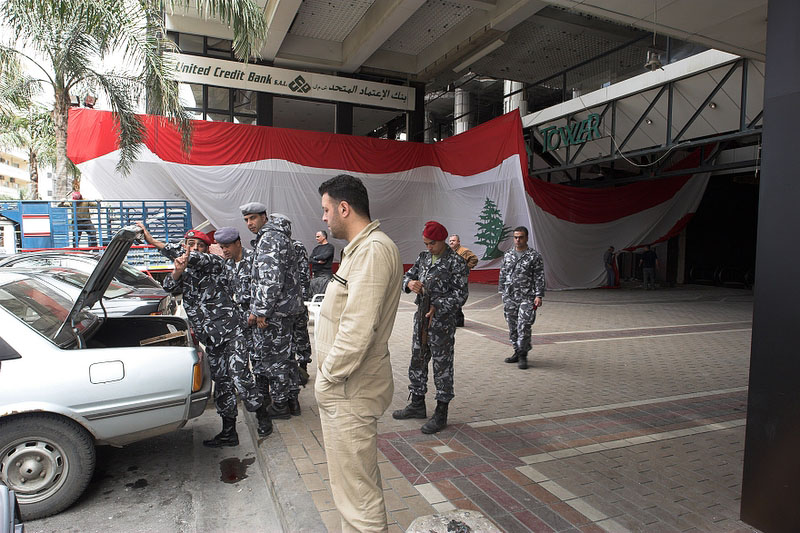
Aftermath at an attack site

May 23: A bomb went off near the main government building in Aley, a majority Druze town about 17 km northeast of Beirut. Reports said about five people were injured and a few buildings damaged by the blast. The security forces said the bomb was in a bag that had been left in front of a building close to a shopping district.

May 27: In Beirut, two policemen and two civilians were injured when a grenade was thrown in a mainly Muslim section of the city.

June 13: A car bomb hit Beirut's seafront Corniche al-Manara, killing Walid Eido, a member of parliament with the Current for the Future bloc known for his opposition to the Syrian influence on Lebanon. His eldest son, Khaled, and two bodyguards were also killed, along with up to six other civilians.

The blast may have been tied to the fighting in the north, or it may have been tied to the series of bombings and assassinations of anti-Syrian figures going back to Rafiq Hariri's killing.

== Attacks on United Nations peacekeepers ==
On June 24, a UNIFIL armored personnel carrier was hit by a car bomb on the border with Israel, killing six Spanish soldiers and wounding another two Spanish soldiers. Both the Lebanese government and Hezbollah condemned the attack. Intelligence gathered from captured militants indicated that the militants were planning to attack United Nations soldiers on the Israeli-Lebanese border. Fatah al-Islam itself also said that if the fighting continued it would conduct attacks on targets outside of northern Lebanon. Al-Qaeda additionally stated that it would target the U.N. troops on the border.

== Casualties ==
At least 446–457 people, including 168–179 soldiers and 226 militants, had been killed in the fighting during the 105-day siege of the camp. Between 400 and 500 soldiers had been wounded and more than 215 militants had been captured.

Twelve Lebanese civilians were killed in terrorist bombings in and around Beirut, two soldiers and five militants were killed in the Ain al-Hilweh camp, seven non-Fatah Islamic militants were killed during a raid in Tripoli, and six U.N. soldiers were killed, while two were wounded in the bombing attack on the Israeli-Lebanon border.

55 civilians were killed in the fighting at the camp and in Tripoli, 47 of them Palestinians.

Most of the some 31,000 Palestinians that lived at the camp fled the fighting to other camps in the country.

== Reactions ==
- Fouad Siniora, Lebanon's prime minister, accused Fatah al-Islam of trying to destabilize the country. Lebanese Interior Minister Hasan al-Sabaa described Fatah al-Islam as "part of the Syrian intelligence-security apparatus." Lebanon's national police commander, Maj. Gen. Ashraf Rifi, contradicted the Lebanese army and dismissed any purported al-Qaeda connection, saying Fatah al-Islam was controlled by Damascus. Lebanese Christian leader Samir Geagea said that Fatah al-Islam is an offshoot of Syrian intelligence and its terrorist activities must end. Nayla Mouawad, Lebanese social affairs minister, said the militants have "Syrian allegiance and only take orders from Syria." Lebanese Minister of Economy and Trade, Sami Haddad, told the BBC his government suspected Syria of masterminding the violence. Haddad also asked for money and resources to help Lebanese forces battling the militants. "I take this opportunity to ask our friends all over the world—Arab governments and friendly Western governments—to help us both logistically and with military equipment," he declared. The Lebanese Cabinet declared its "full support" for military efforts to end the fighting, said Mohamed Chatah, a senior adviser to Prime Minister Fouad Siniora. "Lebanese security forces are targeting militants and are not randomly shooting into the refugee camp," Chatah said. The living conditions at the camp are partly to blame for the rise of Fatah al-Islam, according to Khalil Makkawi, a former Lebanese ambassador to the United Nations. Lebanese President Emile Lahoud called on all Lebanese to unite around the army. Druze leader Walid Jumblatt, a supporter of Lebanon's governing coalition, said there were "no proposals" for a military solution. "But we want the murderers handed over to Lebanese justice," he said.
- A Fatah al-Islam spokesman, Abu Salim, told Al-Jazeera television that the group was only defending itself. "We were forced and compelled to be in this confrontation with the Lebanese army," Abu Salim said in an interview on Arabic language network Al-Jazeera. Fatah al-Islam's leader, Shaker al-Abssi, told Al-Arabiya TV in June that his group had no connection to al-Qaeda or Syria. He said, his group seeks to reform Palestinian refugee camps in accordance with Islamic law, or Sharia. In a video message released by the Fatah al-Islam leader he ruled out surrender. "O advocates of the US plan, we tell you that Sunnis will be a spearhead in fighting the Jews, Americans and their allies," he said.
- Minutes after the violence erupted, Syria temporarily closed two border crossings with northern Lebanon because of security concerns. Syrian leaders deny fomenting violence in Lebanon. Syria's ambassador to the United Nations, Bashar Jaafari, has denied his country had any links to the group, and said some of them had been in jail in Syria for their support of al-Qaeda.
- The Palestine Liberation Organization and the Palestinian factions' union delegation to the Grand Serail stressed Palestinians should shoulder responsibility of the improvised action by Fatah al-Islam. The delegation comprised representatives from Hamas, The Democratic Front, Sa'iqa, Nidal Front, Islamic Jihad, Fatah al-Intifada, Palestinian Liberation Front and Abbas Zaki, the representative of the executive committee of the PLO.
- Hezbollah views extremist Sunni groups such as al-Qaeda and Fatah al-Islam as enemies but in an address to mark the seventh anniversary of Israel's withdrawal from Lebanon, Sayyed Hassan Nasrallah, the leader of the Shia group Hezbollah, urged the Lebanese government not to storm the Nahr al-Bared refugee camp and attack Fatah al-Islam. He demanded the conflict solved politically. "The Nahr al-Bared camp and Palestinian civilians are a red line," Nasrallah said. "We will not accept or provide cover or be partners in this." Nasrallah also condemned attacks against the army and said: "The Lebanese army is the guardian of security, stability and national unity in this country. We should all regard this army as the only institution left capable of preserving security and stability in this country." Nasrallah was skeptical of a U.S. military aid shipment to Lebanon and according to the Hezbollah leader, the Lebanese should not allow themselves to become entangled with al-Qaeda on behalf of the United States. "I wonder why all this care now for the Lebanese army," he said, referring to the 2006 conflict between Israel and Hezbollah. "Are you willing to fight the wars of others inside Lebanon?" he asked his audience.
- United States. President George W. Bush said the Islamists needed to be stopped. "Extremists that are trying to topple that young democracy need to be reined in," he said. The U.S. State Department dismissed any links between this week's violence and efforts to establish the international tribunal to try suspects for the 2005 assassination of former Lebanese Prime Minister Rafiq Hariri.
- Al-Qaeda released a statement saying: "Sons of Islam, o sons of the nation of Allah and Jihad, our brothers in the Nahr el-Bared camp in Lebanon are being subjected to the flagrant aggression of the army working for treason and apostasy, the Lebanese Army." They called on "every Muslim" to support Fatah al-Islam because it is seeking "a confrontation" with Israel.
  - An Al-Qaeda linked group based in Lebanon, accused the Lebanese government of embarking on a "crusade" after depriving its Palestinian inhabitants of basic rights.
  - Tawheed and Jihad in Syria, said Christians in Lebanon were part of a 'united crusader-Jewish front' directed against Muslims, and accused the "Lebanese army, government, intelligence branches and police" of being "the guard dogs of France and America." Calling upon its supporters to "support the jihad," the group also said: "We warn that if the Lebanese government does not lift its blockade, its sons living on Syrian territory will be considered moving targets," adding that it would carry out operations against Lebanese government officials citizens in Syria.

== See also ==
- List of extrajudicial killings and political violence in Lebanon
- Siege of Beirut
- War of the camps
- February 13, 2007 Bikfaya bombings
- 2006–2007 Lebanese political protests
- 2006 Lebanon War
- List of wars involving Lebanon
- List of wars 2003-current
- List of modern conflicts in the Middle East
