= Diyala campaign =

2006–07 operations in Iraq

- Part of the Iraq War, Iraqi insurgency, and the Iraqi civil war
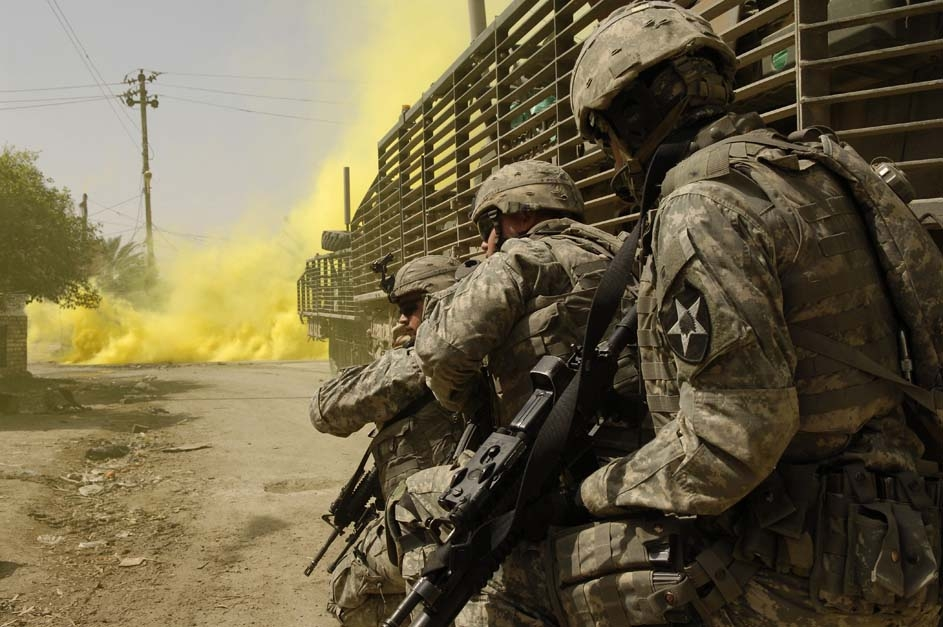
- Soldiers take cover behind a Stryker vehicle during a firefight
| Date | December 25, 2006 – October 1, 2007 (9 months and 6 days) |
| Location | Diyala Governorate, Iraq |
| Result | Allied victory |

Belligerents
| United States; Iraq (Kurdistan Region) Peshmerga | Islamic State of Iraq; Other Iraqi Insurgents |

Commanders and leaders
| (United States) Maj. Gen. Benjamin R. Mixon (Iraq) Maj. Gen. Ahmed al-Kozaee (Iraq) Brig. Gen. Abdul Kareem al-Obaidi † | Abu Omar al-Baghdadi; Abu Hamza al-Muhajir |

Strength
| (United States) 4,200 (Iraq) 20,000 (Kurdistan Region) 2,000 Peshmerga | 2,000 |

Casualties and losses
| (United States) 106 killed (Iraq) 300 security forces killed (Iraq) 22 militia killed | Unknown killed 500 captured |

The Diyala campaign was a series of operations conducted by coalition forces against Iraqi insurgents and a number of bombing and guerrilla attacks against the security forces in the Diyala Governorate of Iraq, with the purpose of control of the province and reducing insurgent activity.

== Background ==
In mid-October 2006, al-Qaeda announced the creation of the Islamic State of Iraq (ISI), replacing the Mujahideen Shura Council (MSC) and its al-Qaeda in Iraq (AQI).

In 2006, Diyala province had special significance for the insurgents. When Abu Musab al-Zarqawi was head of al-Qaeda in Iraq, he designated Diyala as the capital of the Islamic caliphate he planned to establish in the country. He located his headquarters in a village north-west of Baqubah. On 28 April 2006, on Saddam Hussein's birthday, insurgents of the Mujahideen Shura Council including al-Qaeda in Iraq launched a coordinated offensive throughout the province, attacking Muqdadiyah, Balad Ruz, Kanaan, Khalis, Khan Bani Sa'ad and the capital Baqubah. The insurgents used the rural areas east and southeast of the capital, from Balad Ruz to Turki as supply bases for their bombing campaigns in Baghdad and Diyala. They were also based in the Diyala river valley, northeast of Baqubah, where they fought for control of Muqdadiyah, an important line of communication to Lake Hamrin, Kirkuk and Iran. The insurgents also had control of the tribal areas of Khan Bani Sa'ad south of Baqubah to Salman Pak, south-east of Baghdad.

== Prelude ==
Shortly after the insurgent victory in Baghdad after Operation Together Forward insurgents began, little by little, moving their resources from Baghdad, now more than 80 percent under insurgent control, and Al Anbar province, which was also almost completely under insurgent control, to the province of Diyala northeast of Baghdad. The first signs of increased insurgent activity in Diyala came after U.S. forces found an insurgent bunker complex near the village of Turki and fought a bloody battle. Also a few weeks later fighting between police and insurgents after an attack on Baquba's police headquarters shut down the city, closing the university, schools and most stores, and clearing the streets of everyone, except a few who attempted to stock up on food. At least 55 militants were killed in clashes in the preceding days, according to anonymous police sources. During the fighting a mass grave with 28 bodies was discovered. After that U.S. and Iraqi forces begin raids in the city. The morgue in the city reports by the beginning of December 2006 that it had received 102 bodies in the previous two weeks. After the announcement of a new attempt by the U.S. and Iraqi security forces to take back the streets of Baghdad the insurgents started to speed up their move and it is believed that the reason behind the little resistance found by the security forces in Baghdad during Operation Law and Order is that most of the insurgents had moved to Diyala.

== Campaign ==
=== Baquba falls ===
On Christmas Day, it was reported that the capital of the province, Baquba, had fallen under insurgent control. An Iraqi news cameraman went to the city and reported seeing hundreds of gunmen with AK-47s in cars and pickups parading through the city. There was no sign of the security forces except for the bodies of a few executed by the insurgents. After that, there were increased insurgent attacks on the U.S. and Iraqi forces around Baquba and in the rest of the province.

In mid-January, U.S. and Iraqi forces conducted a series of raids that resulted in 93 insurgents killed and 57 captured. Despite that, however, the insurgents had some successes early in the campaign, mainly when they shot down a Black Hawk helicopter on January 20, killing twelve U.S. soldiers. The helicopter was carrying mostly officers from the U.S. National Guard. The dead included a colonel who was the top American military doctor in Iraq.

In January 2007, it was reported that Sunni militants were able to kidnap the mayor of Baquba and blow up his office, despite promises from American and Iraqi military officials that the situation in the city was "reassuring and under control". The city at its peak had over 300,000 residents, but a February 2007 report labeled the city a "ghost town" as most residents had fled.

=== Iraqi security forces under attack ===
In two separate incidents in the beginning of March, insurgents captured 32 members of the Iraqi security forces. The bodies of 14 captured policemen were found shortly after, and the 18 other soldiers and policemen were shown on television with a message that they would be executed. Suicide bombers continued to attack in Diyala, targeting not only military but also civilian targets such as a cafe in Balad Ruz, where 30 people were killed on March 7. The capture of policemen continued, with another 10 policemen captured and 1 killed when insurgents overran a police station in the town of Hibhib. The bodies of five of the policemen were found the next month. Also, 20 Iraqi soldiers and policemen were captured at the beginning of April and were executed several days later.

On March 23, the provincial director of civil defense, Colonel Ahmed Kadhim Jawad, was killed in Khalis.

=== Reinforcements arrive ===
On March 13, 700 men from the Army's 5th Battalion, 20th Infantry Regiment, which includes Stryker armored vehicles, were sent from Baghdad to Diyala as reinforcements to the 3,500 U.S. and 20,000 Iraqi soldiers already in the province. The next day, as the first batch of the reinforcements was moving close to the outskirts of Baquba, the Stryker convoy was hit by machine-gun, RPG and mortar fire. In the ensuing chaos one American soldier was killed, 12 were wounded and two Stryker armored vehicles were destroyed. The same day, in two other separate incidents, two more American soldiers were killed in the province.

=== Attack on Qubah ===
On March 24, the U.S. military started operations to retake the Baqubah River valley. The operation started with an attack on the insurgent-held village of Qubah. Up to 13 Chinooks, Blackhawks and Apache gunships from FOB Warhorse flew in 241 soldiers on the edge of Qubah and heavy street fighting ensued as artillery fire provided cover firing into the surrounding palm groves. At the same time, a convoy of 19 Humvees, two Bradley fighting vehicles and several other vehicles approached from the opposite end. The soldiers encountered several machine gun nests in the town. Some of the fighting was almost hand to hand. The Apaches strafed insurgent positions with cannons and sent Hellfire missiles into buildings soldiers were attacking from the ground. By sunset 16 insurgents were killed and 3 American soldiers were wounded in the initial clashes. As the convoy tried to return to base, they were hit two times by roadside bombs. The Apaches identified the triggermen and killed up to 12 more insurgents. In one of the blasts, 4 American soldiers were killed and 2 were wounded. By the close of the operation on March 24 only the town of Zaganiya was left as the last insurgent stronghold in the Baqubah river valley.

=== Khalis massacre ===
On March 29, three suicide bombers in a coordinated attack on the mostly Shia town of Khalis killed 53 people and wounded 103. This coincided with a double suicide bombing in Baghdad on the Shaab area marketplace that killed 82 people, including many women and children, and wounded 138 others.

=== Diyala cut off, sectarian war intensifies ===
By early April it was reported that insurgents had taken control of the roads between Diyala and Baghdad. Large swaths of territory were in insurgent hands and the U.S. military was stretched thin. Meanwhile, sectarian warfare intensified in the province with a total of 62 bodies being recovered between April 3 and 7. Most of the sectarian killings is done in revenge because after the mass killings of Sunnis by Shiites in Baghdad a large number of Sunnis fled to seek refuge in Baquba. That contributed to the ranks of the Sunni insurgents and also brought a greater sense of hatred toward the Shi'a population of Diyala. Also, even before Baghdad Security Plan, the Shi'a dominated military and police units in Diyala were conducting mass killings of Sunnis. Now, as Diyala has become a new safe haven for Sunni insurgents, like Al Anbar province which has already been overrun by the insurgents, that has changed were the Sunnis are striking back at the Shiites.

Because of the crackdown in Baghdad, many Shiite Mahdi Army units fled from the capital to Diyala where they took up positions in the western parts of the province and carried out attacks against American and Iraqi military targets.

=== 5th Squadron, 73rd Cavalry Regiment under fire ===
One of the American units that took on the most casualties during the campaign was the 5th Squadron, 73rd Cavalry Regiment of the 82nd Airborne Division. The squadron came to Iraq at the beginning of September 2006 with 330 men, but half-way through their deployment almost 100 men from the original roster had been killed or wounded, all in the province of Diyala. By April 23, the squadron lost 20 soldiers to hostile action in the province and more than 80 had been wounded. They took part in the bloody Battle of Turki before the campaign and had been constantly under hit-and-run attacks later on. TF 300 conducted combat operations clearing the Diyala River Valley of ISI forces. With that the squadron became the only squadron of the U.S. Army to lose almost a third of its force in the Iraq war.

=== Operation "Arrowhead Ripper" ===
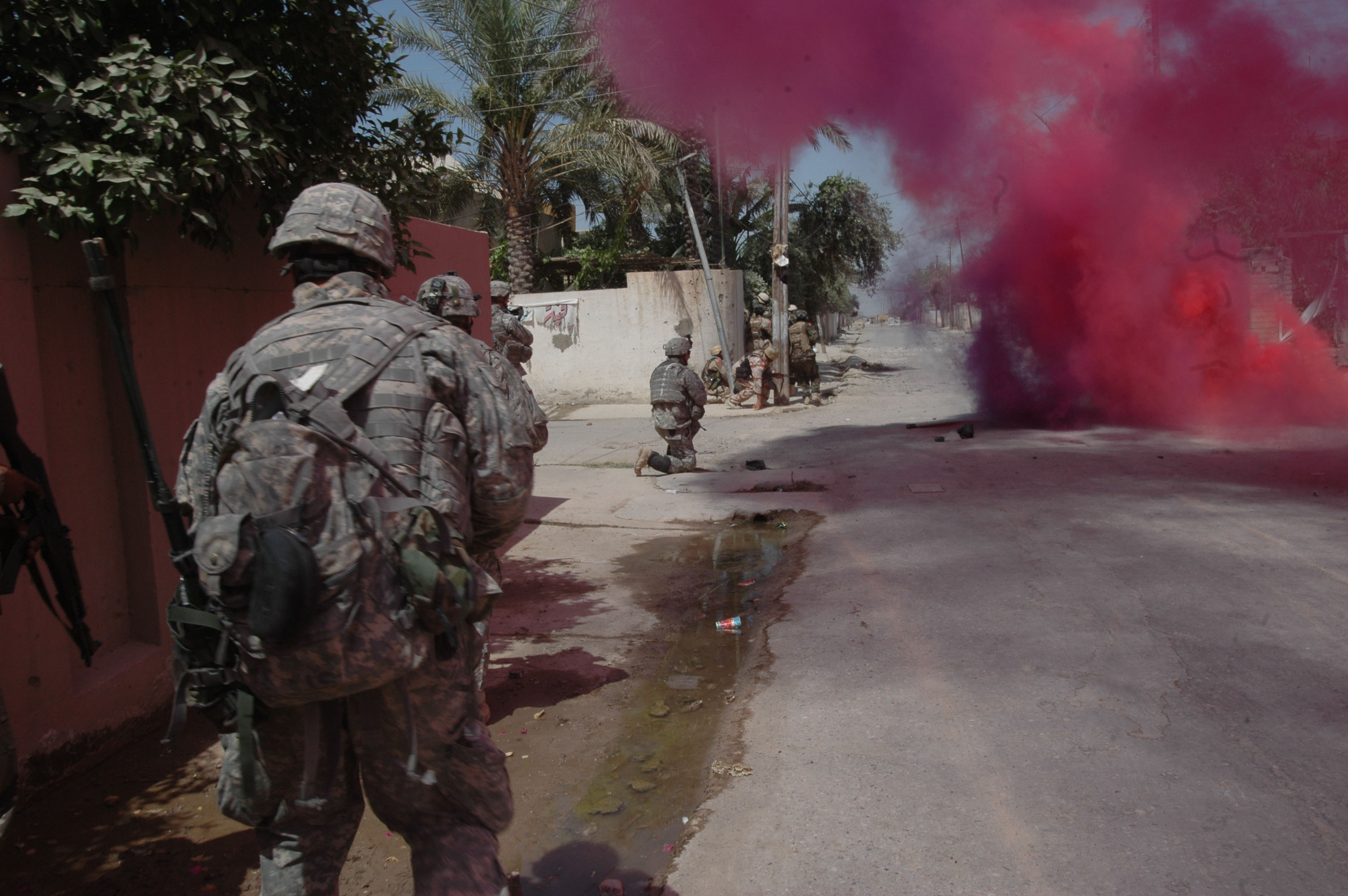
Soldiers from the 5th Iraqi Army Division, run through a smoke screen in Baqubah, Iraq, June 22, 2007, as Soldiers from the 3rd Stryker Brigade Combat Team, 2nd Infantry Division follow

In mid-June the U.S. mounted an offensive against Baghdad's northern and southern flanks. In the north an operation dubbed "Arrowhead Ripper" was started with air assaults under the cover of darkness in Baqubah. Heavy street fighting lasted throughout the first day of the operation, mainly in the center of the city and around the main city market. On the first day of the operation 22 insurgents and one U.S. soldier were killed. The next week saw U.S. forces trying to take Baqubah back from the insurgents. The attack on the city came from the west but was complicated by a maze of booby-trapped houses. It took the Americans a week before they secured 80 percent of the western section of the city. The insurgents already had intelligence that the U.S. army was going to attack the city and evacuated up to 80 percent of its principal leadership long before the operation.

After a month of street battles the fighting ceased in large parts of the city but the town of Al Khalis, approx. 15 km to the north, seemed to have become a major restaging point for insurgents retreating form Baqubah, despite the nearby presence of significant US forces at FOB Grizzly and People's Mujahedin of Iran personnel at "Ashraf City". By July 9, the focus of operations seemed to have shifted to the Baghdad-Baqubah road SW of the town.

On August 19, operation Arrowhead Ripper ended and Baqubah was largely secured by Coalition forces but still some insurgent presence remained in the city and surrounding areas but not in such large numbers as it was before the attack on the city.

=== Al-Qaeda strikes back ===
On September 24, a suicide bomber attacked a meeting of Iraqi high-level officials of Diyala province in Baquba. The attacker detonated a suicide belt inside the Shifta Shiite mosque in western Baquba during the daily breaking of the Ramadan fast. In all 28 people were killed and 50 were wounded. Among the dead were Baquba police Chief Ali al-Deylan and Brig. Gen. Abdul Karim al-Obaidi, commander of Diyala's police operations. Another slain official was Ahmed al-Tamimi, the head of the local Shiite Endowment, which administers Shiite religious facilities in the province. Two guards of the Diyala's Shiite governor, Raad Rashid Mullah Jawad, were killed. The governor himself was wounded and one of the dead guards was his brother. The dead also included Sheik Ahmed al-Tamer and Sheik Kanaan al-Faraj, both leaders of two former insurgent groups who became U.S.-allied Iraqi militias.

=== Mass graves ===
After Coalition troops entered previously insurgent-held territories of the province they started to find in November large numbers of mass graves, mostly around Baqubah, which contained anywhere from 10 to 20 bodies. It was believed that the victims were civilians picked up by ISI elements at check-points while ISI was in control of the area. The bodies of more than 100 people were found in just one week. By late April 2008, more than 500 bodies were recovered.

== Further operations ==
In January 2008 the Multinational Force Iraq and New Iraqi Army launched a new offensive (codenamed Operation Phantom Phoenix) in the region to eradicate the remaining insurgents in Diyala and the neighboring Salah ad Din Governorate.
