= Lebanese Palestinian Dialogue Committee =

- لجنة الحوار اللبناني الفلسطيني
- Abbreviation: LPDC
- Formation: 2005
- Headquarters: Beirut
- Website: www.lpdc.gov.lb

The Lebanese-Palestinian Dialogue Committee (LPDC), originally called the Lebanese Working Group on Palestinian Refugees, is an inter-ministerial government body formed in November 2005 by Lebanese Council of Ministers’ decision 41/2005. Its mission is to implement the policies of the Lebanese government towards Palestinian refugees in Lebanon.

LPDC plays a consultative role to the government, bringing expertise from various areas, in coordinating policies across ministries and making recommendations at the policy level. The LPDC is the interlocutor and focal point between the Palestinian refugees, Lebanese State institutions, ministries, Palestinian factions, Lebanese parties, civil society, United Nations partners and international and local stakeholders. It also coordinates work with UNRWA, the PLO, and Lebanese and Palestinian counterparts and civil society to achieve its mission.

Under the Presidency of the Council of Ministers, the LPDC provides policy recommendations to the Government of Lebanon based on the national interest of the Lebanese people and the rights of Palestinian refugees to live in dignity and respect, until their right of return is realized. This strategic advantage enables LPDC to build consensus and address taboos over the Palestinian presence in Lebanon through facilitating dialogue.

== LPDC Committee ==
Under the current cabinet of Prime Minister Nawaf Salam, an inter-ministerial committee was assigned to address the issue of Palestinian refugees in Lebanon. The committee features 12 representatives from key line ministries, chaired by the LPDC Chairman Ramez Dimechkie and appointed by the Prime Minister.

As per the original decree No. (89/2005), the LPDC is mandated to:

- Improve the living conditions of Palestinians residing in and outside refugee camps in Lebanon, in collaboration with UNRWA;
- Initiate dialogue to manage the issue of arms inside the camps;
- To eliminate arms outside the camps;
- To study opportunities to establish diplomatic relations and representation between Lebanon and Palestine.

The committee meets to discuss the issues outlined in their mandate. Recommendations for administrative and legal reforms and amendments to long-standing procedures and policies are made with the aim of improving the conditions and rights granted to Palestinian refugees living in Lebanon.

An updated decree, Resolution No. 40/2022 was issued to reaffirm the importance and timeliness of the mandate of LPDC, updated to

- Address the needs of the Palestinians living in Lebanon and the livelihood, social, economic, and human rights concerns in the camps, in cooperation with the United Nations Relief and Works Agency for Palestine Refugees in Lebanon (UNRWA), and other relevant international and national institutions;
- Establish a mechanism to end the presence of Palestinian weapons outside the camps;
- Work to address the issue of organizing and managing weapons inside the camps;
- Coordinate with public institutions and organizations to implement the state's public policy towards the Palestinian file in Lebanon.

== The Mandate ==
Alongside the committee, the LPDC team pursues a mandate. This includes, but is not limited to, the following activities:

- Provide technical support and assistance in the application of government policy and in all efforts and events relating to Palestinian refugees in Lebanon
- Coordination between the various ministries in the application of government policy
- Coordination with UNRWA on a range of issues including some urgent infrastructure projects included in UNRWA's Medium Term plan and Nahr el-Bared crisis affairs
- Dialogue with the various Palestinian groups and civil society
- Coordination with the international and Arab donor countries to raise funds for implementing the new policy
- Raise awareness among both Lebanese and Palestinians, and promote dialogue and understanding
- Maintain contact with Lebanese political parties, religious leaders and civil society to promote government policy
- Participate in relief operations and coordinate the movement of the recovery and reconstruction process of NBC camps
- Liaise with local and international NGOs

== LPDC Chairperson ==
The LPDC Chairperson is appointed by the Prime Minister of Lebanon.

Term of Office	Prime Minister	Government Cabinet	Chairperson of the Committee
From April 2025 - Present	Nawaf Salam	'Reform and Rescue'	Ambassador Ramez Dimechkie
November 2021 - March 2025	Najib Mikati	'Together for the Rescue'	Dr. Bassel Al Hassan
April 2014 - November 2021	Tammam Salam	'National Interest'	Dr. Hassan Mneimneh
June 2012 - April 2014	Najib Mikati	'All for Work'	Dr. Khaldoun Al Sharif
July 2011 - June 2012	Najib Mikati	'All for Work'	Ambassador Abdelmajid Kassir
November 2009 - July 2011	Saad Hariri	'Development Government'	Me. Maya Majzoub
July 2008 - June 2009	Fouad Siniora	'The Unity National Will Government'	Ambassador Khalil Makkawi
November 2005 - July 2008	Fouad Siniora	'Reform and Recovery'	Ambassador Khalil Makkawi
