= Al-Qaeda in Iraq =

Salafi jihadist militant group (2004–2006)

- القاعدة في العراق; Al-Qāʿidah fī al-ʿIrāq
- One of several flags used by AQI; others used white for the circle and the shahada
- Leaders: Abu Musab al-Zarqawi † (17 October 2004 – 7 June 2006); Abu Ayyub al-Masri (7 June 2006 – 15 October 2006)
- Dates active: 17 October 2004 – 15 October 2006
- Active regions: Iraq
- Ideology: Salafi jihadism Anti-Shi'ism; Qutbism
- Part of: Al-Qaeda

Al-Qaeda in Iraq (Note: Arabic: القاعدة في العراق, romanized: Al-Qāʿidah fī al-ʿIrāq) (Note: Formally known as Organization of Jihad's Base in Mesopotamia (Arabic: تنظيم قاعدة الجهاد في بلاد الرافدين, romanized: Tanẓīm Qāʿidat al-Jihād fī Bilād ar-Rāfidayn).) (AQI) was a Salafi jihadist terrorist organization affiliated with al-Qaeda. It was founded on 17 October 2004, and was led by Abu Musab al-Zarqawi until his death on 7 June 2006, when he was killed in a targeted bombing in Hibhib, Iraq by the United States Air Force. On October 15, the organization was dissolved to establish the Islamic State of Iraq.

The group originated as Jama'at al-Tawhid wal-Jihad in 1999. In 2004 al-Zarqawi pledged allegiance to Osama bin Laden. Under the leadership of al-Zarqawi, AQI was engaged in various militant activities during the early stages of the Iraqi insurgency, with the objective of expelling the U.S.-led coalition and establishing an Islamic state in Iraq. In January 2006, AQI and seven other Sunni guerrilla groups formed the Mujahideen Shura Council (MSC), which on 15 October 2006 disbanded to form the "Islamic State of Iraq."

== History ==
The group was founded by Jordanian national Abu Musab al-Zarqawi in 1999 under the name Jama'at al-Tawhid wal-Jihad (Arabic: جماعة التوحيد والجهاد, lit. 'Congregation of Monotheism and Jihad'). The group is believed to have started bomb attacks in Iraq as of August 2003, five months after the 2003 invasion of Iraq and the Iraq War, targeting UN representatives, Iraqi Shiite institutions, the Jordanian embassy, provisional Iraqi government institutions. After it pledged allegiance to Osama bin Laden's al-Qaeda network in October 2004, its official name became Tanzim Qaidat al-Jihad fi Bilad al-Rafidayn.

== Leadership ==
On 7 June 2006, the leader, Abu Musab al-Zarqawi, and his spiritual adviser Abu Abdul Rahman, were both killed by a U.S. airstrike with two 500 lb (230 kg) bombs on a safe house near Baqubah. The group's leadership was then assumed by the Egyptian militant Abu Ayyub al-Masri, also known as Abu Hamza al-Muhajir.

== Purpose ==
In a letter to al-Zarqawi in July 2005, Al-Qaeda's Ayman al-Zawahiri outlined a four-stage plan beginning with taking control of Iraq. Step 1: expulsion of US forces from Iraq. Step 2: establishing in Iraq an Islamic authority—a caliphate. Step 3: "the jihad wave" should be extended to "the secular countries neighbouring Iraq". Step 4: "the clash with Israel".

== Operations ==
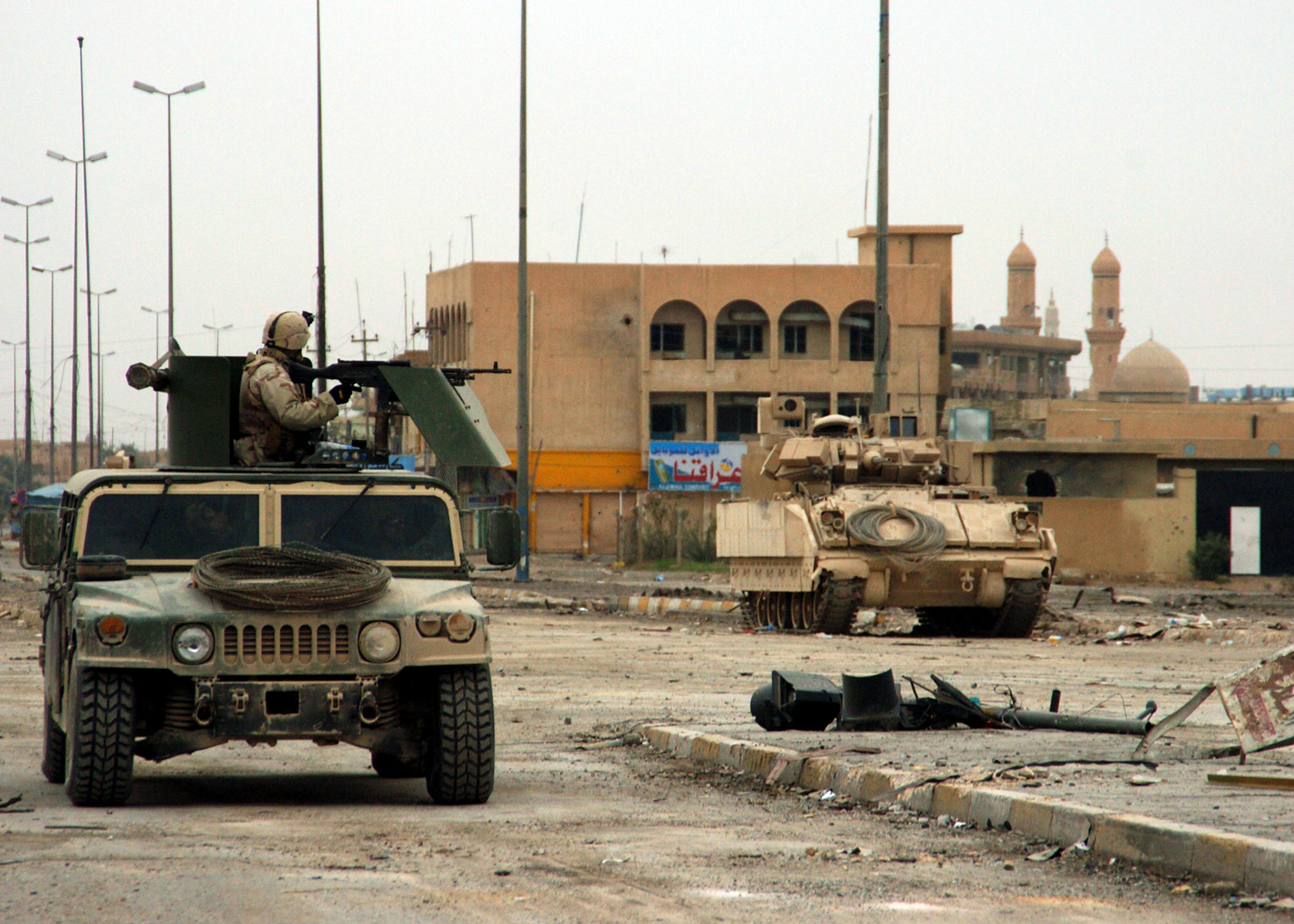
US Navy Seabees during the Second Battle of Fallujah (November 2004)

=== 2004 ===
At the end of October 2004, al-Qaeda in Iraq kidnapped Japanese citizen Shosei Koda. In an online video, AQI gave Japan 48 hours to withdraw its troops from Iraq, otherwise Koda's fate would be "the same as that of his predecessors, [Nicholas] Berg and [Kenneth] Bigley and other infidels". While Japan refused to comply with this demand, Koda was beheaded, and his decapitated body found on 30 October.

=== 2005 ===
According to internal documents seized in 2008, AQI began in 2005 systematically killing Iraqi tribesmen and nationalist insurgents wherever they began to rally against it.

Attacks in 2005 claimed by AQI include:

- 30 January: AQI launched attacks on voters during the Iraqi legislative election in January. In 100 armed attacks, 44 people were killed, although some attacks may have been carried out by other groups. Abu Musab al-Zarqawi said: "We have declared a fierce war on this evil principle of democracy (...)".
- 28 February: in the southern city of Hillah, a car bomb struck a crowd of police and Iraqi National Guard recruits, killing 125 people.
- 2 April: the group launched a combined suicide and conventional attack on Abu Ghraib prison in April.
- 7 May: in Baghdad, two explosives-laden cars were used against an American security company convoy. 22 people are killed, including two Americans.
- 6 July: AQI claimed responsibility for the kidnapping and execution of Egypt's ambassador to Iraq, Ihab el-Sherif. In a message posted on the Internet, al-Zarqawi said: "The Islamic court of the al-Qaeda Organization in the Land of Two Rivers has decided to refer the ambassador of the state of Egypt, an ally of the Jews and the Christians, to the mujahideens so that they can execute him."
- 15–17 July: a three-day series of suicide attacks, including the Musayyib marketplace bombing, left 150 people dead and 260 wounded. AQI claimed that the bombings were part of a campaign to take control of Baghdad.
- 19 August: In the Jordanian city of Aqaba, a rocket attack kills a Jordanian soldier.
- 14 September: AQI claimed responsibility for a single-day series of more than a dozen bombings in Baghdad, which killed about 160 people, most of whom were unemployed Shia workers. Al-Zarqawi declared "all-out war" on Shiites, Iraqi troops and the Iraqi government in a statement.
- Friday 16 September: a suicide bomb attack outside a Shiite mosque 200 km north of Baghdad killed 13 worshippers.
- 24 October: AQI made coordinated suicide attacks outside the Sheraton Ishtar and Palestine Hotel in Baghdad in October.
- 9 November: in the Jordanian capital Amman, three bomb attacks against hotels killed 60 people.
- 18 November: AQI claimed responsibility for a series of Shia mosque bombings in the city of Khanaqin, which killed at least 74 people.

=== 2006 ===
- The 5 January bombings on Shi'ite civilians in Karbala and Ramadi, near a religious shrine and a police recruiting centre, were blamed by some residents on al Qaeda in Iraq.
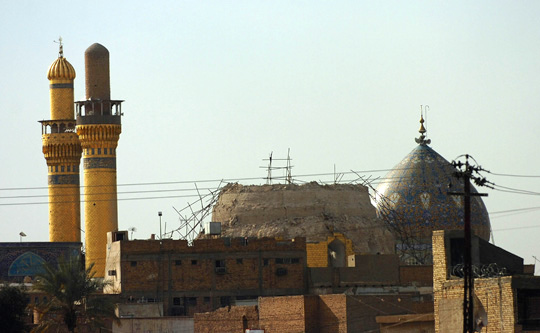
  The Al-Askari Mosque, one of the holiest sites in Shia Islam, after the first attack by Al-Qaeda in Iraq in 2006
- The 22 February 2006 al-Askari Mosque bombing was blamed by a U.S. intelligence officer in March 2007 and by 'Iraqi officials' in May 2007, on AQI.
- On 3 June 2006, AQI abducted and killed four Russian diplomats in Iraq.
- 16 June 2006, a U.S. checkpoint near Baghdad was attacked, one U.S. soldier killed and two abducted. Those abducted, Thomas Lowell Tucker and Kristian Menchaca, were found on 19 June, having been tortured and killed. The next day, Mujahedeen Shura Council of Iraq (MSC)—an organization including Tanzim Qaidat al-Jihad fi Bilad al-Rafidayn—claimed to have "slaughtered" the two Americans. Three weeks later, MSC issued a video showing the mutilated corpses of Tucker and Menchada, purportedly as revenge for the rape and murder of an Iraqi girl, in March 2006, by U.S. soldiers of the same brigade.

Autumn 2006, AQI took over Baqubah, the capital of Diyala Governorate, and before March 2007, AQI or its umbrella organization 'Islamic State of Iraq' (ISI) claimed Baqubah as its capital.

- The US suggested that 'al Qaeda' was involved in the wave of chlorine bombings in Iraq, October 2006–June 2007, which affected hundreds of people, albeit with few fatalities.

Further violent activities in Iraq after 13 October 2006 blamed on 'al Qaeda (in Iraq)' are listed in article Islamic State of Iraq (ISI).

== Sunni–Shia civil war ==
September 2005, after a U.S.-Iraqi offensive on the town of Tal Afar, al-Zarqawi declared "all-out war" on Shia Muslims in Iraq. On 22 February 2006, unknown perpetrators (likely to be Sunni's) bombed the al-Askari Shia mosque, which started the two year-long Sunni–Shia civil war until its end on 15 May 2008. Various parties participated during the civil war, but the main combatants were sectarian Shia and Sunni armed groups, such as the Islamic State of Iraq and the Mahdi Army, in addition to the Iraqi government alongside American-led coalition forces.

Waves of attacks on Sunni civilians by Shia militants started, followed by attacks on Shia civilians by Sunni militants. The conflict escalated over the next several months until by late 2007, the National Intelligence Estimate described the conflict as having elements of a civil war. In 2008, during the Sunni Awakening and the U.S. troop surge, violence declined dramatically.

== Conflicts between Al Qaeda in Iraq and other Sunni Iraqi groups ==
In September–October 2005, there were signs of a split between homegrown Iraqi Sunni Arab insurgents who wanted Sunni influence in national politics restored, and therefore supported a "no" vote in the 15 October 2005 referendum on a constitution, and al-Zarqawi's Al Qaeda in Iraq, which strove for a theocratic state and threatened to kill those who engaged in the national political process with Shiites and Kurds, including those who would take part in that referendum.

From mid-2006, AQI began to be pushed out of their strongholds in rural Anbar Province, from Fallujah to Qaim, by tribal leaders in open war. That campaign was assisted by the Iraqi government paying cash gifts and alleged salaries to tribal sheikhs of up to $5,000 a month. In September 2006, 30 tribes in Anbar Province formed an alliance called the "Anbar Awakening" to fight AQI.

== January 2006: AQI creates Mujahideen Shura Council ==
Shosei Koda before his beheading

AQI's efforts to recruit Iraqi Sunni nationalist and secular groups were undermined by its violent tactics against civilians and by its fundamentalist doctrine. In January 2006 it created an umbrella organization called the Mujahideen Shura Council (MSC), in an attempt to unify Sunni insurgents in Iraq.

=== Strength of AQI in 2004–2006 ===
American military field leaders, in particular, Lt. General Michael Flynn, in late spring 2004, were 'strategically surprised' at the capabilities, scale of operations, and quality of leadership of the subject. Western media suggested that foreign fighters continued to flock to AQI. A secret U.S. Marine Corps intelligence report of August 2006 wrote that Iraq's Sunni minority had been increasingly abandoned by their religious and political leaders who had fled or been assassinated, was "embroiled in a daily fight for survival", feared "pogroms" by the Shiite majority, and was increasingly dependent on Al-Qaeda in Iraq as its only hope against growing Syrian dominance across Baghdad.

In western Iraq, AQI was entrenched, autonomous and financially independent, and therefore the death of AQI leader Al-Zarqawi in June 2006 had little impact on the structure or capabilities of AQI. Illicit oil trading provided them with millions of dollars, and their popularity was rising in western Iraq.

In Anbar, most government institutions had disintegrated by August 2006, and AQI was the dominant power, the U.S. Marine Corps intelligence report said. In 2006, the State Department's Bureau of Intelligence and Research estimated that Al-Qaeda in Iraq's core membership was "more than 1,000".

== October 2006: AQI creates Islamic State of Iraq ==
On 13 October 2006, the MSC declared the establishment of the Islamic State of Iraq (ISI), comprising Iraq's six mostly Sunni Arab governorates: Baghdad, Anbar, Diyala, Kirkuk, Salah al-Din, Ninawa, and "other parts of the governorate of Babel", with Abu Omar al-Baghdadi being announced as the self-proclaimed state's Emir. A Mujahideen Shura Council leader said: "God willing we will set the law of Sharia here and we will fight the Americans"; the Council urged on Sunni Muslim tribal leaders to join their separate Islamic state "to protect our religion and our people, to prevent strife and so that the blood and sacrifices of your martyrs are not lost".

Following the announcement, scores of gunmen took part in military parades in Ramadi and other Anbar towns to celebrate. In reality, the group did not control territory in Iraq.

In November, a statement was issued by Abu Ayyub al-Masri, leader of Mujahideen Shura Council (MSC), announcing the disbanding of the MSC, in favor of the ISI. After this statement, there were a few more claims of responsibility issued under the name of the Mujahideen Shura Council, but these eventually ceased and were totally replaced by claims from the Islamic State of Iraq.

In April 2007, Abu Ayyub al-Masri was given the title of 'Minister of War' within the ISI's ten-member cabinet.

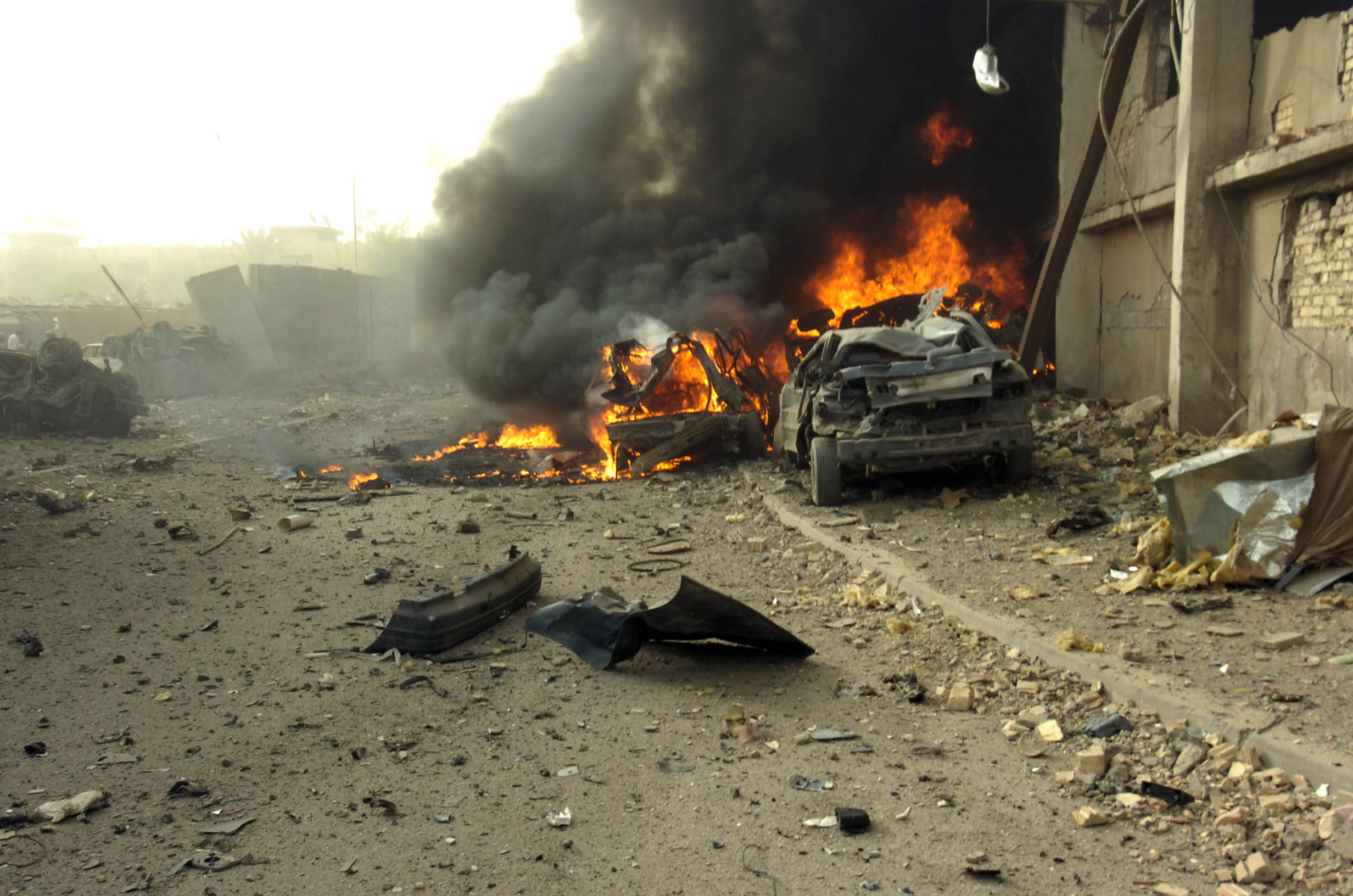
Car bombings were a common form of attack in Iraq during the Coalition occupation

According to a report by US intelligence agencies in May 2007, the ISI planned to seize power in the central and western areas of the country and turn it into a Sunni Islamic state.

By June 2007, the uncompromising brand of extreme fundamentalist Islam of AQI and the ISI had alienated more nationalist Iraqi strands of insurgency.

== U.S. fighting Al-Qaeda in Iraq ==
In November 2004, al-Zarqawi's network was the main target of the US Operation Phantom Fury in Fallujah, but its leadership managed to escape the American siege and subsequent storming of the city.

On 7 June 2006, al-Zarqawi and his spiritual adviser Sheik Abd-Al-Rahman, were both killed by a U.S. airstrike with two 500 lb (230 kg) bombs on a safe house near Baqubah. The group's leadership was then assumed by Abu Ayyub al-Masri, also known as Abu Hamza al-Muhajir.

== Criticisms from al-Zawahiri ==
U.S. intelligence in October 2005 published an intercepted letter purportedly from Ayman al-Zawahiri questioning AQI's tactic of indiscriminately attacking Shias in Iraq.

In a video that appeared in December 2007, al-Zawahiri defended AQI, but distanced himself from the crimes against civilians committed by "hypocrites and traitors" that he said existed among its ranks.

== Operations outside Iraq and other activities ==
On 3 December 2004, AQI attempted unsuccessfully to blow up an Iraqi–Jordanian border crossing. In 2006 a Jordanian court sentenced al-Zarqawi and two of his associates to death in absentia for their involvement in the plot. AQI claimed to have carried out three attacks outside Iraq in 2005. In the most deadly, suicide bombs killed 60 people in Amman, Jordan on 9 November 2005. They claimed responsibility for the rocket attacks which narrowly missed the American naval ships USS Kearsarge and USS Ashland in Jordan, and also targeted the city of Eilat in Israel, and for the firing of several rockets into Israel from Lebanon in December 2005. The affiliated groups were linked to regional attacks outside Iraq which were consistent with their stated plan, one example being the 2005 Sharm El Sheikh bombings in Egypt, which killed 88 people, many of them foreign tourists.

The Lebanese-Palestinian militant group Fatah al-Islam, which was defeated by Lebanese government forces during the 2007 Lebanon conflict, was linked to AQI and led by al-Zarqawi's former companion who had fought alongside him in Iraq. The group may have been linked to the little-known group called "Tawhid and Jihad in Syria", and may have influenced the Palestinian militant group in Gaza called Jahafil Al-Tawhid Wal-Jihad fi Filastin.

== See also ==
- Territory of Al-Qaeda in Iraq
- Islamic terrorism
- List of bombings during the Iraq War
