= Abbas Zaki =

PLO member

Abbas Zaki (Arabic: عباس زكي) is the former representative of the Palestine Liberation Organization (PLO) in Lebanon and a member of Fatah's central committee.

== Views ==
As a result of the conflict in the Nahr al-Bared Camp in Lebanon, Zaki proposed setting up a Palestinian security force of 4,000 to 5,000 members in the refugee camps in Lebanon to prevent the formation of extremist groups.

Zaki described Fatah al-Islam as "an ignorant group, hiding themselves behind Islam, and practicing the most ugly crimes against women and children in the camp of Nahr al Barid." In May 2009, Zaki suggested that if unity talks between Hamas and Fatah in Cairo fail, Abbas should form a new government that will lay out a new approach to Hamas.

Ahead of Fatah's sixth conference on August 4, 2009, Zaki stated "I'm sorry to compare, but the Israelis elected Lieberman and appointed him as Foreign Minister, and a similar mistake was made by the Palestinian people in electing Hamas, which is setting up all the obstacles preventing the improvement of the national unity."

Zaki has made a number of controversial statements. In 2023, he expressed support for Hamas's October 7 attack, a statement that was later disavowed by another Fatah official, who clarified that it did not represent the group's official position.

== See also ==
- List of Fatah members
