= François al-Hajj =

Lebanese major general (1953–2007)

François al-Hajj فرنسوا الحاج
- Born: 28 July 1953; Rmaich – Bint Jbeil, Lebanon
- Died: 12 December 2007 (aged 54) Baabda, Lebanon
- Buried: Rmaich
- Allegiance: Lebanon
- Branch: Lebanese Ground Forces
- Service years: 1972–2007
- Rank: Major General
- Commands: Commando Regiment (1996–2002); Third Intervention Regiment (1992–1996)
- Conflicts: Lebanese Civil War; 1982 Lebanon War; War of Liberation; Dinnieh clashes; 2007 Lebanon conflict

Major General François al-Hajj (Arabic: اللواء فرنسوا الحاج; Arabic pronunciation: [franswaː al-haːʤ], 28 July 1953 – 12 December 2007) was a Lebanese military officer. He was assassinated by a car bomb on 12 December 2007.

== Early life and education ==
Al Hajj was born in the southern Lebanese town of Rmaich on 28 July 1953. Hajj entered the military academy in 1972 and graduated in 1975.

== Military career ==
Al Hajj fought against the Israeli occupation in South Lebanon and was then transferred to head positions north of the Litani during the 1980s. From 1988 to 1989 he fought, under the leadership of Prime Minister General Aoun, against Syrian forces assaulting the "free zones" of West Beirut during the Lebanese Civil War, he also battled the Lebanese Forces militia. In addition, General Hajj, led the Lebanese Army operation in Dinnieh in 2000. He gained recognition as a brilliant commander during the 15-week operation against Fatah al-Islam in Nahr al-Bared camp northern Lebanon during Summer 2007. He was second in command in the Lebanese army and would have been a contender to replace General Sleiman in the event the latter was elected president. Hajj was promoted to the rank of major general after his killing.

== Assassination ==
On 12 December 2007, Hajj was assassinated through a car bomb blast in the suburb of Baabda. Four other people, including his bodyguard, also died in the attack. A BMW that contained 35 kilograms of TNT was exploded while Hajj's car drove by. The bomb was triggered by remote control.

== Honors and medals ==
General Francois Hajj received the following honors and medals:

- Medal of War
- Order of the Wounded
- National Cedar Medal of Honor
- Lebanese Order of Merit (3rd degree)
- Order of National Unity
- Order of the Dawn of the South
- Lebanese Order of Merit (1st class)
- National Cedar Medal
- Medal of Loyalty
- Cedar Medal of National Honor
- Commended by the Army Commander over 24 times.

== See also ==
- List of assassinated Lebanese politicians
- List of extrajudicial killings and political violence in Lebanon
