= 2008 Damascus car bombing =

Terrorist incident in Syria

2008 Damascus car bomb
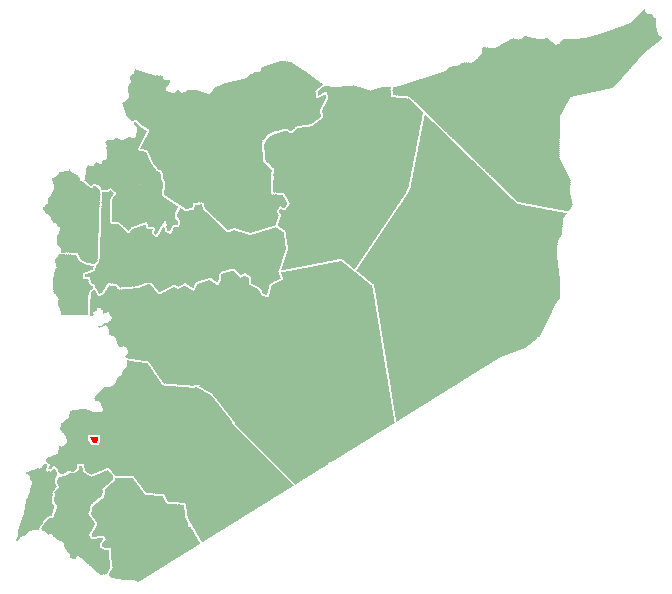
- Damascus highlighted within Syria
- Location: Damascus, Syria
- Date: 27 September 2008; 8:45 a.m. (Local time)
- Weapon: Car bomb
- Deaths: 17
- Injuries: 14

The 2008 Damascus car bombing was a car bombing that occurred on 27 September 2008 in the Syrian capital of Damascus. The explosion left 17 people dead and 14 injured. A car, laden with 200 kilograms (440 pounds) of explosives detonated in the Sidi Kadad suburb of the capital, at approximately 8:45am. The blast occurred roughly 100 metres from a security installation on the road to Damascus International Airport at an intersection leading to the Sayyidah Zaynab Mosque, popular with Shia pilgrims from Iran and Lebanon. Security forces cordoned off the area.

It was the first major explosion in Syria since the car bomb assassination of Imad Mughniyah, a high-ranking military commander in Hezbollah in February 2008, and also the most lethal bomb attack in Syria since 1996. It was the deadliest since a spate of attacks in the 1980s blamed on the Muslim Brotherhood left nearly 150 dead.

No group or individual has claimed responsibility for the attack.

At the time, such attacks were rare in Syria and the blast was seen as the worst threat to national security in many years.

== Background ==
The attack followed two politically motivated assassinations in Syria that occurred in 2008. The first took place when Hezbollah member Imad Moughniyah was killed by a car bomb in February 2008. The second occurred only a month before the car bombing in Damascus, when General Mohammed Suleiman, a high-ranking aide to President Bashar al-Assad was killed in Tartous.

Syria also experienced riots at a prison near Damascus earlier in the year. These events were all highly irregular, as Syria maintains a generally well-held grip on internal security.

== Target ==
Though the blast was believed to be targeted towards a senior intelligence official, only civilians were killed. Others, including a traffic policeman, were harmed in the attack. Asharq Alawsat reported that a brigadier-general was killed, and that the building was used by the Palestine branch of Syrian Military Intelligence.

The official SANA news agency said authorities were conducting DNA tests to identify the attacker and that several people have been detained in connection with the attack. According to their report, the attacker belonged to a Muslim extremist group and that the car crossed into Syria from a neighbouring Arab country.

A witness had told the Reform Party of Syria that the blast occurred after the car pulled out of a car depot belonging to the Palestine Branch, a group that is part of Syrian Intelligence. Sources have said the car was fitted with the explosives while inside the depot, leading to speculation the explosion was a 'work accident.' The party reported on their website that most of those killed in the bombing were intelligence officials, contrary to government claims that all of the casualties were civilian.

== Perpetrators ==
In November 2008, Syrian television aired the purported confessions of 10 radicals for their role in the bombing. They were all members of the Fatah al-Islam group, an al-Qaeda-inspired organisation based in northern Lebanon. Among them was Wafa Abssi, daughter of Fatah al-Islam leader Shaker al-Abssi.

The programme also said the suicide bomber was a Saudi national.

== Reactions ==
Syrian Interior Minister Bassam Abdel Majeed condemned the car bombing as a "cowardly terrorist act.", and also said on state television that "we cannot accuse any party. There are ongoing investigations that will lead us to those who carried it out."

Foreign secretary David Miliband of the United Kingdom said, "Such acts of terrorism can have no justification, and must be condemned without reservation. My condolences and sympathies go out to all those who have suffered as a result of these atrocities."

Russia, France and the United States also condemned the bombing.

Saudi Arabia, which has long had a tense relationship with Syria, is the only country in the Arab world which has not condemned the bombing.

== See also ==
- List of terrorist incidents in 2008
