= Battle of Turki =

Military engagement

- Part of the Iraq War
Date	15–16 November 2006 (1 day)
Location	Turki, Iraq (near Baqubah)
Result	U.S. victory

Belligerents
United States	Islamic State of Iraq

Commanders and leaders
Lt. Col. Andrew Poppas	Abu Abdul Rahman

Strength
50 paratroopers	Unknown

Casualties and losses
2 killed Unknown wounded	72 killed 20 captured

The Battle of Turki, also known as Operation TURKI BOWL I, was fought over 40 hours near the town of Baqubah, Iraq, on the outskirts of the village of Turki in Diyala Governorate between American paratroopers of the 82nd Airborne Division and well trained insurgent forces in November 2006.

== Prelude ==
There have been very few major engagements since the battle for the Euphrates river valley, Al Anbar, in May and November 2005. But that didn't mean the well trained units of insurgents were all destroyed. Sunni Arab militant groups suspected of ties to Al-Qaeda in Iraq established training camps east of Baghdad that turned out well-disciplined units willing to fight American forces in set-piece battles. American paratroopers fought such units in a pitched battle in the village of Turki in the volatile Diyala Governorate, near the Iranian border.

Insurgents were apparently able to establish a training camp after American combat forces moved out of the area in the fall of 2005. Sunni Arab militants there belong to the fundamentalist Wahabbi sect of Islam and are believed to be led, at least in part, by a man known as Abu Abdul Rahman, an Iraqi-Canadian who moved from Canada to Iraq in 1995 after marrying a woman from Turki.

Senior US commanders training Iraqi Army units said other rural areas of eastern and central Diyala where American forces had little oversight were transformed into camps similar to the one at Turki. The "graduates," many of whom belong to an umbrella group called the Sunni Council, then spread to urban areas such as Baqubah, the provincial capital. Sectarian violence was rampant in Diyala, where Sunni and Shiite militants were vying for control.

== The battle ==
The battle at Turki began after Lt. Col. Andrew Poppas, commander of the 5th Squadron, 73rd Cavalry, a unit of the 82nd Airborne Division, and other soldiers flew over the area on a reconnaissance mission on November 12. From the helicopters of C Co. 1/150th Aviation of West Virginia, crewchiefs spotted a white car covered by shrubbery and a hole in the ground that appeared to be a hiding place. The colonel dropped off an eight-man team and later sent other soldiers to sweep the area.

Gunfire erupted on November 15 when C Troop paratroopers ran into an ambush near the village of Turki. Several insurgents feigned surrender to lure American troops out of their up-armored humvees and onto the ground. This tactic would be repeated to draw in members from A and B Troops in other locations. Officers said that in this battle, unlike the vast majority of engagements in Diyala, insurgents stood and fought, even deploying a platoon-sized unit that showed remarkable discipline and that one captain said was in "perfect military formation." Insurgents throughout Iraq usually avoid direct confrontation with the Americans, preferring to use hit-and-run tactics and melting away at the sight of American armored vehicles. The insurgents had built a labyrinth network of trenches in the farmland, with sleeping areas and significant weapons caches. Two anti-aircraft guns had been hidden away. The fighting eventually became so intense that the Americans called in airstrikes, provided by both helicopter gunships and F16s. American commanders said they called in 12 hours of airstrikes while soldiers shot their way through a reed-strewn network of canals in extremely close combat. The fighting lasted for more than 40 hours. High level terrorist leaders were thought to have been present. The stiff resistance from insurgent fighters was believed to have given these leaders time to escape.

In the end the 5th Squadron managed to destroy the insurgent trench system established in the area. Six insurgent weapons caches were also uncovered during the battle. The caches included more than 400,000 rounds of small-arms ammunition, 15,000 rounds of heavy machine gun ammunition, five mortar bipods, three heavy machine guns, three anti-tank weapons, two recoilless rifles and numerous mortar rounds, grenades, flares and other artillery rounds. But many more insurgent training camps remain in the area. An American captain and a lieutenant, both West Point graduates, were killed in the battle along with 72 insurgents and 20 insurgents were captured.

== Aftermath ==
On May 25, 2011, the 5th Squadron, 73rd Cavalry was recognized for their actions during the Battle of Turki by the awarding of the Presidential Unit Citation. 5-73rd Cavalry is the only battalion sized unit to receive the PUC during Operation Iraqi Freedom and one of only seven awards total for combat operations in Iraq.
