= 2005 Khanaqin bombings =

Suicide attacks on Shia mosques in Khanaqin, Iraq

- Part of Iraqi insurgency (2003–2006) in Iraqi insurgency (2003–2011)
- Location: Khanaqin, Iraq
- Date: November 18, 2005 (UTC+3)
- Target: 2 Shiite mosques
- Attack type: car bombs
- Deaths: at least 74
- Injuries: more than 100
- Perpetrator: Unknown
- Motive: Anti-Shi'ism

2005 Khanaqin bombings were suicide attacks on two Shia mosques in Khanaqin, Iraq (near the Iranian border), on November 18, 2005.
