= 2007 Bikfaya bombings =

Terrorist incident in Bikfaya, Lebanon

- Location: near Bikfaya, Lebanon
- Date: 13 February 2007; 19 years ago
- Target: Christian passengers of two civilian buses
- Attack type: Bombings
- Deaths: 3
- Injuries: 21
- Perpetrator: Fatah al-Islam

The 2007 Bikfaya bombings were two blasts on buses near Bikfaya, Lebanon which killed three people and injured 21 others. The bombings heightened tensions in the country following the Cedar Revolution, and on the eve of the second anniversary of the assassination of Rafic Hariri.

== The bombings ==
On Tuesday, 13 February 2007, a bomb exploded on a bus transporting 26 people from Bteghrine to the Lebanese mountain village of Ain Alaq. A second bus following behind stopped, and then a bomb on that bus exploded. Killed were Michel Attar (born 1989), Laurice Gemayel, and Mahmoud Hammoud, an Egyptian laborer. A further 21 other people were injured.

The two bombings occurred on the eve of a Cedar Revolution rally planned to commemorate the second anniversary of the assassination of the former Lebanese prime minister, Rafik Hariri. The bombing occurred less than a mile from the Christian village of Bikfaya, the hometown of the former president, Amine Gemayel, whose son Pierre Gemayel, a cabinet minister and member of the anti-Syrian, March 14 Alliance, was assassinated by gunmen in November. Amin Gemayel, also a member of the March 14 Alliance, had just returned from the United States where he met with president George W. Bush in the White House on 8 February 2007. In addition to scaring the Lebanese from attending the Cedar Revolution the following day, many analysts also saw the bombings in Gemayel's stronghold of Metn as a Syrian warning to Gemayel who was a possible candidate for the Lebanese presidency. The bombings did not deter hundreds of thousands of flag-waving Lebanese, Christians, Muslims, and Druze, to gather in Martyr's Square in Beirut on February 14 to honor Hariri and show support for the anti-Syrian, pro-western government of Fouad Saniora.

== Reactions ==
- Amnesty International condemned the bombings and accused the perpetrators of the attacks of "showing complete disregard for the most fundamental principles of humanity."
- Egypt condemned the bombings.
- France condemned the bombings.
- Germany condemned the bombings.
- The United Kingdom condemned the bombings.
- Indonesia condemned the killing, calling it an act of terror that would hinder political reconciliation among the Lebanese.
- Prime Minister Fouad Siniora promised to pursue the criminals who murdered Attar, Gemayel and Hammoud. He believed that the terrorists were the same forces who assassinated Hariri in 2005. He said that the Lebanese will not be "scared or terrorized" and the terrorists will be brought to justice.
- The leaders of the March 14 Alliance accused the Syrian government of committing the bombings in Ain Alaq to deter the Lebanese from participating in the rally honoring the second anniversary of Hariri's assassination.
- The state-controlled media in Syria accused the March 14 Alliance and the anti-Syrian parliament majority of being behind the two bombings.
- On 15 February 2007, The U.N. condemned the two bombings, and the Security Council agreed to provide Lebanon with technical assistance to help probe the bombing that killed Michel Attar, Laurice Gemayel and Mahmoud Hammoud.

== Arrests and criminal charges ==
On 14 March 2007, Lebanese Internal Security, better known as the Sûreté Générale du Liban, arrested four Syrians who confessed to the bombings in Ain Alaq. The Lebanese Interior Minister, Hassan Al Sabaa, believed that the four Syrians were members of a radical Palestinian group, Fatah al-Islam, which allegedly has close ties to the Syrian intelligence agency. However, it was still not clear who actually ordered the attack. Syria denied the Lebanese allegations.

On 21 June 2007, Lebanese State Prosecutor Saeed Mirza filed charges against 16 Fatah al-Islam suspects accused of carrying out the bombings. Nine of the 16 suspects accused were in custody when the charges were filed; other, including Fatah al-Islam head Shaker al-Abssi were still being sought. The defendants include 10 Syrians, two Lebanese, three Palestinians (including one woman) and one Saudi national.

== See also ==
- 2005 Lebanon bombings
