= Abduction of Russian diplomats in Iraq =

2006 kidnapping and murder in Iraq

The 2006 abduction of Russian diplomats in Iraq took place on June 3, 2006, in Baghdad, Iraq when Iraqi insurgents ambushed a car belonging to the Russian Embassy. Vitaly Titov, (a security guard), was killed in the attack and the other four people in the car – Fyodor Zaitsev (the embassy Third Secretary), Rinat Agliuglin (a cook), Oleg Fedoseyev (a security guard), and Anatoly Smirnov (a driver) – were abducted.

On June 19, 2006, the Mujahedeen Shura Council, a group affiliated with al Qaeda, claimed responsibility for the attack and issuing an ultimatum to Russia to withdraw from Chechnya and release all Muslim prisoners within 48 hours. On June 25, the group issued a statement that it had beheaded three of the hostages and shot to death the fourth. The statement was accompanied by a video showing a few seconds of the beheading of one hostage, the beheaded corpse of a second hostage, and the shooting of a third. The execution of the fourth hostage is not shown.

== Aftermath ==
On June 28, Russian President Vladimir Putin ordered Russian security services to locate and kill those responsible for the kidnapping and execution of the diplomats. Nikolai Patrushev, the head of the Federal Security Service (FSB), the successor organisation of the KGB, noted that the order would be carried out regardless of the "time and effort" required.

A similar order was believed to have been issued against Zelimkhan Yandarbiyev, the one-time acting president of the former Chechen Republic of Ichkeria. Yandarbiyev was killed by a bomb in Doha, Qatar in February 2004.

However, Aleksandr Goltz, a Russian military expert, questioned the ability of Russian intelligence agencies to carry out the assassination order in a country mired in civil war.

One of the kidnappers of the Russian diplomats was captured in December 2006. He admitted his involvement in the incident and is believed to have personally beheaded two of the diplomats. Another kidnapper was killed in a firefight with the U.S. military in October 2008. He is believed to have personally shot one of the hostages. Another kidnapper was captured and sentenced to death by the Iraqi government in May 2010.

The bodies of the four diplomats were found in 2012.
