= Shaker al-Absi =

Palestinian militant (1955–2008)

Abu Yusuf Shaker Yusuf Hasan al-Absi
- Born: 1955
- Died: 2008 (disputed)
- Other name: Šākir al-ʿAbsī
- Occupation: Fighter Pilot

Abu Yusuf Shaker Yusuf Hasan al-Absi (1955–2008?; Arabic: شاكر العبسي, romanized: Šākir al-ʿAbsī) was a veteran Palestinian guerrilla and Fatah al-Islam's leader. On December 10, 2008, Fatah al-Islam announced that al-Absi was believed to have been killed by Syrian security forces.

== Biography ==
Absi joined the Palestinian militants at a young age. He volunteered to fight with the Libyan army in Chad. Later he participated in the 1983 revolt at Lebanon against Yasser Arafat in Fatah al-Intifada, which was led by Abu Moussa Muragheh and Abu Khaled Amleh. He then fought in Afghanistan.

On June 21, 2007, al-Absi and 15 other accused Fatah al-Islam members were formally charged by Lebanese State Prosecutor Saeed Mirza in a criminal case accusing them of carrying out the February 13, 2007 bus bombings in the mountain village of Ain-Alaq. Al-Absi and other defendants were also charged with bombing two civilian buses on the eve of a Cedar Revolution rally planned to commemorate the second anniversary of the assassination of the former Lebanese prime minister, Rafik Hariri.

All accusations were denied by Fatah al Islam leader and his group, they have claimed that they were deliberately accused by Lebanese government to justify their elimination.

On September 2, 2007, al-Absi was allegedly killed in the north of Tripoli. A body believed to be al-Absi's has undergone DNA and blood tests, and the Lebanese army confirmed it to be his. A total of 39 Islamist militants were killed by Lebanese troops in a pre-dawn attempt to escape from the Palestinian refugee camp in which they had been besieged for three months by the Lebanese army.

However, a DNA test carried out on the body did not confirm his death. The body discovered belonged to a man in his thirties, while Absi was fifty-six at the time. The DNA was also compared to samples from his brother and daughter and found not to match.

In October 2008, al-Absi was reportedly captured in Syria. However, other reports had him still on the run. In November 2008, after a car bombing in Damascus, al-Absi's daughter Wafa was shown on Syrian TV along with other purported Fatah al-Islam members. On December 10, 2008, the group said Shaker al-Absi and two other members had been ambushed by the Syrian security forces in the small town of Jermana, south of Damascus, and that he had been killed or arrested.
