= Fatah al-Islam =

Palestinian militant group

- فتح الإسلام
- Flag of Fatah al-Islam
- Leaders: Shaker al-Abssi †; Abu Mohamad Awad †; Abu Hussam al Shami †
- Dates active: 2006–present
- Split from: Fatah al-Intifada
- Headquarters: Ain al-Hilweh; Nahr al-Bared (former)
- Active regions: Lebanon; Syria
- Ideology: Sunni Islamism; Jihadism; Anti-Zionism
- Size: ~200
- Wars: the 2007 Lebanon conflict and the Syrian Civil War

Fatah al-Islam (Arabic: فتح الإسلام) is a Sunni Islamist militant group established in November 2006 in a Palestinian refugee camp, located in Lebanon. It has been described as a militant jihadist movement that draws inspiration from al-Qaeda. It became well known in 2007 after engaging in combat against the Lebanese Army in the Nahr al-Bared UNRWA Palestinian refugee camp. Following its defeat at Nahr el-Bared, the group relocated to the Ain al-Hilweh refugee camp near Sidon in 2008. As of 2014, after the death or capture of many members, most of the surviving members of Fatah al-Islam are thought to have joined other groups in Lebanon and Syria including the Free Syrian Army, Al-Nusra Front, Ahrar al-Sham, and the Islamic State of Iraq and the Levant.

The United States Department of State classified the group as a terrorist organization on 9 August 2007 but it was not classified as such anymore on 24 November 2010.

== Origins ==
Fatah al-Islam was led by a fugitive militant named Shaker al-Abssi, a Palestinian refugee who was born in Jericho in 1955. Al-Abssi was once a pilot with the rank of colonel.

Al-Abssi's first militant activities can be traced to connections he established with a secular Palestinian militant group named Fatah al-Intifada in Libya, after it defected from the umbrella Fatah movement in 1983. From Libya, al-Abssi reportedly moved to Damascus, Syria, where he established close ties with Fatah al-Intifada's number two in command, Abu Khaled al-Omla.

Syrian authorities arrested al-Abssi in 2000 and sentenced him to three years in prison on charges of smuggling weapons and ammunition between Jordan and Syria. The government later released him. He went to Iraq following the U.S.-led invasion in 2003 and fought alongside groups affiliated with al-Qaeda. He is said to have become friends with a number of al-Qaeda leaders there.

In 2004, al-Abssi was sentenced to death in absentia by a Jordanian military court for involvement in the assassination of U.S. diplomat Laurence Foley, after Syrian authorities refused to extradite him for trial. Abu Musab al-Zarqawi was also sentenced to death for the killing of Foley and was thought to have been an associate of al-Abssi.

He briefly returned to Syria, where he met again with al-Omla, who helped him relocate to Lebanon. Al-Abssi and a group of youth he met in Iraq set themselves up in the headquarters of Fatah al-Intifada in the village of Helwa in the Western Beqaa District in 2005. In May 2006, al-Abssi and this small group engaged in armed clashes with Lebanese soldiers that led to the killing of one young Syrian wanted by Damascus for fighting in Iraq.

Syrian intelligence services then summoned al-Omla to ask him about al-Abssi and his group. The investigation unmasked the close coordination between al-Omla and al-Abssi that had been kept from the pro-Damascus Secretary General of Fatah al-Intifada, Abu Musa, and by extension, from the Syrian authorities. Al-Omla then reportedly ordered al-Abssi to leave the Western Beqaa, which is close to the borders with Syria, and head for refugee camps in northern Lebanon.

In November 2006, the Palestinian security committee in the Beddawi refugee camp in Tripoli, in northern Lebanon, handed over two members of al-Abssi's group to Lebanese military intelligence. Al-Abssi was reportedly infuriated and decided to break with Fatah al-Intifada and establish his own group, Fatah al-Islam.

In November 2006, Fatah al-Islam set up a headquarters in the Nahr al-Bared Palestinian refugee camp in northern Lebanon. The group seized three compounds in the camp that belonged to Fatah al-Intifada. Al-Abssi then issued a declaration stating he was returning religion to the Palestinian cause.

In March 2007, Seymour Hersh, investigative reporter for the magazine The New Yorker, suggested that the Lebanese government was giving support to Fatah al-Islam, in order to defeat Hezbollah. Hersh stated that David Welch, Assistant to Secretary of State, negotiated with Saudi Arabia and Saad Hariri of the American-backed government of Fouad Siniora to funnel aid to Fatah al-Islam, so that it could eventually attack Shia Hezbollah.

However, Michael Young, a writer for Reason magazine, cast doubts on Seymour Hersh's claims. Additionally, Barry Rubin, Director of the Global Research in International Affairs Center, alleged that al-Abssi was in fact a Syrian operative engaged in destabilizing the government of Lebanon. In November 2008, Hussain Abdul-Hussain, a Washington journalist, questioned Hersh's credibility and links to known Syrian proteges in Lebanon, such as former information minister Michel Samaha.

Other indications that Fatah al-Islam, and al-Abssi specifically, may have had Syrian support come from Samir Geagea, executive body chairman of the Lebanese Forces, who asked why:

if anyone is found out to be a Muslim Brotherhood activist, he receives a death sentence, and if he is very lucky, he gets hard labor. So how come Shaker Al-'Absi—who is no ordinary militant but a leader ... and who committed a crime in Jordan and was sentenced to death there, and was arrested in Syria—has been released [from prison]?

== Membership ==
The official spokesman for Fatah al-Islam is Abu Salim Taha. Fatah al-Islam supposedly has more than 150 armed fighters in the Nahr el-Bared camp. The group allegedly has about more than half a dozen Palestinian members. The bulk of its membership is said to be made up of Syrians, Saudis, and other Arab jihadists who had fought in Iraq, as well as approximately 50 Lebanese extremist Sunnis.

The Syrian ambassador said the leaders of the group were mostly Palestinians, Jordanians, or Saudis, and that perhaps a "couple of them" were Syrians.

The pro-Saudi Al Hayat newspaper reported that Fatah al-Islam has close ties to Syria, and that much of the leadership of Fatah al-Islam is made up of Syrian officers.

== Ideology ==
According to Reuters, Fatah al-Islam's primary goals are to institute Islamic law in Palestinian refugee camps and to target Israel.

Several news organizations have suggested that Fatah al-Islam has connections to al-Qaeda. Some reports even claim Fatah al-Islam is part of the al-Qaeda network. Al-Abssi has stated that the group has no organizational ties to al-Qaeda, "but agrees with its aim of fighting infidels." Fatah al-Islam statements have appeared on Islamist Web sites known to publish al-Qaeda statements.

Bashar Jaafari, Syria's Permanent Representative to the United Nations, responding to Lebanese claims that Syria is a sponsor of Fatah al-Islam, told Reuters that several of the organization's members had been jailed for three or four years in Syria for connections to al-Qaeda, and that upon their release they had left the country. Jaafari also said that, "if they come to Syria, they will be jailed," and that, "they are not fighting on behalf of the Palestinian cause ... [but] on behalf of al Qaeda."

On 23 May 2007, the Arab League issued a statement "strongly condemn[ing] the criminal and terrorist acts carried out by the terrorist group known as Fatah al-Islam," adding that the group has "no relation to the Palestinian question or Islam."

In an interview on CNN International's "Your World Today," Seymour Hersh said that according to an agreement between the United States Vice President Dick Cheney, Deputy National Security Advisor Elliott Abrams, and Saudi National Security Adviser Prince Bandar bin Sultan, covert funding for the Sunni Fatah al-Islam would be provided by the Saudi regime to counterweight the influence of the Shia Hezbollah. Hersh said, "This was a covert operation that [Prince] Bandar ran with us." He also said that when he was in Beirut, he "talked to officials who acknowledged the reason they were tolerating the radical jihadist groups was because they were seen as a protection against Hezbollah."

Hezbollah released a statement saying, "We feel that there is someone out there who wants to drag the [Lebanese] army to this confrontation and bloody struggle ... to serve well-known projects and aims," and it called for a political solution to the crisis.

== Activities ==
=== German train bombing plot ===
The fourth-highest-ranking member of Fatah al-Islam, Saddam el-Hajdib, and his brother Khaled Khair-Eddin el-Hajdib, were among the suspects behind failed bombings on German commuter trains on 31 July 2006. The bombs did not explode due to faulty mechanisms. Saddam el-Hajdib was killed by the Lebanese army in the 2007 conflict between Fatah al-Islam and the Lebanese Army.

=== Plot to assassinate anti-Syrian Lebanese officials ===
On 7 December 2006, Le Monde reported that a top UN official had been informed by the Palestine Liberation Organization (PLO) representative in Lebanon, Abbas Zaki, of a plot by Fatah al-Islam to assassinate 36 anti-Syrian figures in Lebanon. PLO security agents later confronted the group, arresting six of them. Four were later released while a Syrian and a Saudi Arabian were handed over to the Lebanese military.

=== Conflict with the Lebanese army ===
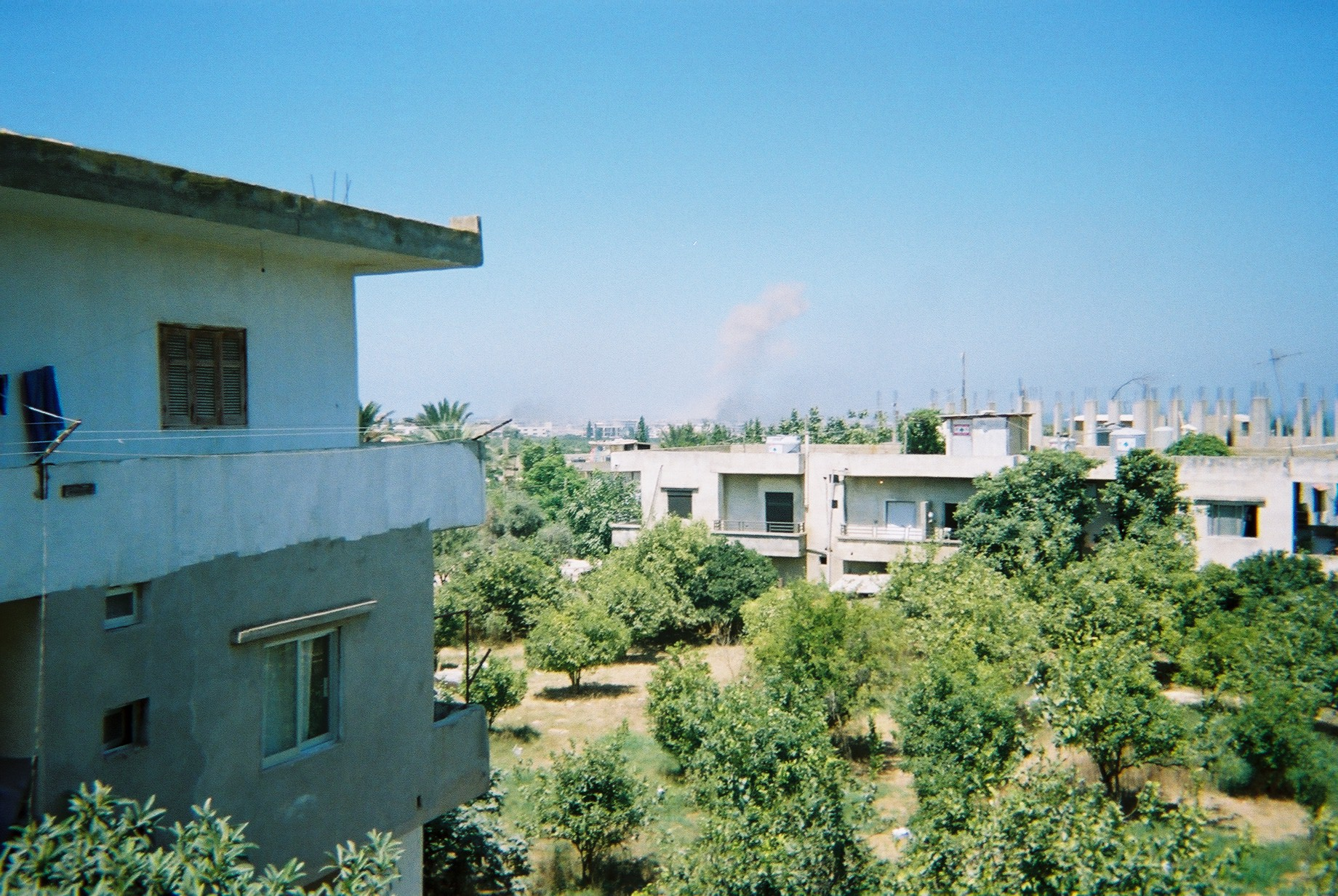
A bomb exploding in Nahr al-Bared refugee camp during the 2007 conflict with the Al-Qaeda inspired militant group, Fatah al-Islam

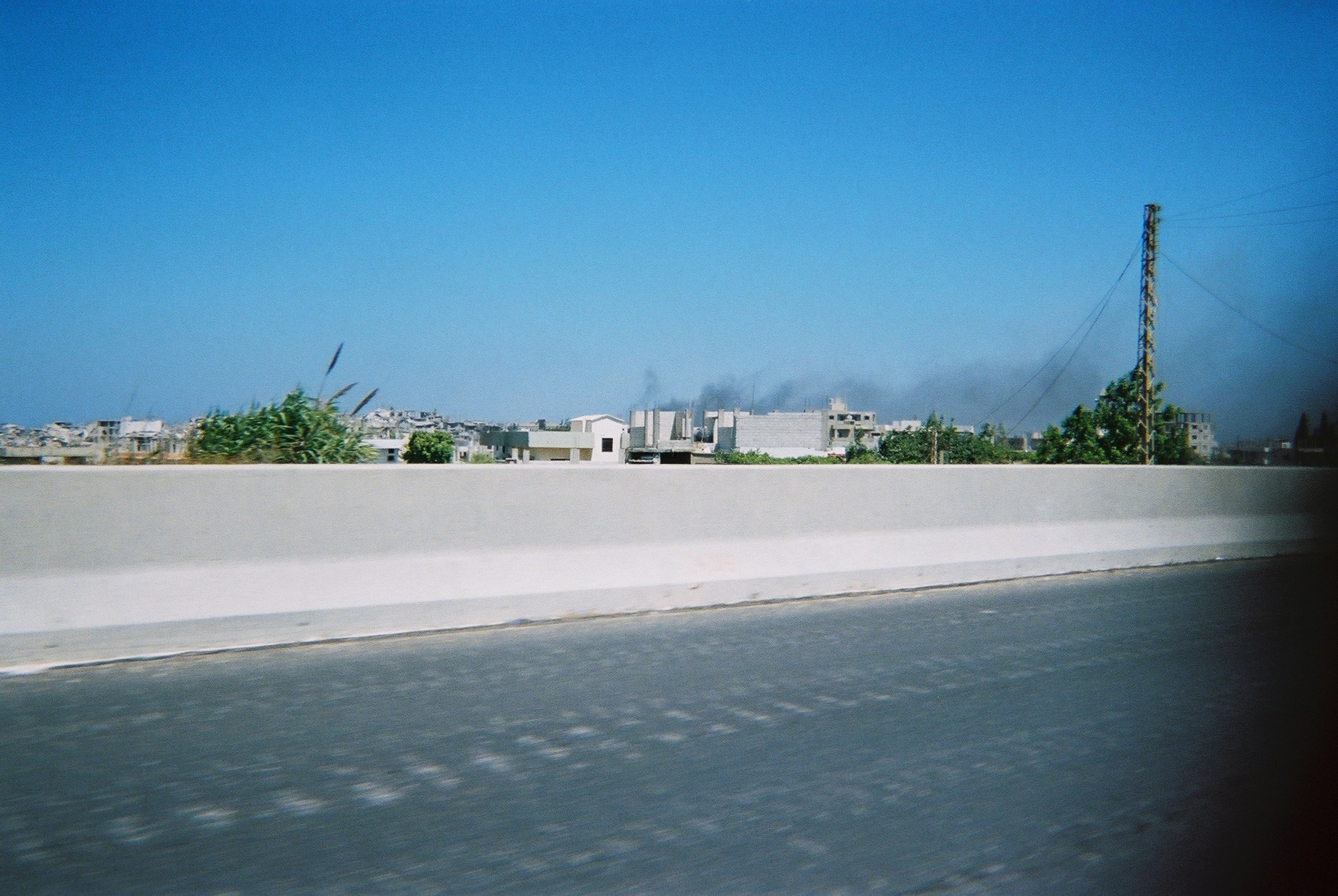
Black smoke rising after an explosion off the road outside Nahr al-Bared

On 19 May 2007, a police search was mounted for suspects in a bank robbery a day earlier in Amyoun, a town southeast of Tripoli. Gunmen made off with $125,000 in cash in the robbery.

According to Ashraf Rifi, the Lebanese Internal Security Forces chief, the bank robbers were traced to an apartment in Tripoli which turned out to be an office for Fatah al-Islam. The armed militants at the office resisted arrest and a gunbattle ensued. A three-day standoff between security forces and militants at the apartment ended on 23 May, after the last Fatah al-Islam militant at that location blew himself up.

Robert Fisk reported that while some of the group that had robbed the bank were cornered in the apartment block, others had holed up in the Nahr el-Bared camp north of the city. Under a 1969 Arab accord, the Lebanese army may not enter the Palestinian refugee camps.

The militants seized Lebanese army positions at the entrance to the Nahr al-Bared camp, capturing two armored personnel carriers. Security officials also reported that the gunmen had opened fire on roads leading out of the camp to Tripoli, and ambushed a military unit, killing two soldiers.

The attacks by Fatah al-Islam killed at least 27 Lebanese soldiers, 15 Fatah al-Islam militants and 15 civilians, injuring another 27 Lebanese soldiers and over 40 civilians. Lebanese forces fired artillery barrages against militants in the camp.

In response, the Lebanese army brought in reinforcements and on 20 May began a steady barrage of artillery and heavy machine gun fire in an attempt to hit militant positions that Fatah al-Islam had occupied inside the Nahr al-Bared camp.

On 20 May, a spokesperson for Fatah made an official statement to the WAFA Palestine News Agency affirming that the "so called Fatah al-Islam" is neither part of, nor linked to, the Fatah organization or the PLO. He further mentioned that this group had launched several attacks against Palestinian refugees in Lebanon and called upon Palestinian refugees to "isolate this emerging group".

The PLO representative in Lebanon, Abbas Zaki also met with official bodies in Lebanon to officially inform them that the group is made up of "extremists" and is not linked with Palestinian agenda.

On 21 May, Zaki and other PLO officials attempted to negotiate a ceasefire to alleviate the humanitarian suffering in the camp. While the Lebanese army had been sending tank and mortar fire into the camp in pursuit of Fatah al-Islam, some 30,000 civilians were trapped inside, and conditions had rapidly worsened. A handful of the wounded were taken out but it was impossible to get outside help to many others. At least 8 refugees were killed and 60 others wounded.

Palestinian civilians from the refugee camp were finally able to flee the fighting after Fatah al-Islam declared a unilateral truce on 22 May, and the exodus continued on 23 May. Fatah al-Islam remained inside the camp and vowed to fight to the death if attacked.

An al-Qaeda military official warned the Lebanese government to stop attacks on the Fatah al-Islam cell, or else "we will tear out your hearts with traps and surround your places with explosive canisters, and target all your businesses, beginning with tourism and ending with other rotten industries... We warn you for the last time, and after it there will only be rivers of blood."

On 16 June 2007, 68 Lebanese soldiers, 50 Fatah al-Islam supporters and 32 civilian Palestinians had been killed in the fighting according to The Daily Star.

On 2 September 2007, the Lebanese Army took control of the Nahr el-Bared camp, after three months of fighting. Thirty-nine Fatah al-Islam members were killed while attempting a mass pre-dawn break-out from the camp. At least three Lebanese soldiers also died in the day's fighting, raising the number of troops killed in three months to 158. At least 222 militants and a number of civilians were also killed in the same period. One day after the Lebanese Army's victory, unidentified fighters clashed with security forces, wounding two.

On 10 September 2007, it was announced that DNA tests on a body thought to be al-Abssi's turned out negative. Lebanese officials said that he probably fled the fighting in the camp before the army took control.

On 12 December 2007, Lebanese Army Major General Francois el-Hajj and his bodyguard were killed in a car bombing attack in Baabda. Several suspects were apprehended and investigated, and the investigation suggests Fatah al-Islam involvement.

On 9 January 2008, al-Abssi made a public speech in Lebanon, acknowledging his escape and vowing revenge against the Lebanese Army.

=== Emirate plot ===
According to Lebanese and Palestinian sources, Fatah al-Islam planned to revolt and establish an emirate in the area of Tripoli with the help of al-Qaeda in Iraq members who had fled Iraq. This operation was dubbed "Operation 755". According to Lebanese sources, the plot was uncovered and foiled. Lebanese security forces had found CDs with detailed plans for this plot. Abu-Salim Taha, spokesperson for the Fatah al-Islam, denied these charges.

=== Criminal charges ===
On 21 June 2007, Lebanese State Prosecutor Saeed Mirza filed criminal charges against 16 Fatah al-Islam members accused of carrying out bombings against two civilian buses that killed two people and injured 21 others near Ain Alaq, a Lebanese mountain village.

Nine of the sixteen suspects accused were in custody when the charges were filed; others, including al-Abssi and the group's reputed military commander, Shehab Abu Qadour (also known as Abu Hureira), were still being sought. The defendants include ten Syrians, two Lebanese, three Palestinians (including one woman) and one Saudi national.

=== Damascus bombing ===
Syria alleged that Fatah al-Islam was behind the 27 September 2008 car bombing in Damascus, which left 17 dead. Syrian TV aired confessions of 10 people, including al-Abssi's daughter, who said they carried out the attack.

=== Death of Abd-al-Rahman Awad ===
Abd-al-Rahman Awad and an associate were intercepted on a main road in eastern Lebanon and died in an exchange of fire with security forces. Abd-al-Rahman Awad was already high on the Lebanese wanted list. He had been condemned to death in absentia on charges relating to a number of bomb attacks and killings over the past three years. According to Lebanese security officials, he had recently been hiding in the Ain al-Hilweh Palestinian refugee camp near Sidon in southern Lebanon. He was traveling with two companions on the main road to Syria when he was ambushed by security forces in the town of Chtaura in east Lebanon. Awad and one of his associates, Abu Bakr Abdullah, were killed in a hail of gunfire. The third man escaped. On 18 August 2010, the group stated its leader and a top commander were heading to Iraq to join insurgents there when Lebanese security troops killed them over the weekend, according to a U.S. terror-monitoring firm. The Washington-based SITE Intelligence Group, which tracks militant postings on the Internet, said that a statement on jihadist forums from Fatah al-Islam confirmed the deaths of the two. The statement also said that they were going to Iraq to join the Islamic State of Iraq.

On 19 August 2010, hundreds of mourners in Ain al-Hilweh laid to rest Awad. The open-casket funeral of Awad, dubbed the "prince" of Fatah al-Islam and formerly one of Lebanon's most wanted Islamists, was attended by his family, representatives of Islamist factions and members of the Fatah movement of Palestinian president Mahmud Abbas. Awad, who had been hiding in Ain al-Hilweh for more than a year, opened fire at troops along with his comrade, Abu Bakr Abdullah, and the soldiers responded, killing the pair, the army said. Abu Bakr was rumoured to have provided military training to members of Fatah al-Islam.

=== Syrian Civil War ===
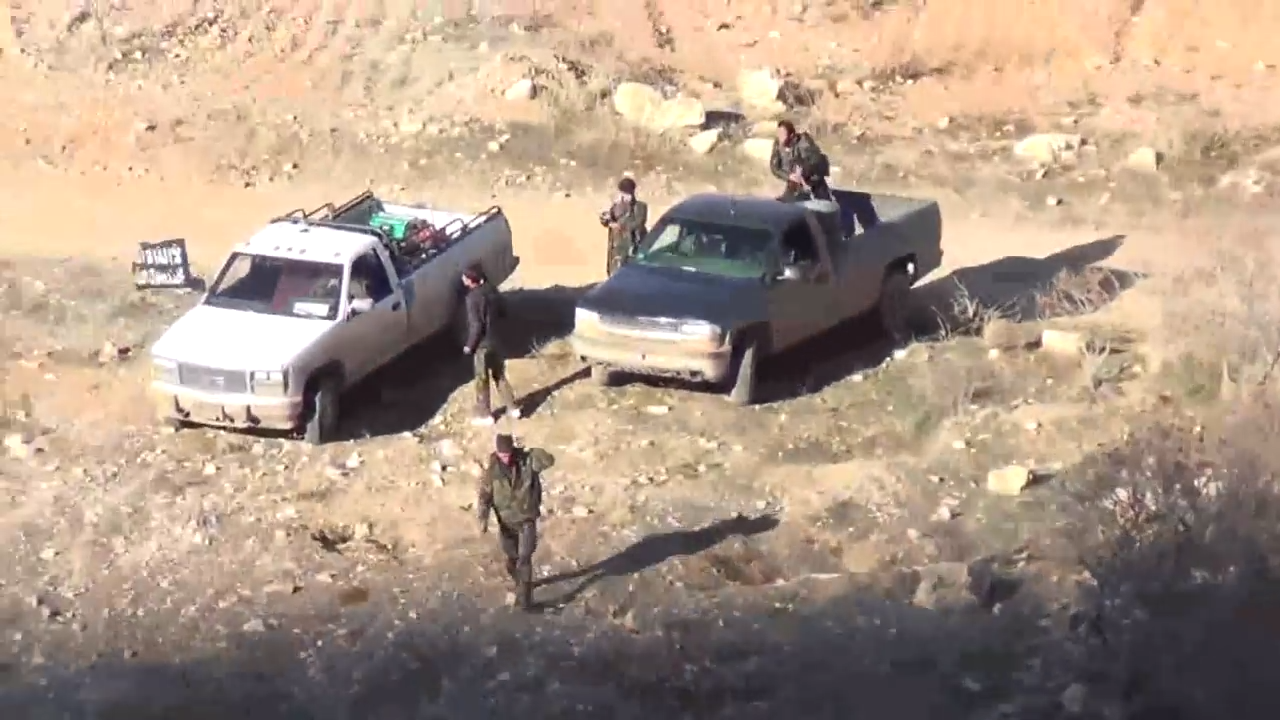
Fatah al-Islam fighters in the Qalamoun Mountains in February 2013

The new leadership of Fatah al-Islam has given enthusiastic support to the Syrian uprising. Beginning in 2012, Fatah al-Islam claimed a small number of attacks in Syria, but its leadership has been decimated in recent months. In April 2012, one of the leaders of the group, Abdel Ghani Jawhar, was killed in the city of Al-Qusair, Syria, after accidentally blowing himself up while making a bomb. The chief of its military wing (the Caliphate Brigades), Nidal al-Asha, was killed in Aleppo in July 2012, and the group's emir, Abdelaziz al-Kourakli (Abu Hussam al-Shami), died in an ambush on the Deraa–Damascus road in September 2012. In October 2012, another founding member and former chief organizer in northern Lebanon, Abu Qaswara al-Qurashi, was killed in a gun battle in Homs.
