= Abu Abdul Rahman =

Iraqi insurgent (died 2006)

Abu Abdul Rahman Mansour (Arabic: أبو عبدالرحمن العراقي) was an Iraqi Canadian alleged to have led insurgent forces in "the most disciplined, intense attacks from insurgency forces" in the November 2006 Battle of Turki.

Abdul-Rahman moved to Turki in 1995, after marrying a woman from the city. He began calling himself al-Iraqi and a "deputy emir" of the insurgency when he posted online stating that the Iraqi mujahideen were entering the "threshold of a new stage in this war." On May 11, 2005 he stated;

The Crusader propaganda apparatus continues to lie and deny. They deny the shooting down of their helicopters, well, our videos are on the way, and when the videos are shown to the entire world, the American military commanders ought to be compelled to explain their lies.

Some sources have suggested he led a "Martyrs Brigade" in Iraq, at the request of Abu Musab al-Zarqawi.
