= Khalil Makkawi =

Lebanese diplomat (born 1930)

Khalil Makkawi (born 15 January 1930, in Beirut) is a Lebanese diplomat. He served as ambassador to the United Kingdom from 1978 to 1983 and as Permanent Representative to the United Nations from 1990 to 1994. He was vice president of the United Nations General Assembly from 1991 to 1992 and president of the UNICEF executive board at the international level in 1995.
