= Nahr al-Bared refugee camp =

Palestinian refugee camp in northern Lebanon

Coordinates: 34°30′47″N 35°57′40″E

An-Nahr al-Bared النهر البارد
- Refugee camp
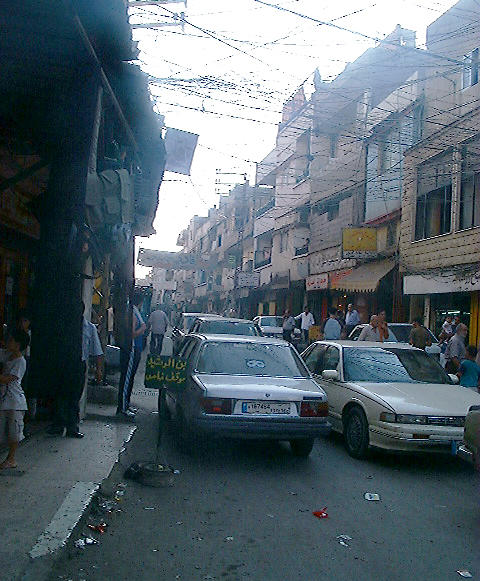
- Nahr al-Bared, summer 2005
- Interactive map of An-Nahr al-Bared
- Country: Lebanon

Population
  - Total: approx. 30,000

Nahr al-Bared (Arabic: نهر البارد, lit. 'cold river') is a Palestinian refugee camp in northern Lebanon, 16 km from the city of Tripoli. Some 30,000 displaced Palestinians and their descendants live in and around the camp, which was named after the river that runs south of the camp. Under the terms of the 1969 Cairo Agreement, the Lebanese Army does not conventionally enter the Palestinian camps, and internal security is provided by Palestinian factions.

== Overview ==
Nahr al-Bared is located directly on the Mediterranean Sea. It is made up of the "official" or "old" camp and the "unofficial" or "new" camp. The "old" camp is roughly 0.2 km^{2} and is under the responsibility of UNRWA. The "new" camp extends mainly to the north of the old camp, but also to lesser degrees to the east and south. It is less densely populated and many wealthier families have built their homes there in recent years.

The camp is oblong shaped with the main road running straight through it (South to North), and the Souq running east to west. The different sectors of the camp are named after areas of what is now the northern Galilee region : Safourieh, Sasa, Safad, etc. Other sectors are more commonly known by the origins of the families living there: e.g. the "Maghrebi" area where families originally from Maghreb.

== History ==
=== Ancient history ===
North to the river Nahr al-Bared was located the ancient Phoenician city Orthosia.

=== Establishment as refugee camp ===
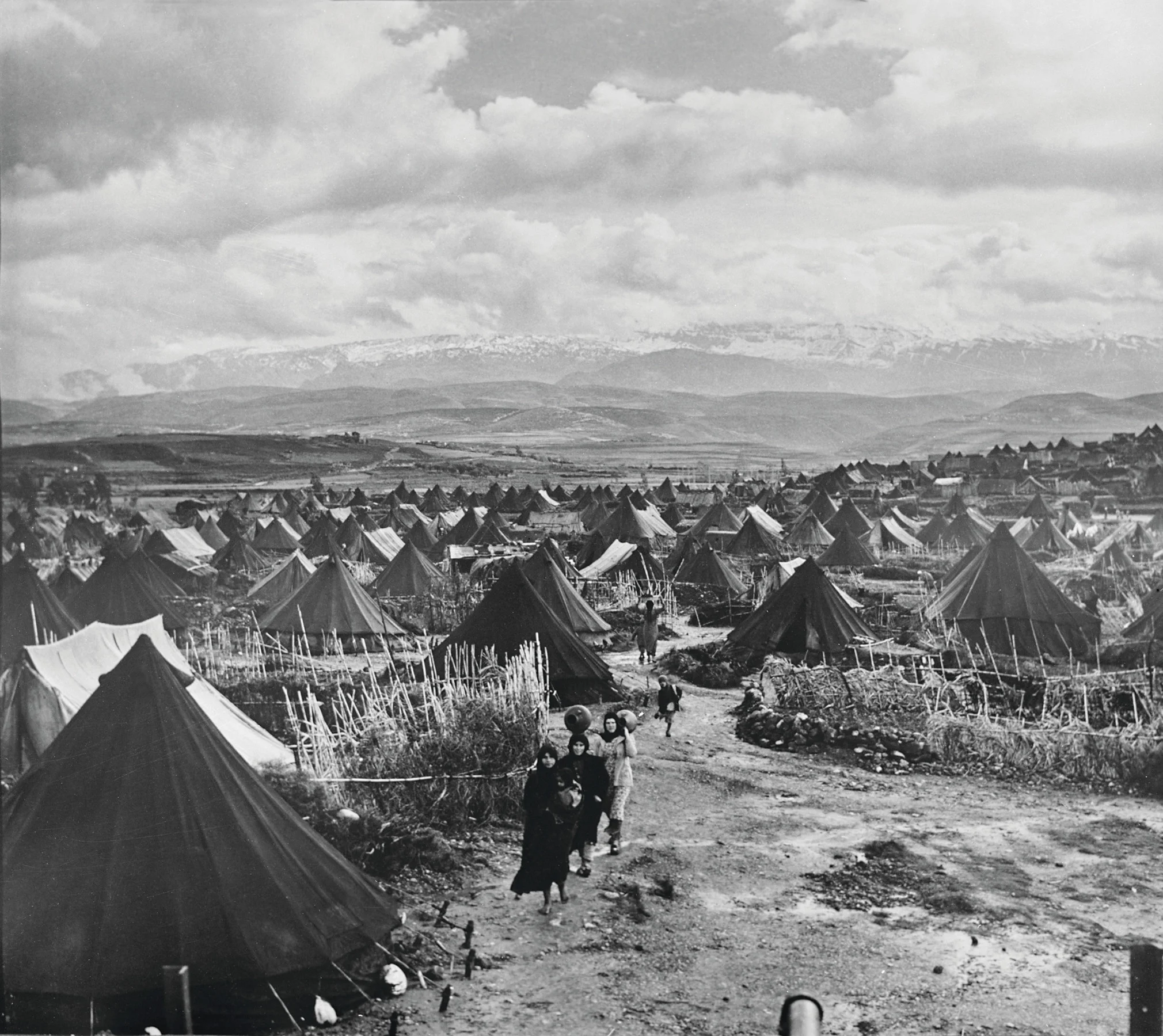
Nahr al-Bared refugee camp in 1952

The camp was established in December 1949 by the League of Red Cross Societies in order to accommodate the Palestinian refugees displaced by the 1948 Palestinian expulsion and flight which occurred during the 1948 Palestine war. The camp was established outside any major Lebanese towns or settlements, which left Nahr al-Bared more isolated from the Lebanese society than many of the other camps in Lebanon. Despite this, due to its position on the main road to Syria and its proximity to the Syrian border, Nahr al-Bared grew to be a central commercial hub for the local Lebanese of the Akkar region.

=== First fifty years ===
On 6 May 1979 an Israeli Air Force air strike killed four people and wounded twenty-five. An Israeli statement claimed the target was a PFLP stronghold. Radio Lebanon reported that the building hit was a farmer's house.

=== 2007 conflict ===
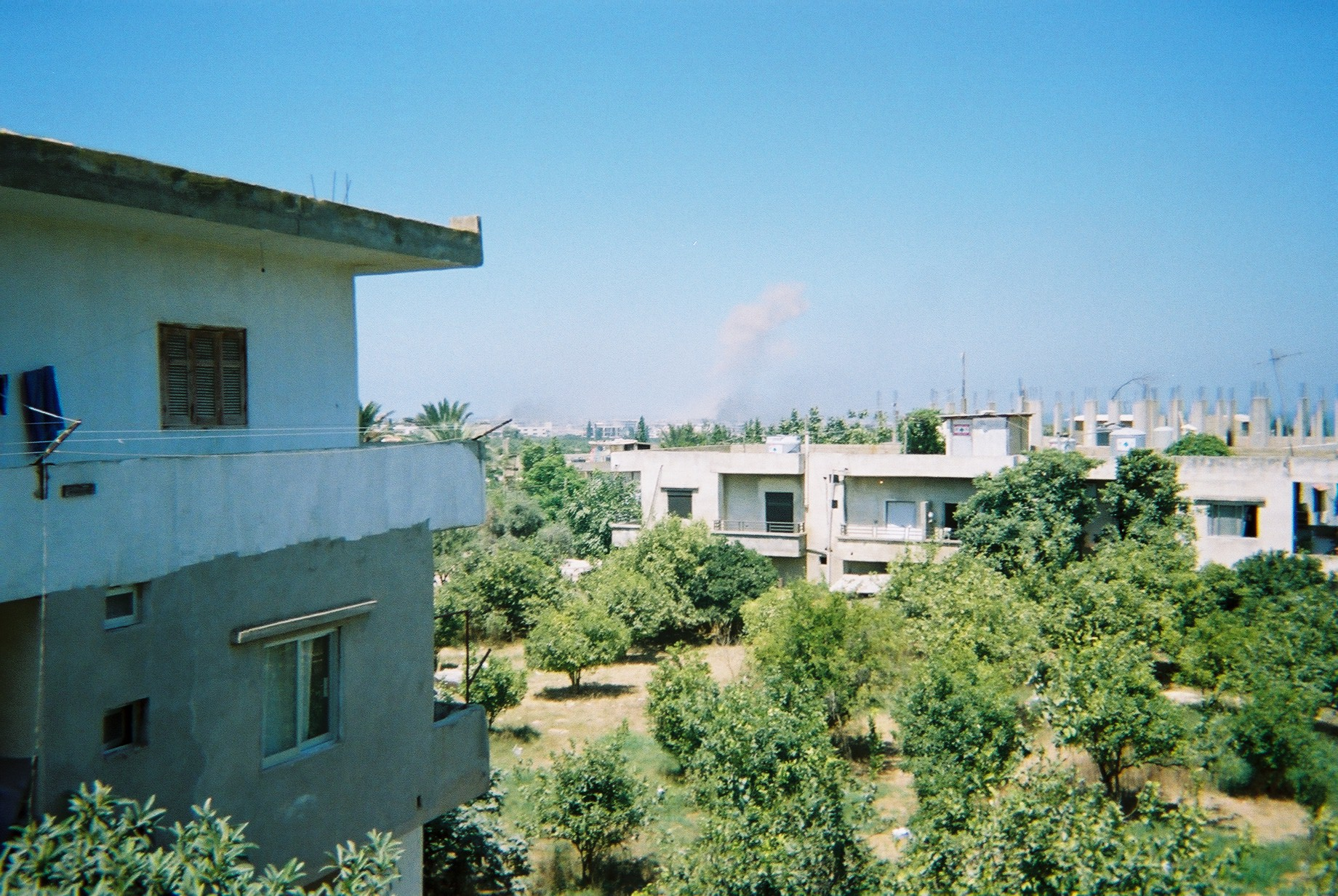
A bomb exploding in Nahr al-Bared refugee camp during the 2007 conflict with the Al-Qaida inspired militant group, Fatah al-Islam

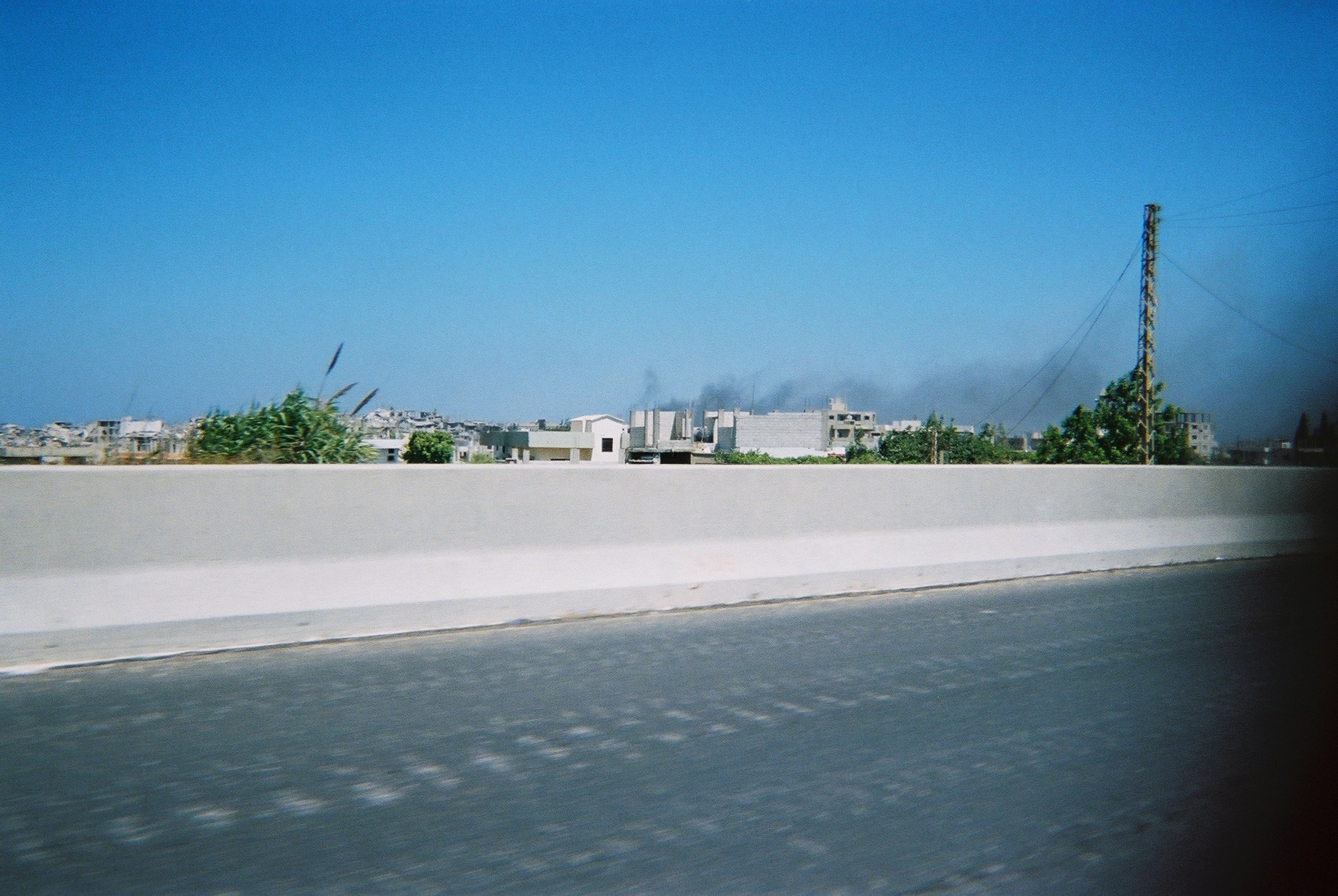
Black smoke rising after an explosion off the road outside Nahr al-Bared

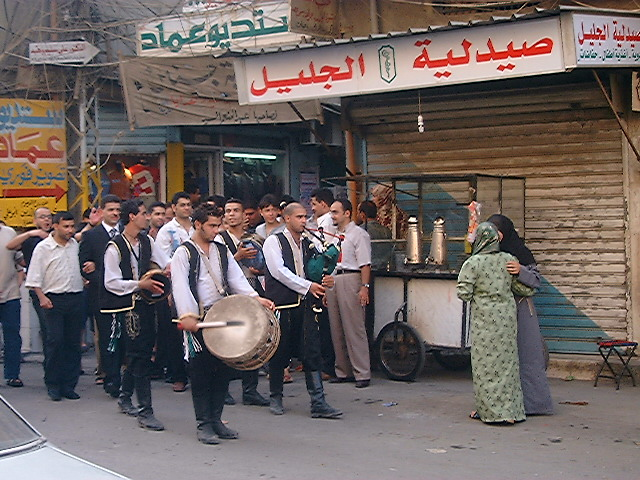
Palestinians celebrating at more quiet times in Nahr al-Bared, 2005.

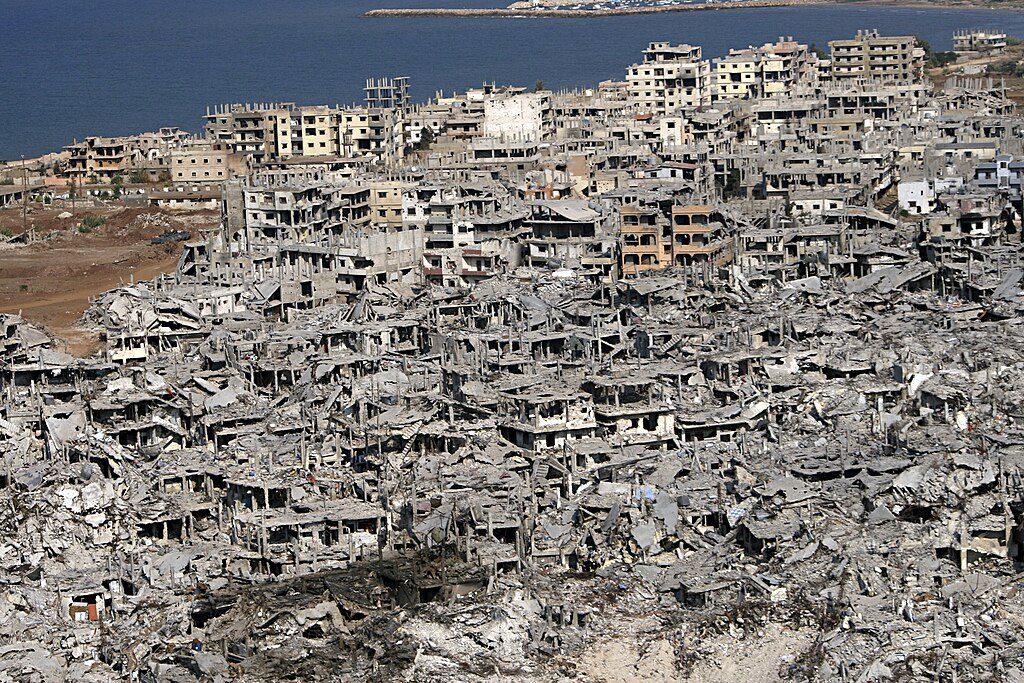
Much of the camp was destroyed in 2007.

Late in the night of Saturday May 19, 2007, a building was surrounded by Lebanese Internal Security Forces (ISF) in which a group of Fatah al-Islam militants accused of taking part in a bank robbery earlier that day were hiding. The ISF attacked the building early on Sunday May 20, 2007, unleashing a day-long battle between the ISF and Fatah al-Islam militants on 200 Street, Tripoli. As a response, members of Fatah al-Islam in Nahr al-Bared Camp (16 km from Tripoli) attacked an army checkpoint, killing several soldiers in their sleep. The army immediately responded by shelling the camp.

The camp became the centre of the fighting between the Lebanese Army and Fatah al-Islam. It sustained heavy shelling while under siege. Most of the inhabitants fled to the nearby Beddawi Palestinian refugee camp (doubling that camps population) or further south to Tripoli, Beirut and Saida. The last civilians (25 women and 38 children, the families of Fatah al-Islam members) were evacuated from the camp on Friday August 24, 2007.

The conflict between the Lebanese Army and Fatah al-Islam ended on Sunday September 2, 2007 with the Lebanese Army taking full control of the camp after eliminating the remaining terrorist pockets.

The United Nations Relief and Works Agency, or UNRWA, charged with the care of the Palestinians, struggled to contain the unprecedented humanitarian crisis. In the meantime, most of the displaced refugees waited in improvised shelters in Beddawi camp and elsewhere for a sustainable solution to arrive.

Nahr al-Bared was also home to the largest market in northern Lebanon; many Lebanese relied on the tax-free goods and black market prices to keep the cost of living down in a country with current inflation at 5.6%. The demise of Nahr al-Bared was a devastating blow to the local economy. The failure of the international community, and Arab states in particular, to fund an emergency humanitarian appeal for Nahr al-Bared means life for refugees living there is set to get harder.

== See also ==
- Palestinian refugee camps
- Cairo Agreement
