= List of assassinations in Lebanon =

This is a list of assassinations in Lebanon and nearby countries.

== Pre-1970s ==
Date	Victim(s)	Location	Method	Assassin(s)	Notes
1152	Raymond II of Tripoli, count of Tripoli	Tripoli			Killed by Hashshashin
April 28, 1192	Conrad of Montferrat	Tyre			Killed by Hashshashin
August 17, 1270	Philip of Montfort, Lord of Tyre				Killed by Hashshashin
1528	Muhammad Agha Shu'ayb, Tripoli ruler	Tripoli			Assassinated along with his son in the Taynal Mosque of Tripoli.
August 6, 1921	Fouad Jumblatt, Druze leader			Shakeeb Wahhab	
October 31, 1950	Sami al-Hinnawi, Syrian head of state	Beirut	Shooting	Hersho al-Barazi	Killed by a cousin of former Prime Minister Muhsin al-Barazi, who al-Hinnawi had executed following a coup.
July 17, 1951	Riad Al Solh, first Prime minister of Lebanon	Amman	Shooting	SSNP	In revenge for the execution of Antoun Saadeh
May 8, 1958	Nasib Al Matn, Nasserist journalist	Beirut	Shooting	Pro-Chamoun Lebanese	Al Matni was assassinated in his office in West Beirut in the early hours on 8 May 1958.
September 1958	Fouad Haddad, Journalist at the Kataeb Party's Al Amal newspaper	Beirut	Abduction		Kidnapped in Beirut and killed in September 1958.
October 13, 1958	Waheed el Solh, aide to Prime Minister Sami Solh	Beirut	Sniperfire		Assassinated during the 1958 Lebanon Crisis
July 27, 1959	Naim Moghabghab, Member of Parliament for the National Liberal Party		Shooting	Progressive Socialist Party	Killed when opponents attacked him in his car
May 16, 1966	Kamel Mrowa, the publisher of Al-Hayat and The Daily Star newspapers	Beirut	Shooting	Adnan Chaker Sultani (INM)	Shot at his office in Beirut.

== 1970s ==
Date	Victim(s)	Location	Method	Assassin(s)	Notes
March 4, 1972	Muhammad Umran, former Minister of Defense of Syria	Tripoli	Shooting		Shot outside his home in Tripoli
July 8, 1972	Ghassan Kanafani, Palestinian writer & spokesperson for the Popular Front for the Liberation of Palestine	Beirut	Bomb	Mossad	Killed by a 3-kg bomb attached to his car in Beirut along with his 17-year old niece.
April 10, 1973	Kamal Adwan, senior Fatah officer	Beirut	Raid	Israel Defence Force	See IDF seaborne attack
April 10, 1973	Muhammad Youssef al-Najjar, Palestine Liberation Organization executive	Beirut	Raid	Israel Defence Force	Wife and elderly neighbor also killed in response to the Munich massacre
April 10, 1973	Kamal Nasser, Palestinian poet & spokesman for the Palestine Liberation Organization	Beirut	Raid	Israel Defence Force	See 1973 Israeli raid on Lebanon
March 6, 1975	Maarouf Saad, Member of Parliament for Sidon	Sidon	Shooting	Lebanese Army (Alleged)	Shot during a fisherman's protest and later died in a Beirut hospital
July 15, 1975	Amine Abouchahine, senior member of the Progressive Socialist Party	Bmariam	Shooting	Kataeb Regulatory Forces	Shot during a family event at his home and later died on way to a Beirut hospital.
May 25, 1976	Linda Jumblatt, sister of Kamal Jumblatt	Beirut	Shooting	Unknown, Syrian interference suspected.	Shot by gunmen in her East Beirut apartment on the same day her brother was meant to meet with president-elect Elias Sarkis. Two of her daughters were also injured.
June 16, 1976	Francis E. Meloy, Jr., United States Ambassador to Lebanon, and Robert O. Waring, US Economic Counselor to Lebanon	Beirut	Abduction	PFLP	Abducted by members of the Popular Front for the Liberation of Palestine; the bodies were found with multiple bullet wounds on a garbage dump near the beach in Ramlet al-Baida.
March 16, 1977	Kamal Jumblatt, Druze leader	Baakleen	Shooting	Ibrahim Huwayji, Syrian Intelligence Officer	Kamal Jumblatt was gunned down in his car near the village of Baakline in the Chouf mountains by unidentified gunmen. His bodyguard and driver also died in the attack.
June 7, 1978	Joud el Bayeh, Kataeb Party leader in Zgharta and Marada Movement affiliate	Zgharta		Marada Movement	His assassination is believed to have triggered the Ehden massacre.
June 13, 1978	Tony Frangieh, Christian leader	Ehden	Mass killing	Phalangists	Killed by Phalangists led by Elie Hobeika during the Ehden massacre
January 22, 1979	Ali Hassan Salameh, Fatah security chief and CIA asset	Beirut	Car bomb	Mossad	Killed in a car bomb along with eight other people in Beirut

== 1980s ==
Date	Victim(s)	Location	Method	Assassin(s)	Notes
March 4, 1980	Salim Lawzi, journalist	Aramoun	Shooting	Syrian intelligence agents	He was kidnapped by gunmen on the Airport Road on 25 February 1980. His heavily bruised tortured body was found eight days later on 4 March 1980 in Aramoun, on the outskirts of Beirut.
May 2, 1980	Hassan al-Shirazi, Iraqi-Iranian Shia scholar	Borj el Brajneh	Shooting	Ba'ath officers	Thirteen bullets hit al-Shirazi, mostly in his head, killing him.
July 23, 1980	Riad Taha, journalist and president of the Lebanese Publishers Association.	Beirut	Shooting	Unknown	Although there have been rumors that Syrian intelligence killed him, there is also another report, stating that Taha was killed due to the feud between his family and another Shiite family.
July 28, 1980	Musa Shuaib, poet and member of Ba'ath Party	Beirut	Car bomb	Unknown	Killed by a car bomb at Beirut International Airport along with three others
August 16, 1981	Elias Hannush, NLP commander	Beirut	Shooting	Leftist gunmen	His nine-year-old daughter, his seven-year-old son, and two bodyguards were also gunned down.
September 4, 1981	Louis Delamare, French ambassador	Beirut	Shooting	Red Knights Militia	Was shot at a checkpoint in Beirut.
March 16, 1982	Bachir Kayrouz, former MP	Hazmieh	Shooting	Unknown	Was killed in Hazmieh
April 1982	Sheikh Ahmad Assaf, Sunni cleric	Beirut	Shooting	Leftist gunmen	Gunned down by three assailants while driving home from a mosque in West Beirut.
September 14, 1982	Bachir Gemayel, President-elect of Lebanon	Beirut	Bombing	Habib Tanious Shartouni and Nabil Alam	Bomb explosion in the Kataeb's Beirut headquarters.
September 29, 1982	Saad Sayel, senior PLO commander	Rayak	Shooting	Abu Nidal Group	He was taken by ambulance to the Mowasat hospital in Damascus, where he died from severe bleeding.
April 18, 1983	Robert Ames, CIA chief	Beirut	Suicide van	Hezbollah	A suicide bombing in Beirut, Lebanon, that killed 32 Lebanese, 17 Americans, and 14 visitors and passers-by. The victims were mostly embassy and CIA staff members.
April 18, 1983	Kenneth Haas, Station Chief	Beirut	Suicide van	Hezbollah	A suicide bombing in Beirut, Lebanon, that killed 32 Lebanese, 17 Americans, and 14 visitors and passers-by. The victims were mostly embassy and CIA staff members.
April 18, 1983	James Lewis, CIA officer	Beirut	Suicide van	Hezbollah	A suicide bombing in Beirut, Lebanon, that killed 32 Lebanese, 17 Americans, and 14 visitors and passers-by. The victims were mostly embassy and CIA staff members.
April 18, 1983	Janet Lee Stevens, American journalist	Beirut	Suicide van	Hezbollah	A suicide bombing in Beirut, Lebanon, that killed 32 Lebanese, 17 Americans, and 14 visitors and passers-by. The victims were mostly embassy and CIA staff members.
April 18, 1983	William R. McIntyre, deputy director of the United States Agency for International Development	Beirut	Suicide van	Hezbollah	A suicide bombing in Beirut, Lebanon, that killed 32 Lebanese, 17 Americans, and 14 visitors and passers-by. The victims were mostly embassy and CIA staff members.
December 1, 1983	Sheik Halim Takieddin, Druze leader	Beirut	Shooting	Unknown	Was found dead at his home in West Beirut.
January 18, 1984	Malcolm H. Kerr, President of the AUB	Beirut	Shooting	Islamic Jihad Organisation	Shot by two gunmen outside his office
February 14, 1984	Ghaith Khoury, Kataeb leader in Jbeil	Okaibe	Shooting	Georges Tannous Chidiac	His wife was also killed due to her injuries
March 1984	Peter Kilburn		Abduction	Islamic Jihad Organization	
February 16, 1984	Ragheb Harb, Shia leader in south Lebanon	Jibchit	Shooting	Danny Abdallah and Hussein Abbas	Shot outside his home by Lebanese criminals, allegedly at the direction of Mossad.
December 28, 1984	Sheikh Khalil al Tawil, Druze leader	Baakleen	Shooting	Unknown	Was killed by four gunmen
June 3, 1985	William Francis Buckley, officer at the U.S. embassy		Execution	Islamic Jihad Organization	Abducted in Beirut on March 16, 1984. Executed in 1985.
February 9, 1986	Khalil Akkawi, leader of the Islamic Unification Movement	Tripoli	Shooting	Syria	Syrian Military Intelligence killed Tawhid leader Khalil Akkawi because he refused to fight the Lebanese Forces. Three supporters of Akkawi's Islamic Tawheed, or Islamic Unification Movement, were slain in gunfights with Syrian troopers after his burial.
February 17, 1987	Husayn Muruwwa, Marxist philosopher	Beirut	Shooting	Pro-Iranian Shia Criminals	Shot in his head by gunmen at his house
May 18, 1987	Mahdi Amel, Marxist intellectual and militant	Beirut	Shooting	Pro-Iranian Shia Criminals	Amel was walking on Algeria street when armed men shot him.
June 1, 1987	Rashid Karami, Prime Minister of Lebanon	Beirut	Helicopter bombing	Syria (alleged)	Killed by bomb aboard helicopter.
August 2, 1987	Mohammad Choucair, advisor to President Amine Gemayel	Beirut	Shooting	Syria	Killed in his West Beirut apartment.
September 24, 1987	André Mass, director of USJ in Saida	Sidon	Shooting	Unknown	Three men stormed into his office and killed him.
February 9, 1989	Anwar al-Fatayri, Progressive Socialist Party official	Deri el Qamar	Shooting	Officer in the Lebanese army	Shot at a public event
May 1, 1989	Sobhi Saleh, head of the Sunni Islamic Higher Council.	Beirut	Shooting	Unknown	Was killed by masked men in motorcycles near a mosque in West Beirut.
May 16, 1989	Hassan Khaled, leader of Sunni community	Beirut	Car bomb	Syria	Khaled and 21 others were killed.
September 21, 1989	Nazem Qadri, Member of Parliament from Beqaa region	Beirut	Shooting	Syria	Driver also killed
November 22, 1989	René Moawad, President of Lebanon	Beirut	Car bomb	Unknown	Killed along with 23 others when a 250-kg car bomb exploded while he was being driven through West Beirut

== 1990s ==
Date	Victim(s)	Location	Method	Assassin(s)	Notes
January 19, 1990	Elias Zayek, Kataeb commander	Byblos	Shooting	Lebanese Forces	Was shot and killed in Jbeil
October 21, 1990	Dany Chamoun, son of former President Camille Chamoun	Beirut	Shooting	Syria	Killed along with his wife and 2 sons. Lebanese Forces leader Samir Geagea was convicted but later cleared of the murder.
December 1991	Mustafa Jeha, writer and Al-Amal contributor	Beirut	Shooting	Disputed	He was a critic of Hezbollah and Iran
February 16, 1992	Abbas al-Musawi, Secretary-General of Hezbollah	Nabatieh	Airstrike	IDF	Killed in an airstrike which also killed his wife, son and four others
August 6, 1993	Henri Philippe Pharaoun, former Foreign Minister	Beirut	Stabbing	Former bodyguard	Was murdered in his bedroom at the Carlton Hotel
January 29, 1994	Naib Ma'ayta, First Secretary of the Jordanian Embassy	Beirut	Shooting	Fatah	Shot in head and chest by lone gunman outside his Beirut apartment
April 13, 1994	Talib Suhayl al-Tamimi, leading member of the Council for a Free Iraq.	Beirut	Shooting	Iraqi intelligence	Four diplomats from the Iraqi embassy detained. One died in prison, the other three sent back to Iraq in 1996
August 31, 1995	Nizar al-Halabi, leader of the Al-Ahbash Sufi movement	Beirut	Shooting	members of Osbat al-Ansar	Killed instantly when gunmen in a white Mercedes opened fire on his car in West Beirut

== 2000s ==
Date	Victim(s)	Location	Method	Assassin(s)	Notes
January 30, 2000	Aql Hashem, Colonel in the South Lebanon Army	Debel	Bombing	Hezbollah	Killed by a remote-controlled bomb in his farm outside Debel. The planning and execution of the operation was filmed and broadcast by Hizbollah's own TV-station Al-Manar.
January 24, 2002	Elie Hobeika, militia leader	Hazmiyeh	Car bomb	Disputed	Killed by a car bomb near his house in the Beirut suburb of Hazmiyeh. The explosion killed three other people, including his two bodyguards, and wounded six more people.
May 7, 2002	Ramzi Irani, Lebanese Forces student representative at Lebanese University	Beirut	Execution	Cold case	Was walking down Hamra Street on his way to celebrate the birthday of his 5-year-old daughter, Yasmina when he was kidnapped without a trace.
May 17, 2003	Abdullah Shraidi, former leader of Osbat al-Nour	Ain el-Hilweh	Shooting	Fatah	Shraidi died two months later, in July, from wounds sustained during the shooting.
May 20, 2002	Jihad Ahmed Jibril, leader of the military wing of the PFLP-GC	Beirut	Car bomb	Mossad	A 2 kg TNT booby trap had been put under the driver's seat of his car. The blast occurred in a crowded commercial center in Beirut's Mar Elias district.
May 2, 2004	Pierre Boulos, former chairman of LF students' branch	Gemmayzeh	Abduction		Found dead in his car outside the Gemayze Hospital after disappearing.
July 19, 2004	Ghaleb Awwali, Amal official	Beirut	Car bomb		Killed by a car bomb in Beirut
February 14, 2005	Rafik Hariri, billionaire and former Prime Minister of Lebanon	Beirut	Car bomb	Hezbollah members Salim Ayyash and Hassan Habib Merhi - Confirmed by Special Tribunal for Lebanon	Killed, along with more than 20 others by a one tonne truck bomb that exploded as his motorcade passed by in Beirut. See Assassination of Rafic Hariri
February 14, 2005	Bassel Fleihan, Economics Minister in the Hariri government	Beirut	Car bomb	Hezbollah members Salim Ayyash and Hassan Habib Merhi - Confirmed by Special Tribunal for Lebanon	Travelling in Hariri's motorcade, died of wounds sustained in explosion. See Assassination of Rafic Hariri
June 2, 2005	Samir Kassir, columnist at "An Nahar" newspaper and fierce critic of Syria	Beirut	Car bomb	Syria	Kassir was assassinated using a car bomb in Beirut on 2 June 2005, just a few days after the general elections.
June 21, 2005	George Hawi, former chief of the Lebanese Communist Party	Beirut	Car bomb	Disputed	When a bomb planted in his Mercedes car was detonated by remote control, as he travelled through Beirut's Wata Musaitbi neighbourhood.
December 12, 2005	Gibran Tueni, Editor in Chief of "An Nahar" newspaper	Mkalles	Car bomb	Strugglers for the Unity and Freedom of al-Sham	Two of his bodyguards were also killed in the blast.
May 26, 2006	Mahmoud al-Majzoub, Palestinian Islamic Jihad official	Sidon	Car bomb	Mossad	His brother Nidal al-Majzoub also died in the explosion.
November 21, 2006	Pierre Gemayel, Minister of Industry	Jdeideh	Shooting	Strugglers for the Unity and Freedom of al-Sham	The day before Lebanese Independence Day, at least three to four gunmen opened fire at close range on Gemayel with five different types of suppressed automatic weapons
June 13, 2007	Walid Eido, Future Party member of the Lebanese Parliament	Beirut	Car bomb	Syrian intelligence	Several citizens were also killed, two of whom were Nejmeh footballers, Hussein Naeem and Hussein Dokmak.
September 19, 2007	Antoine Ghanim, member of the Lebanese Parliament	Sin el Fil	Car bomb	Syrian intelligence	The car-bomb that killed him along with at least six others, including his two bodyguards, one of whom is Antoine Daou.
December 12, 2007	François al-Hajj, General	Baabda	Car bomb	Fatah al-Islam	Four other people, including his bodyguard, also died in the attack.
January 25, 2008	Wissam Eid, senior intelligence official within the Internal Security Forces of Lebanon	Hazmiyeh	Car bomb	Syrian intelligence	A car bomb attack containing an explosive charge of at least 50 kg of explosives killed him, along with his bodyguard and two civilians
February 12, 2008	Imad Mughniyah, senior Hezbollah member	Kafr Sousa	Car bomb	Mossad	Killed by a car bomb blast at around 23:00 in the Kafr Sousa neighborhood of Damascus, Syria.
September 10, 2008	Saleh al Aridi, leader of the Lebanese Democratic Party	Baissour	Car bomb	Unknown	Killed by a 700gm bomb placed in his car outside his home in Aley District
March 23, 2009	Kamal Naji, deputy representative of the PLO in Lebanon	Mieh Mieh	Bomb	Mossad (alleged)	Naji and three others were killed when a roadside bomb exploded as his convoy was passing the Kifah el Musallah security check point to Mieh Mieh camp near Sidon.

== 2010s ==
Date	Victim(s)	Location	Method	Assassin(s)	Notes
October 19, 2012	Wissam al-Hassan, head of information branch of the Internal Security Forces	Beirut	Car bomb	Syrian intelligence	Seven other people, including his driver, also died and nearly 80 people were wounded in the huge blast.
December 4, 2013	Hassan al-Laqqis, military commander of Hezbollah	Hadath	Shooting	ISIS in Lebanon	A number of gunmen shot him in the head in his car from close range as he arrived at his home
December 27, 2013	Mohamad Chatah, former finance minister, ambassador to the United States, and advisor to Prime Minister Saad Hariri	Beirut	Car bomb	Disputed	Killed by a car bomb in Beirut. Presumed to be because Chatah was mentioned as a potential candidate for prime minister. Saad Hariri hinted that he believed the assassins to be from Hezbollah.
February 20, 2014	Abdulrahman Diab, Arab Democratic Party official	Tripoli	Shooting	Unknown	Gunned down in his car by passing motorcyclists

== 2020s ==
Date	Victim(s)	Location	Method	Assassin(s)	Notes
April 4, 2020	Mohammad Ali Younes, head of Hezbollah's counter espionage unit	Nabatieh	Shooting	Mossad	His car was ambushed and had at least two stab wounds and four bullet wounds
December 2, 2020	Mounir Abou Rjeily, head of the anti-smuggling unit in the Higher Customs Council	Qartaba	Stabbing	Unknown	It was found that the head was injured by a sharp instrument which led to his death.
February 4, 2021	Lokman Slim, publisher, political activist and commentator	Addousiyeh	Shooting	Disputed	Stated that Hezbollah supporters had been threatening him at his home and accusing him of treason before his murder.
July 30, 2023	Abu Ashraf al Armoushi, Fatah militant	Ain el-Hilweh	Shooting	Shabab Al-Muslim	Islamist militants ambushed a Fatah military general in a parking lot, killing him and three bodyguards.
August 6, 2023	Elias Hasrouni, former Lebanese Forces official	Ain Ebel	Abduction	Unit 121 (IDF claim)	Lebanese Forces party member and anti-Hezbollah activist was found murdered in his car at his hometown.
January 2, 2024	Saleh al-Arouri, deputy leader of Hamas	Dahieh	Airstrike	IDF	Killed along with six others by an Israeli drone strike in Dahieh, Beirut.
January 8, 2024	Wissam al-Tawil, commander in Hezbollah's Radwan Force	Majdel Selm	Airstrike	IDF	Highest ranking Hezbollah official killed during the 2023 Israel–Hezbollah conflict at the time of his death.
January 9, 2024	Ali Hussein Barji, Hezbollah aerial forces commander	Khirbet Selm	Airstrike	IDF	He was killed in an Israeli airstrike while attending the funeral of Wissam al-Tawil
April 7, 2024	Pascal Suleiman, Lebanese Forces coordinator	Byblos	Shooting	Syrian gang	His abandoned body was found by Syrian soldiers in the Hawit area of Syria. Motives remain unknown. Labeled as a political assassination by party officials.
April 9, 2024	Mohammad Srour, Hamas financial administration	Beit Meri	Shooting	Mossad (alleged)	According to the US Treasury, Srour funneled millions of dollars from Iran to Hamas.
June 14, 2024	Taleb Abdallah, commander of Hezbollah's Naser unit	Jwaya	Airstrike	IDF	Three other Hezbollah members were killed in the airstrike.
July 30, 2024	Fuad Shuker, senior Hezbollah leader and member of the Jihad Council	Haret Hreik	Airstrike	IDF	Six other deaths including Iranian military advisor, Milad Bidi.
August 9, 2024	Samer al-Hajj, Hamas security agent.	Sidon	Airstrike	IDF	Two civilians, a Palestinian and a Lebanese, were also injured.
September 20, 2024	Ibrahim Aqil, Redwan Force founder	Haret Hreik	Airstrike	IDF	Fourteen other Hezbollah members and 29 civilians killed.
September 20, 2024	Ahmed Wehbe, Redwan Force leader	Haret Hreik	Airstrike	IDF	Fourteen other Hezbollah members and 29 civilians killed.
September 24, 2024	Ibrahim Qobeissy, Hezbollah missiles unit leader	Ghobeiry	Airstrike	IDF	At least six people were killed and 15 others injured
September 26, 2024	Muhammad Hussein Srour, Hezbollah air force leader	Beirut	Airstrike	IDF	Another person killed and 15 injured.
September 27, 2024	Hassan Nasrallah, Secretary-General of Hezbollah	Bourj el-Barajneh	Airstrike	IDF	
September 27, 2024	Abbas Nilforoushan, Brigadier general of the IRGC	Bourj el-Barajneh	Airstrike	IDF	
September 27, 2024	Ali Karaki, Jihad Council member	Bourj el-Barajneh	Airstrike	IDF	
September 28, 2024	Nabil Qaouk, Deputy head of Hezbollah's executive council	Bourj el-Barajneh	Airstrike	IDF	
September 29, 2024	Fatah Sharif, chairman of UNRWA's Teachers' Association & Hamas leader	Tyre	Airstrike	IDF	He was killed along with his wife and two children, in the Al-Bass refugee camp in Tyre district, southern Lebanon.
October 1, 2024	Muhammad Ja'far Qasir, Hezbollah financer	Jnah	Airstrike	IDF	
October 3, 2024	Hashem Safieddine, head of Hezbollah's Executive Council	Dahieh	Airstrike	IDF	Deaths only confirmed on October 23, 2024
October 3, 2024	Hussein Ali Hazimah	Dahieh	Airstrike	IDF	Deaths only confirmed on October 23, 2024
October 5, 2024	Said Atallah, Hamas in Lebanon commander	Beddawi camp, Tripoli	Airstrike	IDF	Attallah was also killed alongside his wife and two daughters
October 5, 2024	Mohammad al-Mahmoud, weapons manufacturer	Beddawi camp, Tripoli	Airstrike	IDF	Attallah was also killed alongside his wife and two daughters
October 8, 2024	Souheil Hussein Husseini, Hezbollah headquarter commander	Beirut	Airstrike	IDF	Husseini participated in weapon transfers between the Hezbollah and Iran.
November 9, 2024	Salim Ayyash, Hezbollah assassin	Al-Qusayr, Syria	Airstrike	IDF	Ayyash participated in the Assassination of Rafic Hariri.
November 17, 2024	Mohammad Afif, Hezbollah spokesperson	Ras el Nabaa, Beirut	Airstrike	IDF	Was killed in the Ba'ath Party headquarters in Beirut.
February 17, 2025	Mohammed Shaheen, Al-Qassam Brigades leader	Sidon, Sidon District	Airstrike	IDF	Killed by an air strike on his vehicle, during the February 2025 ceasefire in the Gaza war.
April 20, 2025	Hussein Ali Nasr, Unit 4400 deputy commander	Kaouthariyat as-Siyad, Sidon District	Airstrike	IDF	Unit 4400 deputy commander was killed by an IDF airstrike on his vehicle injuring two others.
March 3, 2026	Adham Adnan al-Othman, senior commander of the Palestinian Islamic Jihad	Dahieh	Airstrike	IDF	
April 8, 2026	Ali Reda Abbas, commander of the Radwan Force		Airstrike	IDF	Killed during the 8 April 2026 Lebanon attacks

== See also ==
- List of extrajudicial killings and political violence in Lebanon
- Assassinations linked to the Cedar Revolution
- Lebanese Civil War
- Unit 121
