= Choucair =

Choucair is a surname. Notable people with the surname include:

- Bechara Choucair (born 1973), Lebanese-born American healthcare professional
- Mohammad Choucair (born 1917), Lebanese politician
- Saloua Raouda Choucair (1916–2017), Lebanese painter and sculptor

== See also ==
- Choutair
