= Ramzi Irani =

Lebanese student activist

- Born: Ramzi Albert Irani; 21 June 1966; Hazmieh
- Died: 20 May 2002 (aged 36)
- Occupation: Civil engineer
- Spouse: Jocelyne El Khoury
- Children: Yasmine and Jad

Ramzi Albert Irani (Arabic: رمزي عيراني) (21 June 1966 – 20 May 2002), born in Lebanon, was a well-known Lebanese Forces (LF) student representative at Lebanese University in Beirut. He was abducted and later found dead in 2002, following a series of events marking the eighth anniversary of the imprisonment of Lebanese Forces party leader Samir Geagea.

== Early life ==
Irani was born in Hazmieh on 21 June 1966 to a Maronite family. He attended Sisters of Ibrin School, Collège de la Salle in Clémenceau and Collège Mont-la-Salle in Ain Saadeh. He studied engineering at the Lebanese University Faculty of Engineering in Roumieh where he graduated with a bachelor's degree in civil engineering in 1992. He worked in Total Liban in Beirut from 1993 until his death.

== Political background ==
Irani was a well-known outspoken critic of the Syrian-occupied government in Lebanon. He led the Lebanese Forces in Lebanon's Order of Engineers elections to win a seat on the order's board for the first time, defeating Pro-Syrian and Hezbollah candidates. In 2000, Lebanese authorities briefly arrested Irani and he was released a short while later with broken ribs. After being released, Irani organized peaceful protests against the Syrian-occupied government of Lebanon and faced continuous harassment from Lebanese authorities.
On 21 April 2002, he gave his last speech in public, during the celebration of the eighth anniversary of the imprisonment of Lebanese Forces leader Samir Geagea at the Lebanese University Faculty of Law in Jal el Dib.

== Personal life ==
In 1996, he married Jocelyne El Khoury and had two children, Yasmine (born 1997) and Jad (born 1999) .

== Abduction and murder ==
On 7 May 2002, Irani was walking down the popular Hamra Street on his way to celebrate the birthday of his 5-year-old daughter, Yasmina, when he was kidnapped without a trace. His lack of resistance suggested that he knew who his kidnappers were.

Starting 8 May 2002, Ramzi's friends began to receive brief anonymous phone calls during which callers would say that Ramzi's car was seen in Beirut. After alerting the police and visiting the places mentioned by the callers, it appeared that the claims were false.

On 9 May 2002, Amnesty International issued a statement to express the fear that Irani could be detained incommunicado and subjected to torture.

Irani's rotting corpse was found on 21 May in the back of his car. The official cause of death was a bullet piercing to the heart. His body was discovered seven hours after the assassination of Jihad Jibril, son of PFLP-GC leader Ahmed Jibril in Beirut. The two assassinations being clearly unconnected, some think that the kidnappers dumped Irani's corpse in the aftermath of Jibril's assassination for diversion purposes. A newsportal, Al Qanat, revealed they had received a report saying that Irani had been murdered because they feared he would speak out about his abductors and that it would have created a "big political crisis."

Ramzi Irani's murder is still a cold case like many other brutal assassinations which have occurred against opponents of the Syrian occupation of Lebanon during the recent years. Many people in Lebanon point the finger at Syria and Hezbollah.

== Legacy ==
Irani's involvement in the Engineers Section of the Lebanese Forces led to the establishment of the Ramzi Irani Memorial Award, awarded to the three students of the Faculty of Engineering in Roumieh who have received the highest grades in mechanical engineering, civil engineering and electronic and computer engineering departments.
Since 2003, the LF students of the Faculty of Engineering in Roumieh have been holding a commemorative mass for Irani during May of each year. The annual requiem mass is celebrated in the Maronite Cathedral of St. Georges in the center of Beirut.

== See also ==
- Syrian occupation of Lebanon
- Lebanese Forces
- List of assassinated Lebanese politicians
- List of extrajudicial killings and political violence in Lebanon
