= Fatah Sharif =

Palestinian teacher and Hamas militant (died 2024)

- Native name: فتح شريف أبو الأمين
- Born: Gaza Strip, Palestine
- Died: 29 September 2024 Al-Bass refugee camp, Tyre, Lebanon
- Cause of death: Assassination by airstrike
- Allegiance: Hamas

Fatah Sharif Abu Al-Amin (Arabic: فتح شريف أبو الأمين; also spelled Fateh Sherif Abu el-Amin; died 29 September 2024) was a Palestinian who was the principal of the UNRWA-run 'Deir Yassin' school in Lebanon until his suspension in March 2024. He served as member of the Hamas leadership in Lebanon. He was killed in an Israeli Air Force strike as part of September 2024 Israeli attacks against Lebanon, along with his wife and two children, in the Al-Bass refugee camp in Tyre district, southern Lebanon.

== Biography ==
In March 2024, UNRWA in Lebanon announced his suspension from his position as a teacher for the agency due to what was described as a "violation of agency protocols" after he praised the 7 October attack. He was suspended for three months. Following his suspension, dozens of activists protested the decision in front of UNRWA offices in Beirut.

According to the Israel Defense Forces, Sharif was "in charge of coordinating Hamas activities from Lebanon with elements of Hezbollah, and was also responsible for strengthening the organization's efforts in Lebanon in the field of recruiting agents and purchasing weapons". He also led efforts to "build Hamas' power in Lebanon and worked to promote Hamas' interests in the arena, both politically and militarily".. Hamas in a press release confirmed that ‘Fatah Sahriv was the Hamas leader in Lebanon and a member of the movement's leadership abroad’.

=== Death ===
On 29 September 2024, during the Israeli Air Force's September 2024 attacks, he was killed, along with his wife and two children, in the Al-Bass refugee camp in Tyre district, southern Lebanon. Hamas later confirmed his death. Hamas praised him posthumously for his "educational and jihadist work."
