= Mohammad Afif =

Lebanese member of Hezbollah (1959–2024)

- محمد عفيف
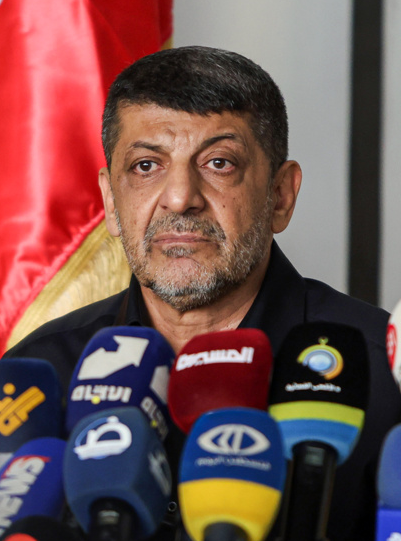
- Afif in 2024
- Born: 1959
- Died: 17 November 2024 (aged 64–65); Beirut
- Cause of death: Israeli Airstrike
- Occupation: Spokesperson
- Years active: 1983–2024
- Political party: Hezbollah
- Spouse: Dalal Ali Diab

Mohammad Afif (Arabic: محمد عفيف; 1959 – 17 November 2024) was a Lebanese spokesperson for Hezbollah and head of its media relations department. He was a founding member of the organization and was a close companion of Abbas al-Musawi.

== Hezbollah activity ==
Muhammad Afif held the position of the first media consultant in the party, and according to the Lebanese media, he served as the media relations officer since 2014, replacing Hassan al-Laqqis. He was also responsible for the management of Hezbollah's media coverage during the 2006 Lebanon War. Afif previously managed news and political programs on Hezbollah's Al-Manar channel as well as on Al Nour Radio and the Al-Ahed.

=== War coverage ===
Afif appeared as the party's spokesperson, and held press conferences live from the heart of the Da'aheh district in Beirut, and in areas affected by IDF activity in Lebanon as part of Operation Northern Arrows.

He stated that Israel had not managed to capture "a single" village in Lebanon during the invasion, he also dismissed the IDF claim of a significant decline of Hezbollah's missile stockpile as "just lies".

After the attack on Majdal Shams that killed 12 children, Afif said that the group was not responsible for the attack on Majdal Shams, instead stating it was caused by an Israeli Iron Dome projectile launched in the course of countering Hezbollah rocket fire aiming for Israeli military sites.

On 22 October 2024, he held a press conference, which he had to interrupt live due to an evacuation notice issued by the IDF for the area where the press conference was held. At that press conference, Afif accepted responsibility on behalf of Hezbollah for attacking Binyamin Netanyahu's house in Caesarea several days earlier.

== Assassination ==
An Israeli strike on a building containing the headquarters of the Lebanese branch of the Ba'ath Party in Ras al-Nabaa neighborhood of Beirut Central District killed Afif. A total of four people were killed, all of which were members of Hezbollah's media department, and 14 others were injured.
