= Hassan Khaled =

Lebanese grand mufti (1921–1989)

Hassan Khaled حسن خالد

Personal details
- Born: 1921 Beirut, Lebanon
- Died: 16 May 1989 (aged 67–68) Beirut, Lebanon

Hassan Khaled (Arabic: حسان خالد; born in 1921 – 16 May 1989) was the leader of Lebanon's Sunni Muslim community. As a grand mufti, he presided over Islamic courts in Lebanon for 23 years, and served as head of the Islamic Coalition, a body which included past and present prime ministers, Sunni parliamentary figures, and Sunni members of Lebanon's government. He was considered a moderate, and upon his assassination was named as the "father of moderation," as he worked throughout his career to bring unity to the warring factions of the Lebanese Civil War. Khaled's assassination in 1989 was widely believed to be the work of Syria.

== Life ==
Hassan Khaled was born in Beirut, French Lebanon, in 1921. He attended his primary school at Al Makkased Islamic schools in Beirut, continued his study of intermediate and secondary education at the Institute of Azhar Lebanon in Beirut, and pursued his university education at Al-Azhar University. at the Faculty of Theology in Cairo, where he obtained the bachelor's degree (BA) in 1946.

He started his public life after graduating from legitimacy School in Beirut as a professor of Logic and Tawhid (Monotheism). In 1954 he was appointed as Deputy Chief Judge of Beirut, then in 1957 he was appointed as a judicial Judge in the province of Akkar in North Lebanon. Khaled then transferred in 1960 to the Mount Lebanon Legitimacy (sharia) Court district.

He also headed the Higher Judicial Legitimacy Council in Lebanon, and presided over the Islamic Gathering, which was a weekly meeting that included the present and past Lebanese prime ministers, present and past Lebanese ministers, Muslim Parliamentary figures. He was also The Chairman of the higher Muslim Legitimacy Council in Lebanon, and the Vice-President of the founding Council of the Muslim World League in Mecca, and Vice-President of the International Islamic charity association in Kuwait, and a member of the Theology Council Association in Muslim world League in Makkah, a member of the Theology Assembly of the Organization of Islamic countries in Jeddah, and a member of Islamic Research Assembly in Egypt.

He was unanimously elected by Islamic scholars, political leaders and opinion leaders in Lebanon as the Grand Mufti of Lebanon on 21 December 1966.

== His writings ==
Khaled wrote on many issues of Islam, including:

- Islam and its social and material interdependence in society.
- Inheritance in the Islamic Sharia (Legitimacy).
- Personal Status provisions of the Islamic Sharia(Legitimacy).
- Tales of Ramadan.
- course of the Islamic call in Lebanon during the 14th century AH.
- marriage to non-Muslims.
- definition Letter of Islam.
- Islam's position on paganism, Christianity and Judaism.
- views and positions.
- Madinah society before and after migration.
- Muslims in Lebanon and the civil war.
- Torah, the Bible and the Koran and science (A translation of Maurice Bokay's famous Book).
- martyr in Islam.
- Islam and its vision to after life.

Khaled had a national role through chairing for many years the “Islamic Gathering,” a weekly political meeting that was held at Dar Alfatwa that gave its views on Lebanese politics during the civil war in Lebanon. He was personally involved as a representative of Lebanon in many Islamic and Arab conferences, or sent representatives to different Arab and world countries.

== Career ==
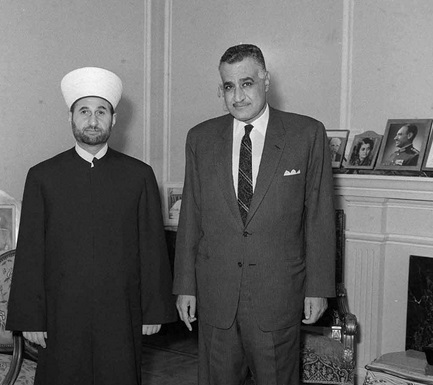
Khaled being received by Egyptian President Gamal Abdel Nasser in Cairo for the Muslim Scholars Conference, October 1968

1. Preaching and teaching in mosques in Beirut.
2. Preaching and teaching in Makkawi and Majidiyah, and the Imam Ali mosques in the heart of Beirut for more than twenty years.
3. He taught the subjects of logic and uniformity in Azhar- Lebanon-Beirut.
4. Assistant prosecution Judge in the Islamic Courts in Beirut.
5. Deputy Chief Judge in Beirut.
6. Judge of Akkar province in northern Lebanon.
7. President of the Courts of legitimacy in the province of Mount Lebanon.
8. Assuming the post of Mufti of the Lebanese Republic on 11/12/1966 after unanimity scholars and Muslim leaders on his election in the lobby of the Dar Al-Fatwa.
9. Chairman of the Supreme Judicial Council legitimate in Lebanon.
10. Chairman of the Islamic Gathering. (weekly meeting of heads of governments, ministers, MPs).
11. President of the Supreme Islamic Council in Lebanon.
12. Deputy Chairman of the Constituent Assembly of the Association of the Islamic world league in Mecca.
13. Deputy head of the Islamic Charity Organization in Kuwait.
14. Academy member jurist in the Muslim World League / Mecca.
15. Academy member in the Organization of Islamic States / Jeddah.
16. A member of the Islamic Research Academy in Egypt.
17. Participated personally as a representative of Lebanon in many Arab and Islamic conferences or sent representatives in each of: Saudi Arabia / Egypt / Sudan / Morocco / Libya / Algeria / Tunisia / Arab Emirates / Qatar / Kuwait / Syria / Iraq / Yemen / Iran / Indonesia / Australia / China / France / Britain / Rome / Afghanistan / Ghana / Niger / Mali / Chad / Somalia / Uganda / Poland / Romania / Bulgaria / Soviet Union /and the United States of America.

== Honors ==
- National Medal of Cedar-Lebanon-16 May 1989.
- Grand Collar of the renaissance of the Jordanian-highest first-class medal in the Hashemite Kingdom of Jordan-1967.
- High medal from the president-the Republic of Chad.
- Decoration from the Soviet Union on the research of the cessation of nuclear armament on 14 August 1974.
- Islam Decoration (Girdanov) – Poland.
- Received several medals from the United States of America.

== Valuations ==
- Honorary doctorate in Cairo, after a lecture he delivered at Al-Azhar in the Hall of Imam Mohammed Abdo, during a dinner invitation from the late President Gamal Abdel Nasser.
- Honorary doctorate from the University Jin Ji, China.

== Family ==
Mufti Hasan Khaled was married to Salwa Balhawan and had nine children. Their names from oldest to youngest: Bahiyya, Saadeddine, Ammar, Mohammad, Hala, Hani, Hisham, Mazen, and Layla.

== Death ==
On 16 May 1989, a 300-pound (136 kg) car bomb was detonated next to Khaled's car as he drove through Beirut. Khaled and 21 others were killed. Syrian intelligence is widely believed to be behind the assassination; Khaled had been a critic of Syrian intervention in Lebanon. As Khaled had been killed while returning from a meeting with anti-Syrian general Michel Aoun, his killing was believed to be a warning to all those who cooperated with Aoun.

== See also ==
- List of assassinated Lebanese people
- Sunni Muslim
