= Assassination of Pierre Amine Gemayel =

2006 murder in Beirut, Lebanon

- Part of The Attacks linked to the Cedar Revolution
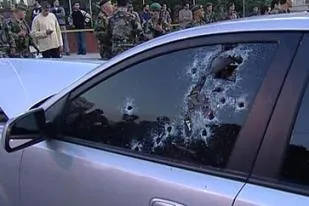
- Gemayel's car after the assassination
- Location: Beirut, Lebanon
- Date: November 21, 2006; 19 years ago 3:20 p.m. (EET)
- Target: Pierre Amine Gemayel
- Attack type: Polticial assassination
- Deaths: Pierre Amine Gemayel; Samir Chartouni
- Perpetrator: Strugglers for the Unity and Freedom of al-Sham
- Motive: Gemayel's opposition to the Syrian occupation of Lebanon

On 21 November 2006, Pierre Amine Gemayel, the Lebanese minister of Industry and member of parliament, was shot fatally by three unknown gunmen allegedly linked to the SSNP. The motive for the attack was Gemayel's opposition to Syria's 29 year occupation of Lebanon. He had been an essential part of the Cedar Revolution, which drove the Syrian Arab Armed Forces out of Lebanon. Gemayel was the fifth prominent anti-Syrian figure to be killed in Lebanon in two years.

== Background ==
Syria had occupied Lebanon since 1976, after being invited by Lebanese President Suleiman Frangieh. After 30 years, and following the assassination of Lebanese Prime minister Rafic Hariri, the Lebanese people, in collaboration with the March 14 Alliance, led the Syrians out of Lebanon in the Cedar Revolution. Following their withdrawal, Syrian forces assassinated 13 high ranking Lebanese figures in 2005 alone, Gemayel being the only one in 2006.

== Event ==
Gemayel was visiting his electoral district of Metn, in Jdeideh that day. Gemayel was assassinated in a more brazen manner than used in the past: gunmen killing in broad daylight, rather than anonymous car bombs detonated remotely. His driver, who escaped the attack unhurt, rushed Gemayel to St Joseph's Hospital, where he was declared dead. His bodyguard, Sameer Chartouni, was also killed in the attack.

== Perpetrators ==
Gemayel's killers issued a communique in which they referred to themselves as the Strugglers for the Unity and Freedom of al-Sham. They said that they killed Gemayel because he was "one of those who unceasingly spouted their venom against Syria and against Hezbollah, shamelessly and without any trepidation". Those allegations could point the fingers at the Syrian Social Nationalist Party that has a long history of political assassinations in Lebanon.

A report by Kuwaiti newspaper Al-Seyassah alleged that an editor from the state-run Syrian Arab News Agency contacted a Lebanese pro-Syrian newspaper 55 minutes prior to the assassination to inquire about the murder. The story claims the SANA reporter called back 10 minutes later to apologize for the original call. Al Seyassah stated it did not name the Lebanese newspaper to protect its identity.

Lebanese law requires the dissolution of the government if one third of the 24-member Cabinet resign or become unavailable. It has been speculated that Gemayel's assassination was an attempt by pro-Syrian groups to reach the required third, and so force the current Government from power. With the recent resignation of six Hezbollah MPs from the Cabinet, added to Gemayel's death, the resignation or death of only two more ministers would topple the government. Others from the close circle of Pierre Gemayel would speculate that his fast political ascension had bothered many local powers mainly Syria's regime allies.

Others have, however, put forward many conspiracy theories regarding the murder such as a possible false flag operation. Many have questioned Syria's interest in targeting the Christian society as that could have the effect of destabilising a rival Christian party, namely Michel Aoun's Free Patriotic Movement which, together with Hassan Nasrallah's Shia Group Hezbollah, forms the largest parliamentary pro-Syrian block. However the pro-Syrian coalition managed to establish a sit-in, later growing into a protest camp, in the martyr's square downtown Beirut, to insist on their demands.

Despite these claims, the unidentified perpetrators are still at large and the investigation on the attack has been inconclusive.

== Reactions ==
=== Domestic ===
Saad Hariri, then majority leader of the Lebanese Parliament and the head of the Future Movement, accused Syria of ordering the killing. The Syrian government denied any involvement, and condemned the killings.

Lebanese Druze leader Walid Jumblatt also blamed Syria for the assassination, and said he expected more such killings aimed at undermining the Lebanese parliament's ruling majority. "I bluntly accuse the Syrian regime", Jumblatt said.

Samir Geagea, the leader of The Lebanese Forces, one of the major nationalist parties, demanded President Émile Lahoud resign, and also accused Syria of ordering the killing. Michel Aoun, leader of The Free Patriotic Movement, strongly condemned the murder, and argued that it was aimed at generating chaos and uncertainty, primarily among the Christian society in Lebanon. Similar remarks and condemnation were issued by almost all of the major Lebanese political players.

=== International ===
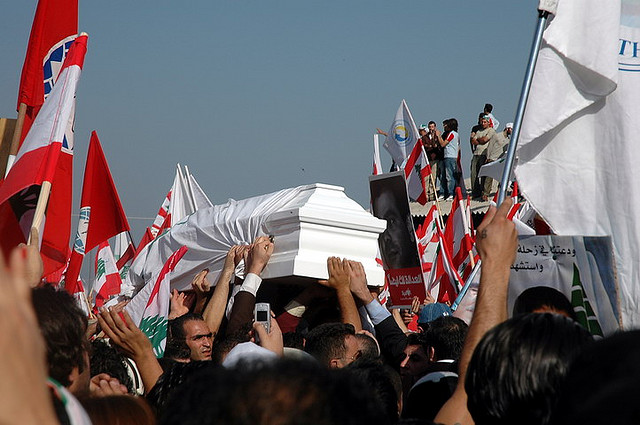
Gemayel's coffin being carried through the crowds

The UN Security Council condemned Gemayel's assassination.

Pope Benedict XVI's representative at the funeral condemned the "unspeakable" assassination.

British Prime Minister Tony Blair condemned the murder. Margaret Beckett, Secretary of State for Foreign and Commonwealth Affairs in the United Kingdom, called the killing "contrary to the interests of all in the region" in a press conference aired on Al Jazeera English approximately an hour after Gemayel's death was confirmed.

The U.S. government condemned the murder. The US ambassador to the UN, John R. Bolton, said "One pattern we discern in these political assassinations of Lebanese leaders – journalists, members of parliament – they are all anti-Syrian. So I suppose one can draw conclusions from that," he said.

== See Also ==
- List of extrajudicial killings and political violence in Lebanon
