= Hassan al-Laqqis =

Lebanese militant leader (d. 2013)

Hassan al-Laqqis حسان اللقيس

Personal details
- Born: 1970
- Died: 4 December 2013 (aged 42–43) Beirut, Lebanon

Military service
- Rank: Military Commander

Hassan Hawlo al-Laqqis (Arabic: حسان اللقيس; 1970 – 4 December 2013) was Hezbollah's chief logistics officer and military commander in Lebanon. Laqqis was assassinated when two gunmen shot him four times in the head and neck inside his car from close range around midnight of 3–4 December 2013.

== Activities ==
Laqqis served most of his life in the group's military service since its first days of inception in the 1980s until his death. He was among the top commanders of Hezbollah in the 2006 second Lebanon war against Israel. At the time of his killing, he served in several battles inside Syria. He was alleged to be the group's logistics and procurement chief. He was very close to the group's leader Hassan Nasrallah and also, reportedly lost a son during the 2006 Lebanon War.

Matthew Levitt, author of the recent book Hezbollah: The Global Footprint of Lebanon’s Party of God and a senior fellow and director of the Washington Institute for Near East Policy's Stein Program on Counter-terrorism and Intelligence stated that there is "no question, he is very important" and that he was Hezbollah's chief military Arms Procurement and Strategic Weapons officer. He believes that Laqqis was killed by Israel's intelligence service Mossad.

== Assassination and funeral ==
Laqqis was killed in an assassination when reportedly a number of gunmen shot him in the head in his car from close range as he arrived at his home at around midnight of 3–4 December 2013 local Beirut time in the Hadath region, a suburb of the Lebanese capital Beirut. He was rushed to the hospital but died there a few hours later.

A Lebanese Sunni militant group, "Ahrar al-Sunna Baalbek Brigade" (Arabic: لواء أحرار السنة بعلبك ), believed to be a Lebanon-based Al-Qaeda-linked group from the Abdullah Azzam Brigades, claimed responsibility for the attack in a message on Twitter. Hezbollah leader Hassan Nasrallah stated this group "is not a fictitious name... This group exists ... It has its leadership ... and I am convinced it is linked to General Intelligence Presidency." Hezbollah has also claimed Israel was responsible for the assassination. Israel has denied any involvement in the matter.

His funeral was held in Baalbek on 4 December 2013.

== See also ==
- Abdullah Azzam Brigades
- Hassan Nasrallah
- Hezbollah
- List of assassinated Lebanese people
