= Walid Eido =

Lebanese politician (1942–2007)

- Born: 2 April 1942; Beirut, French Mandate of Lebanon
- Died: 13 June 2007 (aged 65); Beirut, Lebanon
- Education: Lebanese University
- Occupations: Judge and politician

Walid Eido (Arabic: وليد عيدو; 2 April 1942 – 13 June 2007) was a member of the Future Movement, Lebanese political movement and a member of the Lebanese Parliament. He was also a member of the March 14 Coalition.

== Early life and education ==
Eido was born on 2 April 1942 to a Sunni Muslim family in the Bachoura neighborhood of Beirut. He graduated from Lebanese University with a degree in law in 1966, and became a magistrate in 1967.

== Career and activities ==
Eido was a member of the Sunni Murabetoun militia during Lebanon's 1975-1990 civil war. In the late 1990s, he was north Lebanon's public prosecutor, but he had to resign for being able to go into politics and run for elections with Rafic Hariri. He was later named as President of the Beirut Court of Appeal, a role from which he resigned in 2000 to be a candidate to the parliamentary elections on the same year.

While on Rafik Hariri's list, a then-unknown Walid Eido was elected as a representative of Beirut's second constituency in 2000 and in 2005. After Syria's withdrawal of Lebanon, Eido became a critic of Syrian President Bashar al-Assad and Lebanese President Émile Lahoud. He was the head of the defense committee and a member of several others in the parliament. On 6 April 2007, Eido asked Lebanon's prime minister Fouad Siniora to end the current standoff and replace the resigned ministers. Eido said "it is time to end this resignation mockery by replacing the resigned ministers in accordance with the constitution so that the government can go back to work."

Eido was a supporter of the tribunal and a close friend of Rafik Hariri. Following the 2006 Lebanon War, Eido reportedly said: “We will sell our blood to buy weapons and confront [Hezbollah]. We will never let them control the country."

== Assassination ==
A parked Mitsubishi Pajero four-wheel vehicle packed with 80 kg (177 lbs) of explosives blew up as Eido's car was driving away from a Beirut beach club on 13 June 2007, murdering him and six other people. His eldest son Khaled was also killed in the blast. Eido was 65 years old.

Several citizens were also killed, two of whom were Nejmeh footballers, Hussein Naeem and Hussein Dokmak. The explosion occurred at the Manara district of western Beirut late afternoon. The bomb detonated around 5:30 pm on a side street between the Nejmeh Football Club and the Luna Park amusement center along Beirut's Corniche, a seaside road dotted with tourist and family destinations such as beach resorts, hotels, and cafés.

Eido was assassinated just three days after the UN Security Council Resolution 1757 came into effect, mandating the establishment of a hybrid Lebanese-international tribunal to investigate suspects of the Hariri assassination and other similar attacks. He was the seventh anti-Syrian politician and third member of the Lebanese parliament killed since the assassination of Rafik Hariri on 14 February 2005. According to sources, his assassination among others are linked to Unit 121, executing Hezbollah's policy. The death of Walid Eido reduced then March 14 alliance's parliamentary majority to 68 out of 126 MPs total. The assassination was condemned by the UN Security Council.

== Personal life ==
Eido was married and a father of three sons, Khaled, Zaher and Mazen. Eido was an avid swimmer. His late eldest son Khaled was a lawyer.

== See also ==
- List of assassinated Lebanese politicians
- List of extrajudicial killings and political violence in Lebanon
