= Mohammad Choucair =

Lebanese politician (1917–1987)

- Born: 1 August 1917; Beirut, Lebanon
- Died: 2 August 1987 (aged 70); West Beirut, Lebanon
- Cause of death: Assassination
- Education: American University of Beirut (BBA, 1933)
- Spouse: Gladys Sarkis
- Children: 4

Mohammad Choucair (1 August 1917 – 2 August 1987) was a Lebanese politician, who was assassinated on 2 August 1987.

== Career ==
Choucair was a special advisor to the former Lebanese president Amine Gemayel. He actively participated in the negotiations of the 1983 peace agreement between Lebanon and Israel.

== Death ==
Choucair was assassinated inside his home in the Syrian controlled part of West Beirut on 2 August 1987. The alleged perpetrators were Syrian agents.

== See also ==
- List of assassinated Lebanese people
