= Al Qanat =

Al Qanat (the Independent in English) is an internet news media outlet based in Beirut, Lebanon. It offers viewers news only in Arabic.
