= Hussein Naeem =

Lebanese footballer (1987–2007)

Personal information
- Full name: Hussein Hassan Naeem
- Date of birth: 19 March 1987
- Place of birth: Selaa, Lebanon
- Date of death: 13 June 2007 (aged 20)
- Place of death: Beirut, Lebanon
- Position: Forward

Youth career
- 2001–2006: Nejmeh

Senior career*
Years	Team	Apps	(Gls)
2006–2007	Nejmeh		
- * Club domestic league appearances and goals

Hussain Hassan Naeem (Arabic: حُسَيْن حَسَن نَعِيم; 19 March 1987 – 13 June 2007) was a Lebanese footballer who played as a forward. He was killed by a car bomb, alongside other victims, in an assassination attempt on Lebanese politician Walid Eido.

== Career ==
Naeem joined the Nejmeh youth team on 2 November 2001, playing for the first team from 2006 until his death in 2007.

== Death ==
On 13 June 2007, Naeem died from the same car bomb which killed politician Walid Eido and teammate Hussein Dokmak outside the Rafic El-Hariri Stadium.
