= Musa Shuaib =

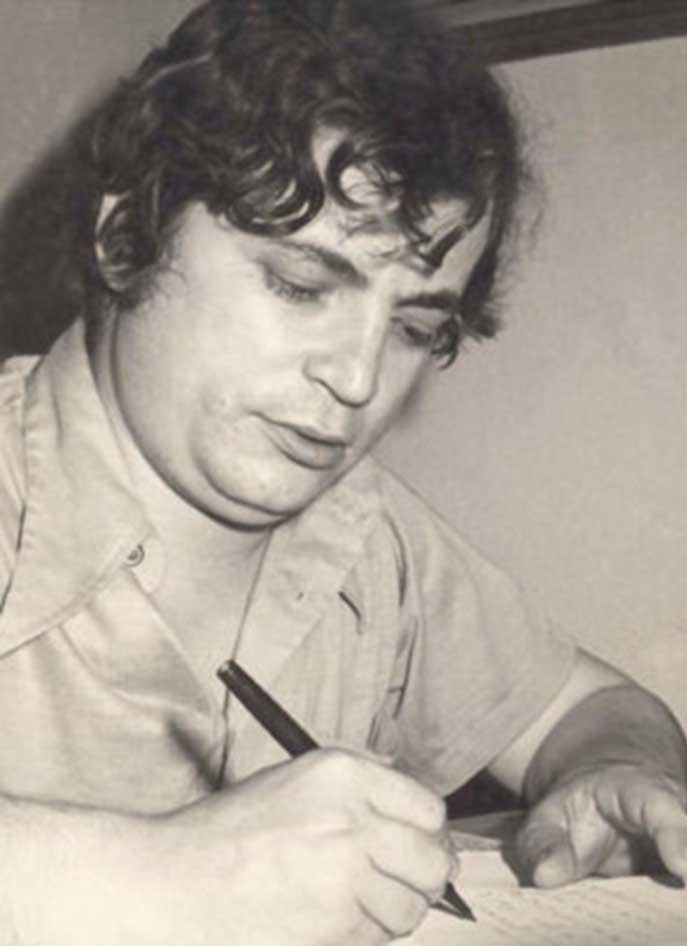

Personal details
- Born: 1943 Charkiyeh, Nabatiyeh District
- Died: 28 July 1980 (aged 36–37)
- Citizenship: Lebanon
- Party: Arab Socialist Ba'ath Party – Iraq Region
- Education: Lebanese University
- Occupation: Politician, poet

Musa Muhammad Ali Shuaib (Arabic: موسى شعيب; born 1943) was a Lebanese poet and politician who was a member of the Arab Socialist Ba'ath Party in Lebanon. He was assassinated on 28 July 1980 in a car bomb attack at Beirut International Airport.

== Early life and education ==
Shuaib was from a prominent southern Shiite family from the Nabatiyeh district of Lebanon started his primary studies at Al Sharqiah Public School and then at Al-Duwair Public School. After that, he moved to Beirut with his brother to continue his high school studies at the International College.

In 1963, his financial circumstances forced him to stop his academic studies and worked as a teacher at Ansar Primary School – Nabatiyeh District. In 1964, after his success in the "Syrian Unified" certificate, he joined the Lebanese University in Beirut and moved to study at the official Basta Intermediate School to be close to the university. In 1968, he obtained a bachelor's degree in Arabic literature from the Faculty of Arts and Humanities, and obtained his master's degree in 1979.

Between 1969 and 1973, he moved as a teacher between schools of the South and Bekaa governorates, until he was removed to Bcharre High School, after being referred to the Disciplinary Council, and then dismissed from his job as a teacher due to his participation in the strikes of teachers, workers, and tobacco farmers.

== Politics ==
Shuaib joined the ranks of the Arab Socialist Ba'ath Party in 1963 and rose through the party ranks to become a member of the regional leadership of the Arab Socialist Ba'ath Party in Lebanon, the Secretary of the Southern Branch, and the party's representative in the Political Council of the Lebanese National Movement .

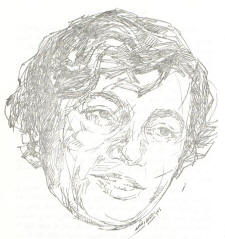
Sketch of Musa Shuaib

Before that, he was active in various social and political fields, such as his support for the Palestinian cause and Arab Unification.

At the beginning of 1972, he announced his candidacy for the parliamentary elections, and alone won more than 3000 votes. In 1974, he was nominated again for the parliamentary by-election in the Nabatiyeh district.

== Literature ==
He began writing poetry at a young age specializing in the genre of Zajal poetry and began to emerge as a poet while he was studying at the Lebanese University. Contributed with a number of southern writers to founding the Southern Literary Forum. He was a member of the Lebanese Writers Union, and played a distinguished role in maintaining its union unity. He was also a founding member of the General Union of Palestinian Writers and Journalists and was a member of the Cultural Council of South Lebanon.

== Death ==
Shuaib, along with three others, was assassinated on 28 July 1980 in a car bomb attack at Beirut International Airport Monday morning.
