= Choutair =

- Town and union council
- Country: Pakistan
- Region: Balochistan
- District: Ziarat District
- Time zone: UTC+5 (PST)

Choutair or Chauter is town and union council of Ziarat District in the Balochistan province of Pakistan. The indigenous tribe is primarily Tareen (Spin Tareen).

Pashto and Wanetsi (Tareeno), which is a unique and archaic dialect of Pashto, are spoken in the town.
