= Hussein Dokmak =

Lebanese footballer (1981–2007)

- Dokmak at Nejmeh

Personal information
- Full name: Hussein Ali Dokmak
- Date of birth: 13 December 1981
- Place of birth: Hanine, Lebanon
- Date of death: 13 June 2007 (aged 25)
- Place of death: Beirut, Lebanon
- Position: Defender

Senior career*
Years	Team	Apps	(Gls)
1997–2007	Nejmeh		
- * Club domestic league appearances and goals

Hussein Ali Dokmak (Arabic: حُسَيْن عَلِيّ دُقْمَاق; 13 December 1981 – 13 June 2007) was a Lebanese footballer who played as a defender. He was killed by a car bomb, alongside other victims, in an assassination attempt on Lebanese politician Walid Eido.

== Career ==
Dokmak joined Nejmeh on 21 May 1997, playing for them until his death in 2007. He was also called up to represent Lebanon internationally at the 2004 AFC Asian Cup qualifiers, but didn't make an appearance.

== Death ==
On 13 June 2007, Dokmak died in the same car bomb which killed politician Walid Eido and teammate Hussein Naeem outside the Rafic El-Hariri Stadium.
