= Strugglers for the Unity and Freedom of al-Sham =

The Strugglers for the Unity and Freedom of al-Sham is a terrorist group who in December 2005 claimed responsibility for the assassination of Gebran Tueni and made threats against Detlev Mehlis. It also claimed the responsibility of Pierre Amine Gemayel's assassination in November 2006.

It may or may not have any relationship to Jund al-Sham.

== See also ==
- Bilad al-Sham
