= Al-Buss refugee camp =

Al-Buss camp مخيم البص
- Refugee camp
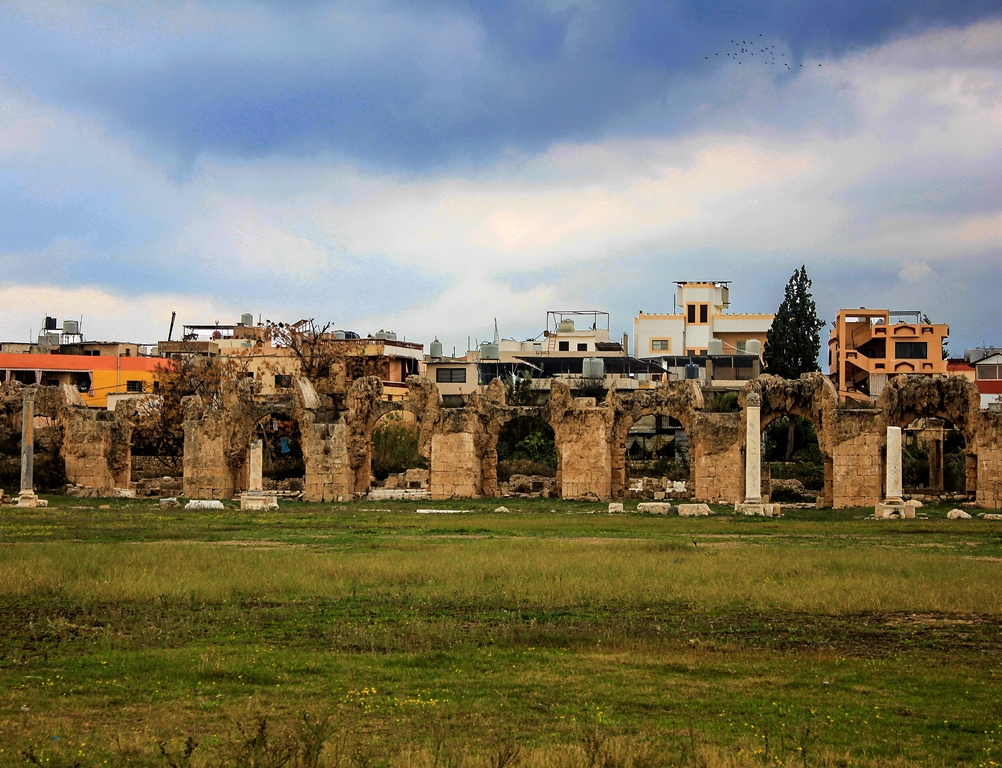
- Remains of a Roman aquaeduct in Al-Buss with the camp in the background

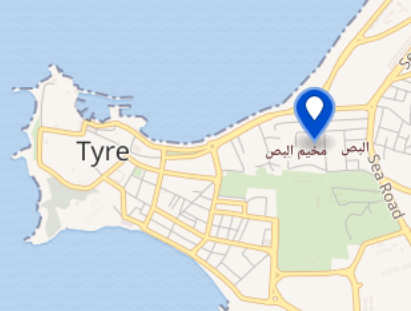

- Location within Lebanon
- Coordinates: 33°16′21″N 35°12′36″E
- Country: Lebanon
- Governorate: South
- District: Tyre
- Founded: 1935–39

Area
  - Total: 1 km^{2} (0.39 sq mi)

Population (2013)
  - Total: 11,254

Al-Buss camp (Arabic: مخيم البص, romanized: Mukhayyam al-Buss) – also transliterated Bass, Al-Bass, or El-Buss with the definite article spelled either al or el – is one of the twelve Palestinian refugee camps in Lebanon, located in the Southern Lebanese city of Tyre. It had been a refuge for survivors of the Armenian genocide from the 1930s until the 1950s, built in a swamp area which during ancient times had for at least one and a half millennia been a necropolis (see article here). In recent decades it has been "at the center of Tyre’s experience with precarity" and "a space that feels permanent yet unfinished, suspended in time."

== Territory ==
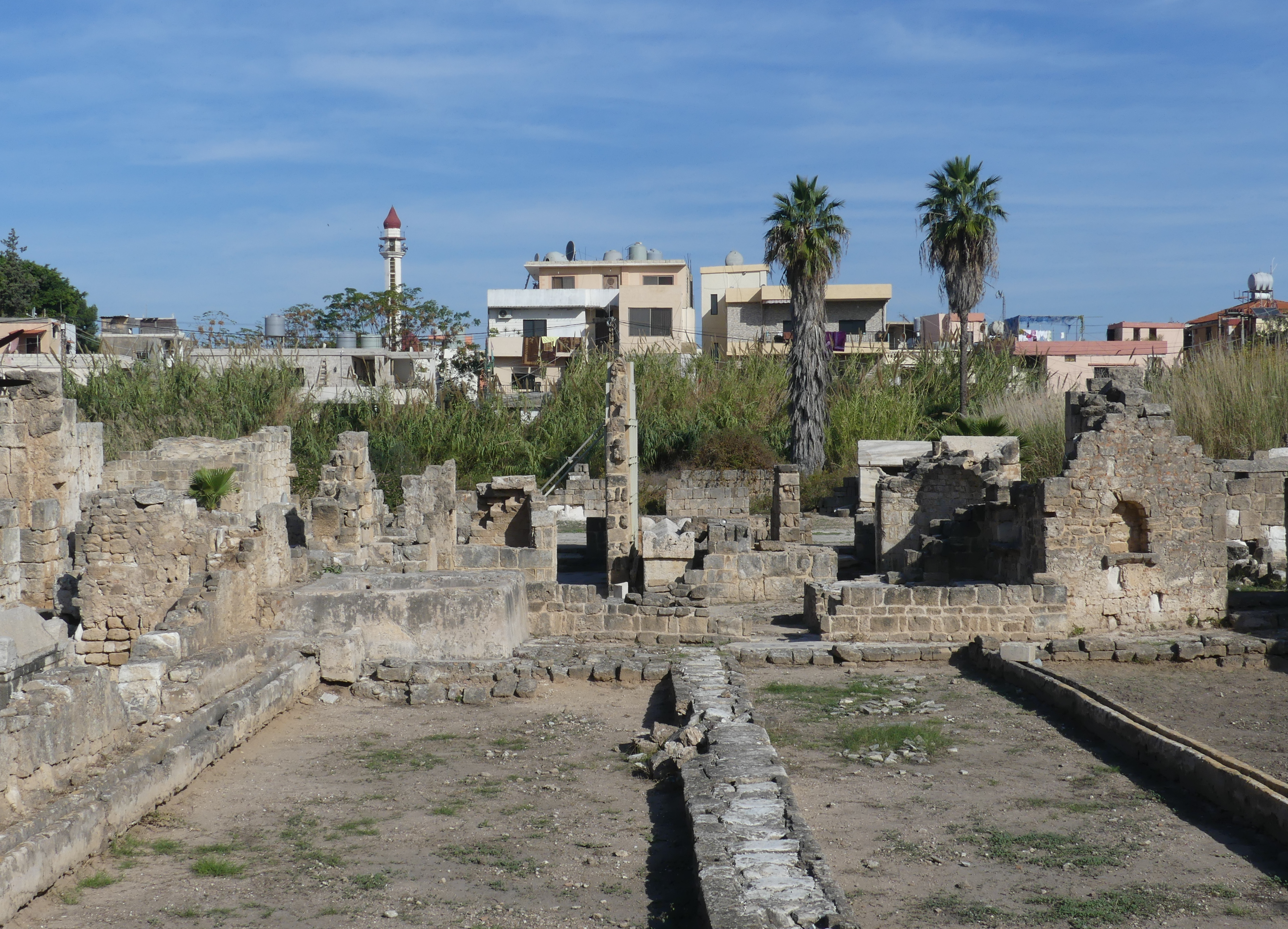
Ancient ruins with the modern buildings of the camp in the back: between the sites are bushes and trees with the remaining marshes

Al-Buss is located in the north-eastern part of the Sour municipality. While Tyre as a whole is commonly known as Sour in Arabic, its urban area comprises parts of four municipalities: Sour, Ain Baal, Al-Aabbassiyah and Burj ash-Shamali. The two latter ones are close to Al-Buss. Burj ash-Shamali, about 2 km to the east of Al-Buss, also hosts a Palestinian refugee camp, while the gathering of Jal al-Baher to the north and the neighbourhood of Maashouq 1 km to the east are informal settlements for Palestinian refugees. To the south of Al-Buss camp – separated through a wall and the remaining water pools of the original marshland – is the vast archaeological site of Al-Buss, which is popular with tourists.

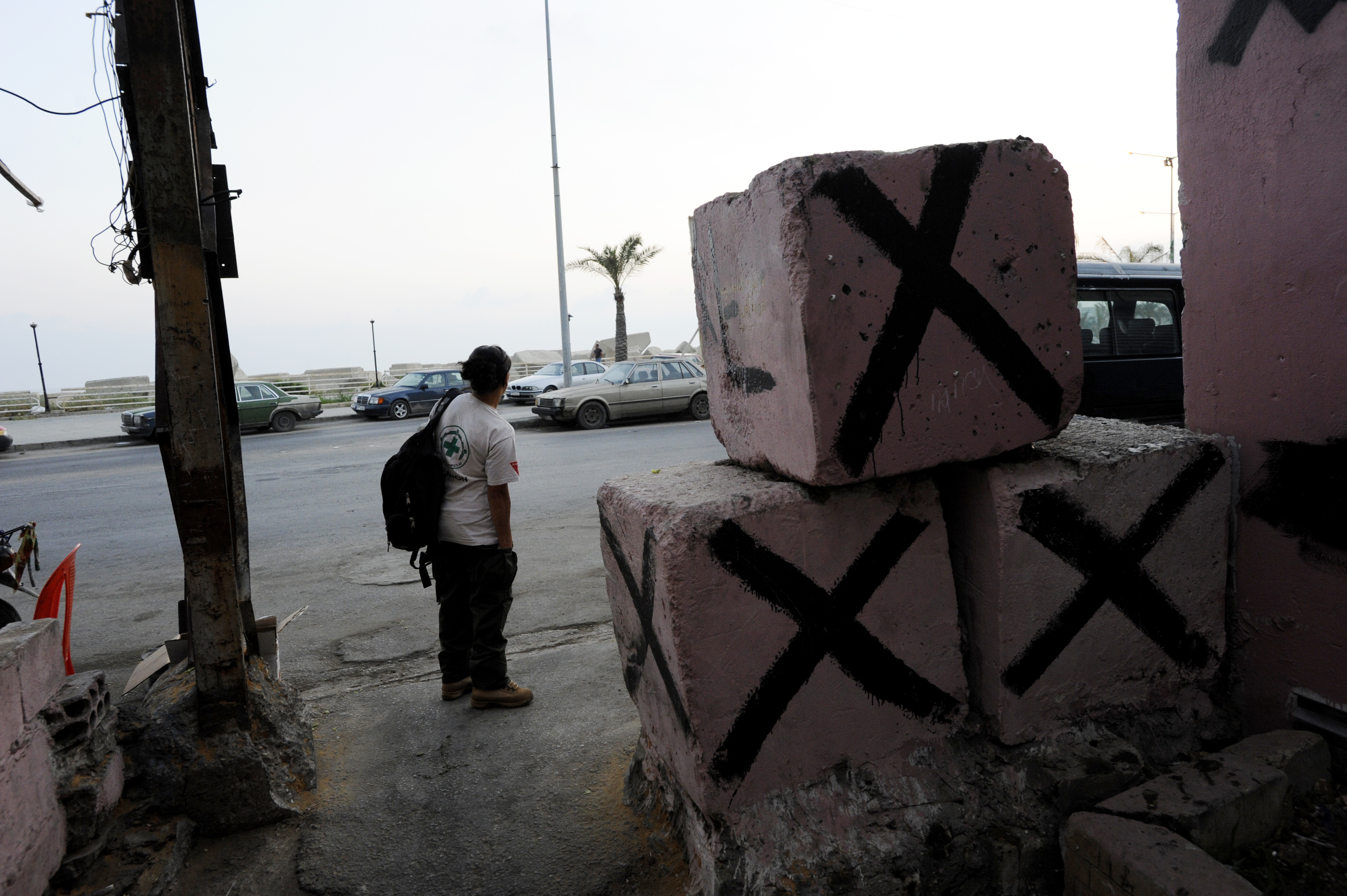
An entrance/exit for pedestrians at the Northern side of Al-Buss camp towards the corniche (Photo by Cluster Munition Coalition/2011)

The camp covers a total area of approximately 1 square kilometer. At its northern side the camp borders the main roads at the entry to the Tyre peninsula and to its eastern side the north-south Beirut-Naqoura Sea Road. Hence, it is severely affected by heavy traffic jams at the crossroads, especially during peak hours at the Al-Buss roundabout. The camp has a number of entrances for pedestrians, but only one – on the south-eastern side – for vehicles. Entry and exit there is controlled at a checkpoint by the Lebanese Armed Forces. Foreign visitors have to present permits from Military Intelligence.

"although it is a labyrinth of tiny alleys crisscrossing each other haphazardly, it is much less crowded and daunting than some of the other camps across the country."

A 2017 census counted 687 buildings with 1,356 households in Al-Buss. Most of the buildings are concrete block shelters, considered to be of poor quality. While the building situation in the eastern part around the former Armenian camp is dense, the western part of the camp has developed in a more informal manner. The many businesses, especially mechanical workshops for cars, on the northern side along the main road integrate the outer fringe of the camp into the townscape. However,

"Though very much a part of the city’s urban fabric, Al-Buss remains a peripheral space".

And as Tyre like all of Southern Lebanon has been marginalised throughout modern history, Al-Buss camp is actually even

"peripheral within the periphery".

== History ==
For the period before the 20th century, see Al-Bass (archaeological site).

=== French Mandate (1920–1943) ===
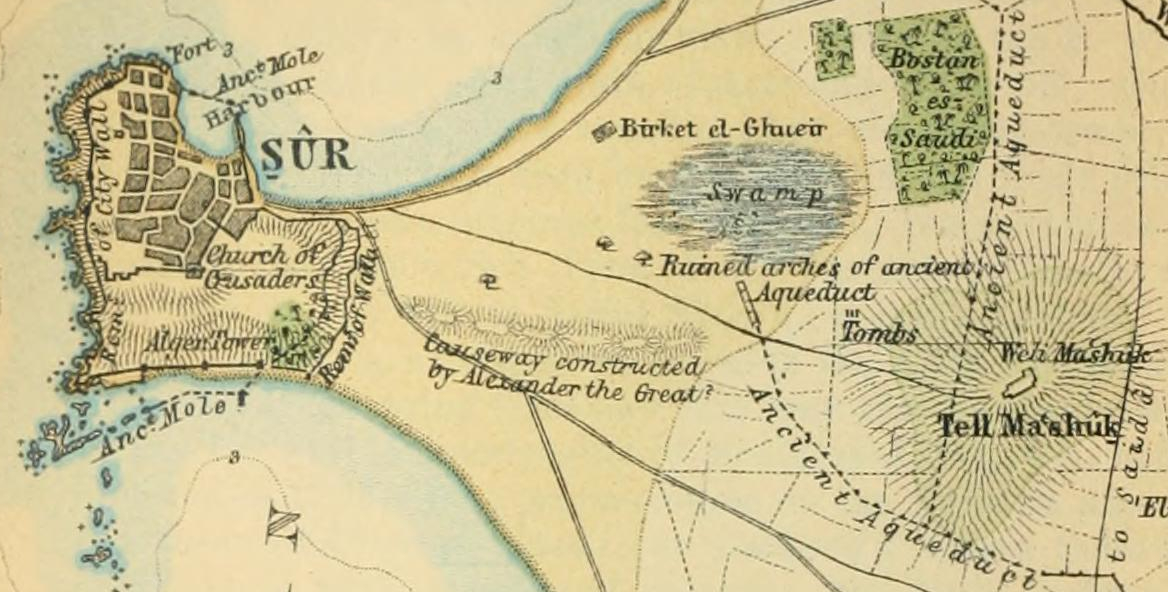
1906 map with Al-Buss as a swamp

On the first of September 1920, the French colonial rulers proclaimed the new State of Greater Lebanon under the guardianship of the League of Nations represented by France. Tyre and the Jabal Amel were attached as the Southern part of the Mandate. The French High Commissioner in Syria and Lebanon became General Henri Gouraud.

==== Armenian refugee camp (1930s) ====
In 1932, the French colonial authorities offered a piece of land of some 30,000 square meters in Al-Buss to the Jabal Amel Ulama Society of Shia clerics and feudal landlords to construct a school there. However, such plans were not realised due to internal divisions of the local power players and a few years later the French rulers attributed the swampy area to survivors of the Armenian Genocide, who had started arriving in Tyre already in the early 1920s, mostly by boat. A branch of the Armenian General Benevolent Union had been founded there in 1928.

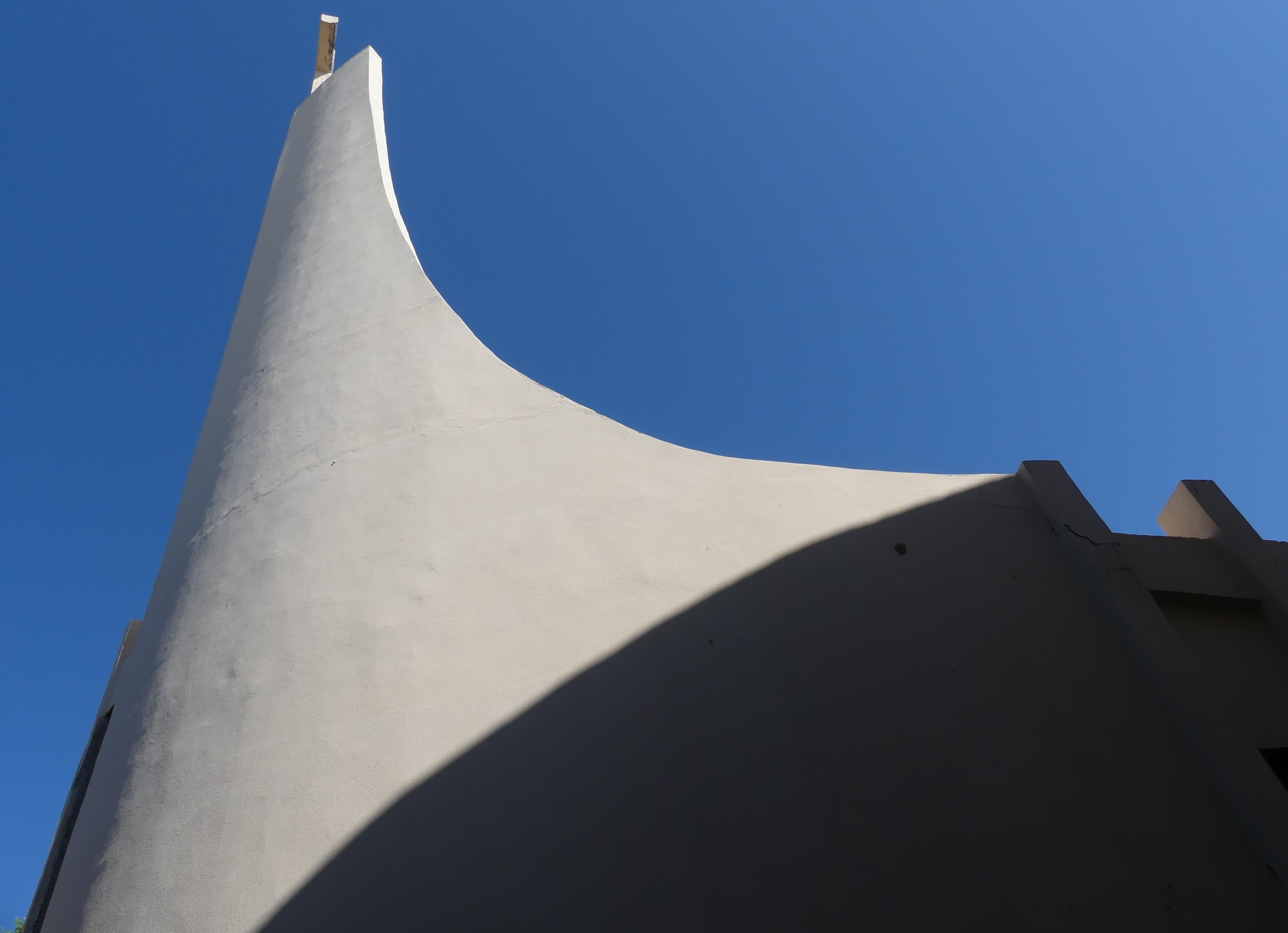
Saint Paul's church

It is unclear when exactly the camp for Armenian refugees was set up. According to some sources it was in 1935–36, when also another camp was built in Rashidieh on the coast, five kilometres south of Tyre city. However, the United Nations Relief and Works Agency for Palestine Refugees in the Near East (UNRWA) states that Al-Buss camp was constructed in 1937, whereas the United Nations Human Settlements Programme (UN HABITAT) dates it to 1939.

During the following years – neither the exact dates are known nor the Christian denominations – an Armenian chapel and a church were constructed in Al-Buss camp. The defunct chapel is nowadays part of an UNRWA school building, while the church of Saint Paul belongs to the Maronite Catholic Archeparchy of Tyre and is still in service.

On 8 June 1941, a joint British-Free French Syria–Lebanon campaign liberated Tyre from the Nazi collaborators of Marshal Pétain's Vichy regime.

=== Lebanese independence (1943) ===
Lebanon gained independence from French colonial rule on 22 November 1943. The Maronite political leader Émile Eddé – a former Prime Minister and President – reportedly suggested to the Zionist leader Chaim Weizmann that a Christian Lebanon

"should relinquish some portions of the no longer wanted territory, but to the Jewish state-in-the-making. It could have Tyre and Sidon and the 100,000 Muslims living there, but when he put the matter to Weizmann, even he balked at what he called a gift which bites

=== 1948/9 Palestinian exodus ===
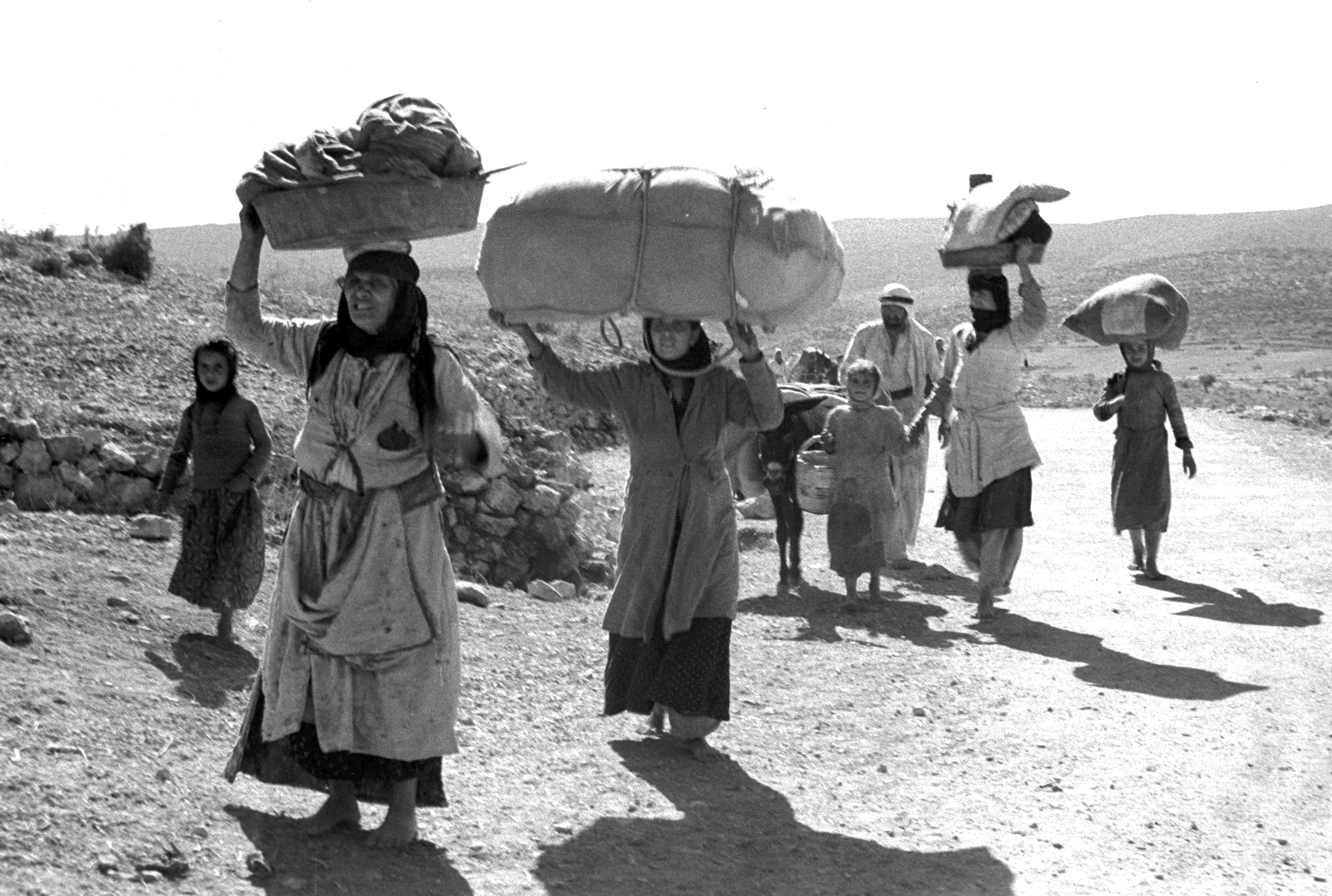
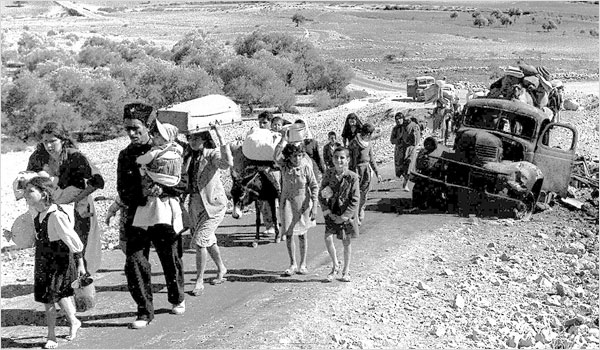
Palestinian refugees making their way from Galilee to Lebanon in October–November 1948

When the state of Israel was declared in May 1948, Tyre was immediately affected: with the Palestinian exodus – also known as the Nakba' – thousands of Palestinian refugees fled to the city, often by boat. Al-Buss was one of the first sites which was assigned to the Palestinian refugees as a transit camp. The majority of the first wave of Palestinians who arrived in Al-Buss were Palestinian Christians from Haifa and Akka. Most of them only found shelter in tents there.

Soon the camp was overcrowded and more camps were set up in other parts of the country. Initially, Armenians and Palestinians cohabited in the camp. In the course of the 1950s, the Armenian refugees from Al-Buss were resettled to the Anjar area, while Palestinians from the Acre area in Galilee moved into the camp. Many of them were apparently agriculturalists. Before UNRWA opened its first school in Al-Buss, children received education under the roof of the church or chapel.

In 1957, large-scale excavations of the Roman-Byzantine necropolis in Al-Buss started under the leadership of Emir Maurice Chéhab (1904–1994), "the father of modern Lebanese archaeology" who for decades headed the Antiquities Service in Lebanon and was the curator of the National Museum of Beirut. The works stopped in 1967 and because of the political turmoil that followed Chehab could not take them up again. Publication of his research materials was never completed either. The whereabouts of most of the finds and the excavation documentation are unknown.

In 1965, residents of Al-Buss gained access to electricity.

After the Six-Day War of June 1967 another wave of displaced Palestinians sought refuge in South Lebanon. In the following year, Al-Buss camp had 3,911 registered inhabitants. As Tyre greatly expanded during the 1960s due to an increasing a rural-to-urban movement and many new buildings were constructed on the isthmus of the peninsula, Al-Buss became physically more integrated into the city. The solidarity of the Lebanese Tyrians with the Palestinians was especially demonstrated in January 1969 through a general strike to demand the repulsion of Israeli attacks on Palestinian targets in Beirut.

At the same time though, the arrival of civilian refugees went along with an increasingly strong presence of Palestinian Militants. Thus, clashes between Palestinians and Israel increased dramatically: On 12 May 1970, the IDF launched a number of attacks in South Lebanon, including Tyre. The Palestinian insurgency in South Lebanon escalated further after the conflict of Black September 1970 between the Jordanian Armed Forces (JAF) and the Palestine Liberation Organization (PLO). The PLO leadership under Yasir Arafat relocated to Lebanon, where it essentially created a state within a state and recruited young fighters – known as fedayeen – in the refugee camps.

The 1973 October Yom Kippur War signalled even more Palestinian military operations from Southern Lebanese territory, including Tyre, which in turn increasingly sparked Israeli retaliation.

In the following year, the Iran-born Shiite cleric Sayed Musa Sadr who had become the Shia Imam of Tyre in 1959, founded Harakat al-Mahroumin ("Movement of the Deprived") and one year later – shortly before the beginning of the Lebanese Civil War – its de facto military wing: Afwaj al-Muqawama al-Lubnaniyya (Amal). Military training and weaponry for its fighters was initially provided by Arafat's PLO-faction Fatah, but Sadr increasingly distanced himself from them as the situation escalated into a civil war:

=== Lebanese Civil War (1975–1990) ===
In January 1975, a unit of the Popular Front for the Liberation of Palestine (PFLP) attacked the Tyre barracks of the Lebanese Army. The assault was denounced by the PLO as "a premeditated and reckless act". However, two months later, a PLO commando of eight militants sailed from the coast of Tyre to Tel Aviv to mount the Savoy Hotel attack, during which eight civilian Hostages and three Israeli soldiers were killed as well as seven of the attackers. Israel retaliated by launching a string of attacks on Tyre "from land, sea and air" in August and September 1975.

Then, in 1976, local commanders of the PLO took over the municipal government of Tyre with support from their allies of the Lebanese Arab Army. They occupied the army barracks, set up roadblocks and started collecting customs at the port. However, the new rulers quickly lost support from the Lebanese-Tyrian population because of their "arbitrary and often brutal behavior".

By 1977, the UNRWA census put the population of El Buss camp at 4,643. As their situation deteriorated, emigration to Europe increased. At first, a group of graduates went to what was then West-Berlin, because entry via East-Berlin did not require travel visa. Many settled there or in West Germany:

"They concentrated on working in the catering and the construction sectors. They still, however, maintained close connections with their country of departure by sending money to their families remaining in Lebanon. When they acquired German citizenship or valid residence permits they were able to visit their families in Lebanon. Afterwards, as their savings grew, they were able to facilitate the arrival of close relatives (e.g., brother, parent, sister). In many cases, their integration into German society was further enhanced by marriage with Germans."

At the same time, most of the Christian population gradually moved out of the camp. Allegedly, many of them were granted Lebanese citizenship by the Maronite ruling class in a demographic attempt to compensate for the many Lebanese Christians who emigrated.

In 1977, three Lebanese fishermen in Tyre lost their lives in an Israeli attack. Palestinian militants retaliated with rocket fire on the Israeli town of Nahariya, leaving three civilians dead. Israel in turn retaliated by killing "over a hundred" mainly Lebanese Shiite civilians in the Southern Lebanese countryside. Some sources reported that these lethal events took place in July, whereas others dated them to November. According to the latter, the IDF also conducted heavy airstrikes as well as artillery and gunboat shelling on Tyre and surrounding villages, but especially on the Palestinian refugee camps in Rashidieh, Burj El Shimali and El Bass.

==== 1978 South Lebanon conflict with Israel ====
On 11 March 1978, Dalal Mughrabi – a young woman from the Palestinian refugee camp of Sabra in Beirut – and a dozen Palestinian fedayeen fighter sailed from Tyre to a beach north of Tel Aviv. Their attacks on civilian targets became known as the Coastal Road massacre that killed 38 Israeli civilians, including 13 children, and wounded 71. According to the United Nations, the

PLO "claimed responsibility for that raid. In response, Israeli forces invaded Lebanon on the night of 14/15 March, and in a few days occupied the entire southern part of the country except for the city of Tyre and its surrounding area."

Nevertheless, Tyre was badly affected in the fighting during the Operation Litani. The Israel Defense Forces (IDF) targeted especially the harbour on claims that the PLO received arms from there and the Palestinian refugee camps. El Buss suffered extensive damage from Israeli air and navy attacks.

"On 15 March 1978, the Lebanese Government submitted a strong protest to the Security Council against the Israeli invasion, stating that it had no connection with the Palestinian commando operation. On 19 March, the Council adopted resolutions 425 (1978) and 426 (1978), in which it called upon Israel immediately to cease its military action and withdraw its forces from all Lebanese territory. It also decided on the immediate establishment of the United Nations Interim Force in Lebanon (UNIFIL). The first UNIFIL troops arrived in the area on 23 March 1978."

However, the Palestinian forces were unwilling to give up their positions in and around Tyre. UNIFIL was unable to expel those militants and sustained heavy casualties. It therefore accepted an enclave of Palestinian fighters in its area of operation which was dubbed the "Tyre Pocket". In effect, the PLO kept ruling Tyre with its Lebanese allies of the National Lebanese Movement (NLM), which was in disarray though after the 1977 assassination of its leader Kamal Jumblatt.

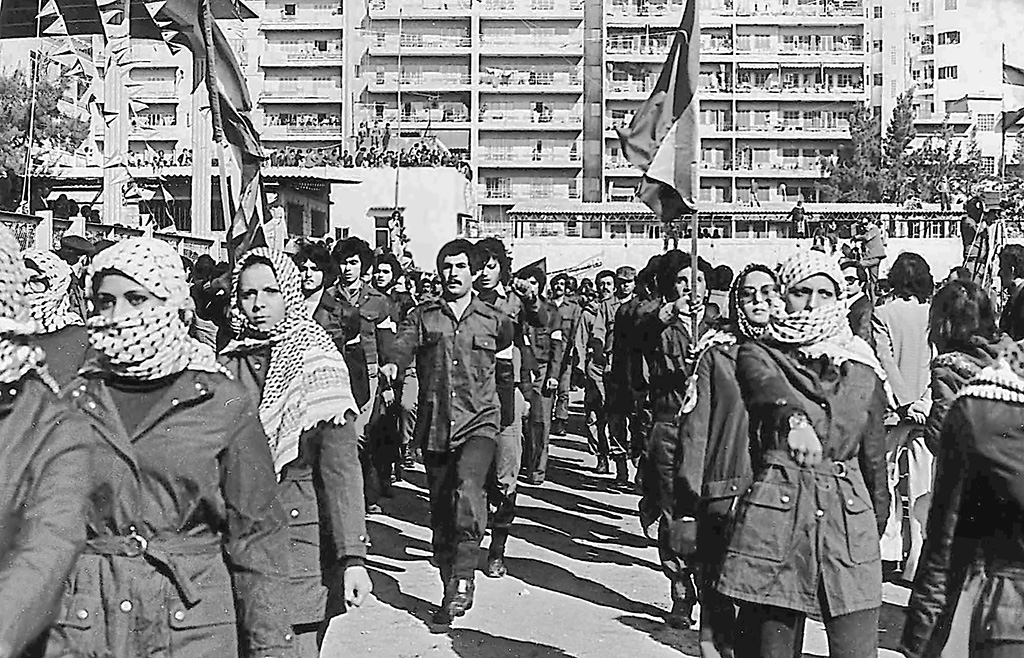
Fedayeen from Fateh at a rally in Beirut, 1979

Frequent IDF bombardments of Tyre from ground, sea and air raids continued after 1978. In January 1979, Israel started naval attacks on the city. The PLO reportedly converted itself into a regular army by purchasing large weapon systems, including Soviet WWII-era T-34 tanks, which it deployed in the "Tyre Pocket" with an estimated 1,500 fighters.

On 27 April 1981, the Irish UNIFIL-soldier Kevin Joyce got kidnapped by a Palestinian faction from his observation post near the village of Dyar Ntar and, "according to UN intelligence reports, was taken to a Palestinian refugee camp in Tyre. He was shot dead a few weeks later following a gun battle between Palestinians and UN soldiers in south Lebanon."

The PLO kept shelling into Galilee until a cease-fire in July 1981. On the 23rd of that month, the IDF had bombed Tyre.

As discontent within the Shiite population about the suffering from the conflict between Israel and the Palestinian factions grew, so did tensions between Amal and the Palestinian militants. The power struggle was exacerbated by the fact that the PLO supported Saddam Hussein's camp during the Iraq-Iran-War, whereas Amal sided with Teheran. Eventually, the political polarisation between the former allies escalated into violent clashes in many villages of Southern Lebanon, including the Tyre area.

==== 1982 Israeli invasion ====
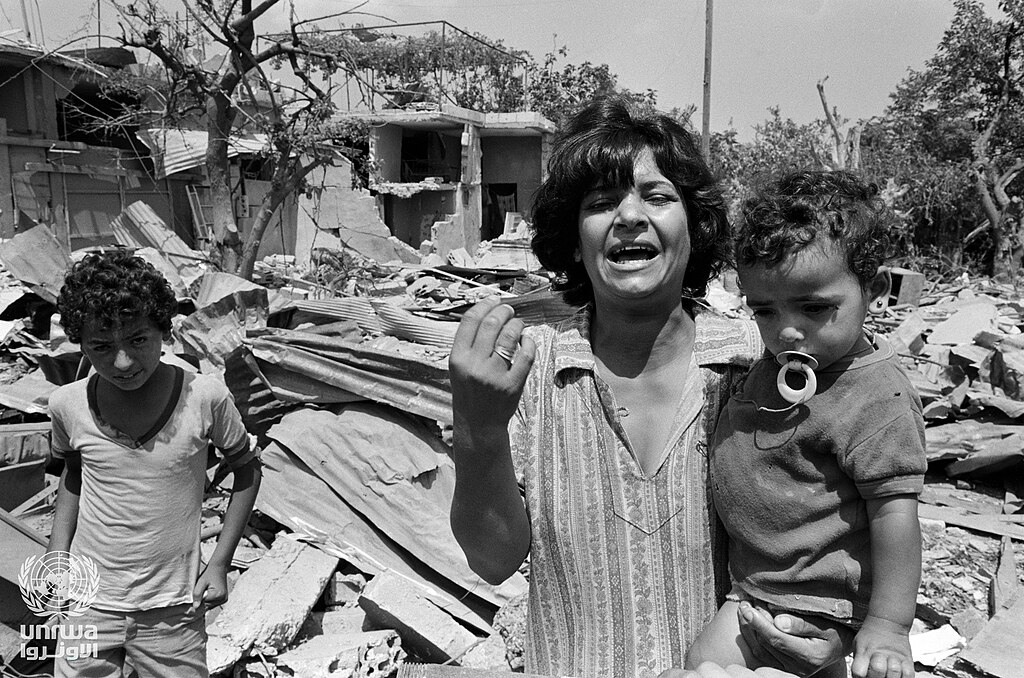
A mother cries in front of destroyed buildings in El Buss camp, after the Israeli invasion in June 1982

Following an assassination attempt on Israeli ambassador Shlomo Argov in London the IDF started an invasion of Lebanon on 6 June 1982, which heavily afflicted Tyre once again: Shelling by Israeli artillery and air raids killed some 80 people on the first day across the city. The Palestinian camps were bearing the brunt of the assault, as many guerillas fought till the end. Though El Buss was less affected than other camps, a contemporary United Nations report found that half of the houses in the camp were either badly damaged or destroyed during the invasion. The Advisory Committee on Human Rights of the American Friends Service Committee termed the destruction of homes in El-Buss "systematic". As a consequence, the drive to emigrate from El-Buss increased further:

"Some of the refugees, in particular those who were injured or whose dwellings were completely destroyed, sought to leave Lebanon indefinitely. Connection between internal migration and international migration was effected at that time. Denmark and Sweden agreed to accept these refugees. Germany too continued to receive some of them. The migratory field thus extended to new countries further north, whilst Germany, the previous principal recipient country, now became primarily a country of transit towards Scandinavia."

In 1984, the United Nations Educational, Scientific and Cultural Organisation (UNESCO) declared Tyre, including el Buss, a World Heritage Site in an attempt to halt the damage being done to the archaeological sites by the armed conflict and by anarchic urban development.

==== 1985–1988 War of the Camps: Amal vs. PLO ====
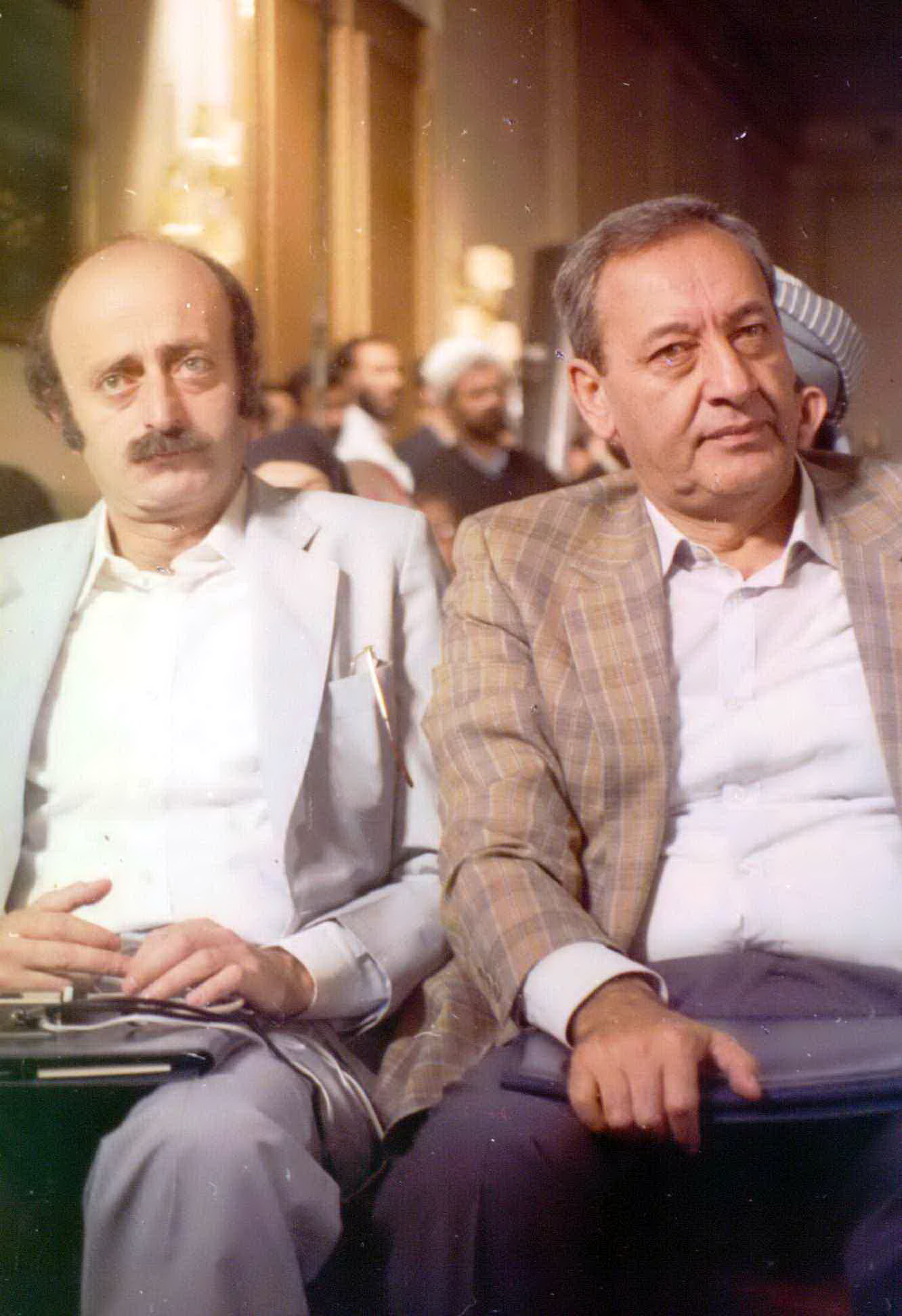
Walid Jumblatt and Nabih Berri in 1989

Under the growing pressure of suicide attacks by Hezbollah, the Israeli forces withdrew from Tyre by the end of April 1985 and instead established a self-declared "Security Zone" in Southern Lebanon with its collaborating militia allies of the South Lebanon Army (SLA). Tyre was left outside the SLA control though and taken over by the Amal Movement under the leadership of Nabih Berri:

"The priority of Amal remained to prevent the return of any armed Palestinian presence to the South, primarily because this might provoke renewed Israeli intervention in recently evacuated areas. The approximately 60,000 Palestinian refugees in the camps around Tyre (al-Bass, Rashidiya, Burj al-Shimali) were cut off from the outside world, although Amal never succeeded in fully controlling the camps themselves. In the Sunni 'canton' of Sidon, the armed PLO returned in force."

Tensions between Amal and Palestinian militants soon escalated once again and eventually exploded into the War of the Camps, which is considered as "one of the most brutal episodes in a brutal civil war": In September 1986, a group of Palestinians fired on an Amal patrol at Rashidieh. After one month of siege, Amal attacked the refugee camp in the South of Tyre. It was reportedly assisted by the Progressive Socialist Party of Druze leader Walid Jumblatt, whose father Kamal had entered into and then broken an alliance with Amal-founder Musa Sadr, as well as by the pro-Syrian Palestinian militia As-Saiqa and the "Popular Front for the Liberation of Palestine – General Command". Fighting spread and continued for one month. By that time some 7,000 refugees in the Tyre area were displaced once more: On December 3, El Buss was taken over by Amal, as it "overran the unarmed camps of El Buss and Burj el-Shemali, burning homes and taking more than a thousand men into custody." At the same time, many Lebanese Shiite families who were displaced from the Israeli-occupied southern "security zone" started building an informal neighbourhood on the Western side next to the camp. Meanwhile, emigration for Palestinians from El Bus to Europe became increasingly difficult, since favourite destinations like Germany and Scandinavia adopted more restrictive asylum policies:

"A transnational field emerged with the circulation of information, and, to a lesser extent, of people, between the Palestinians still residing in Al Buss and those of Europe."

In the late 1980s, "clandestine excavations" took place in the Al-Bass cemetery which "flooded the antiquities market". In 1990, a necropolis from the Iron Age was discovered in El Buss "by chance".

=== Post-Civil War (since 1991) ===
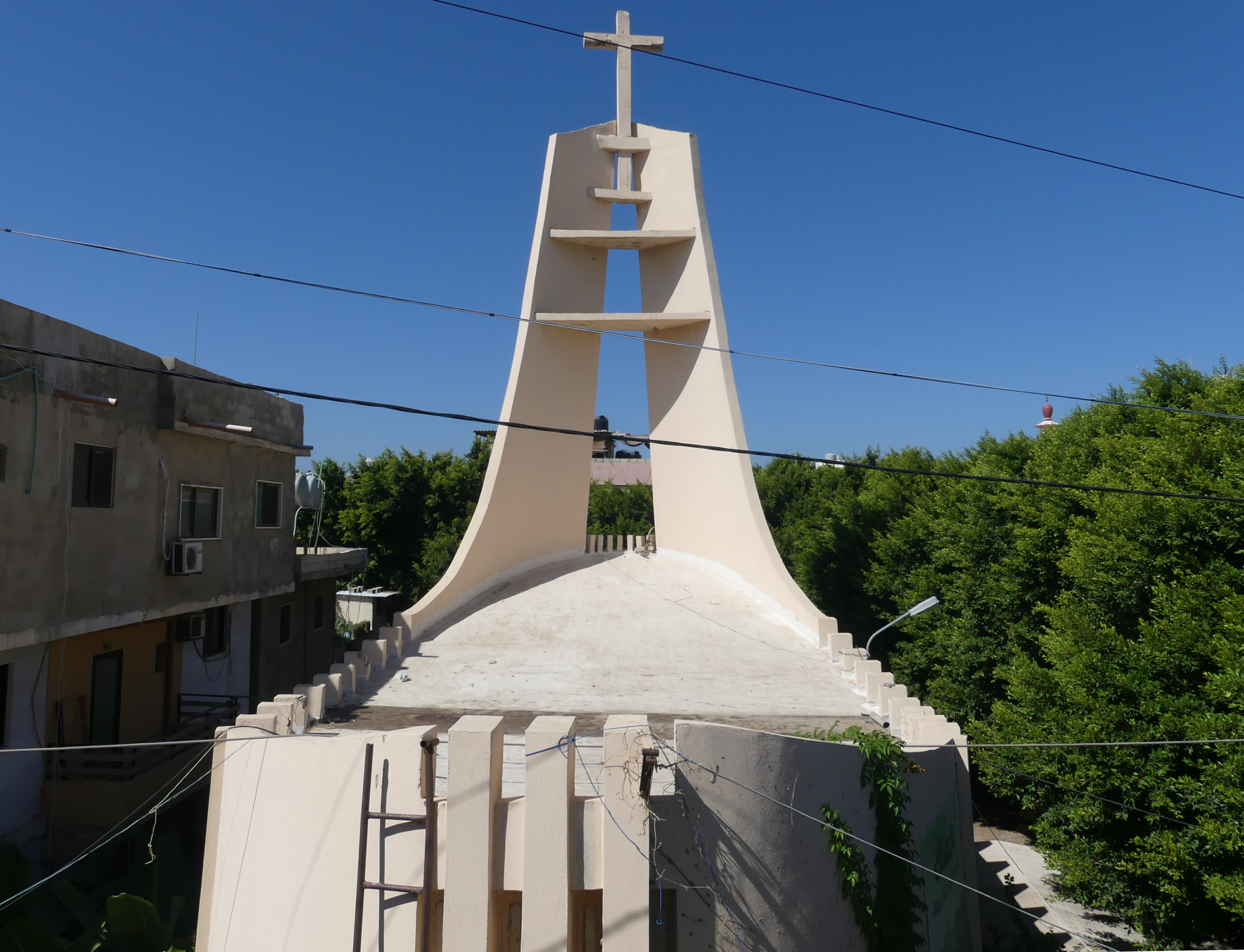
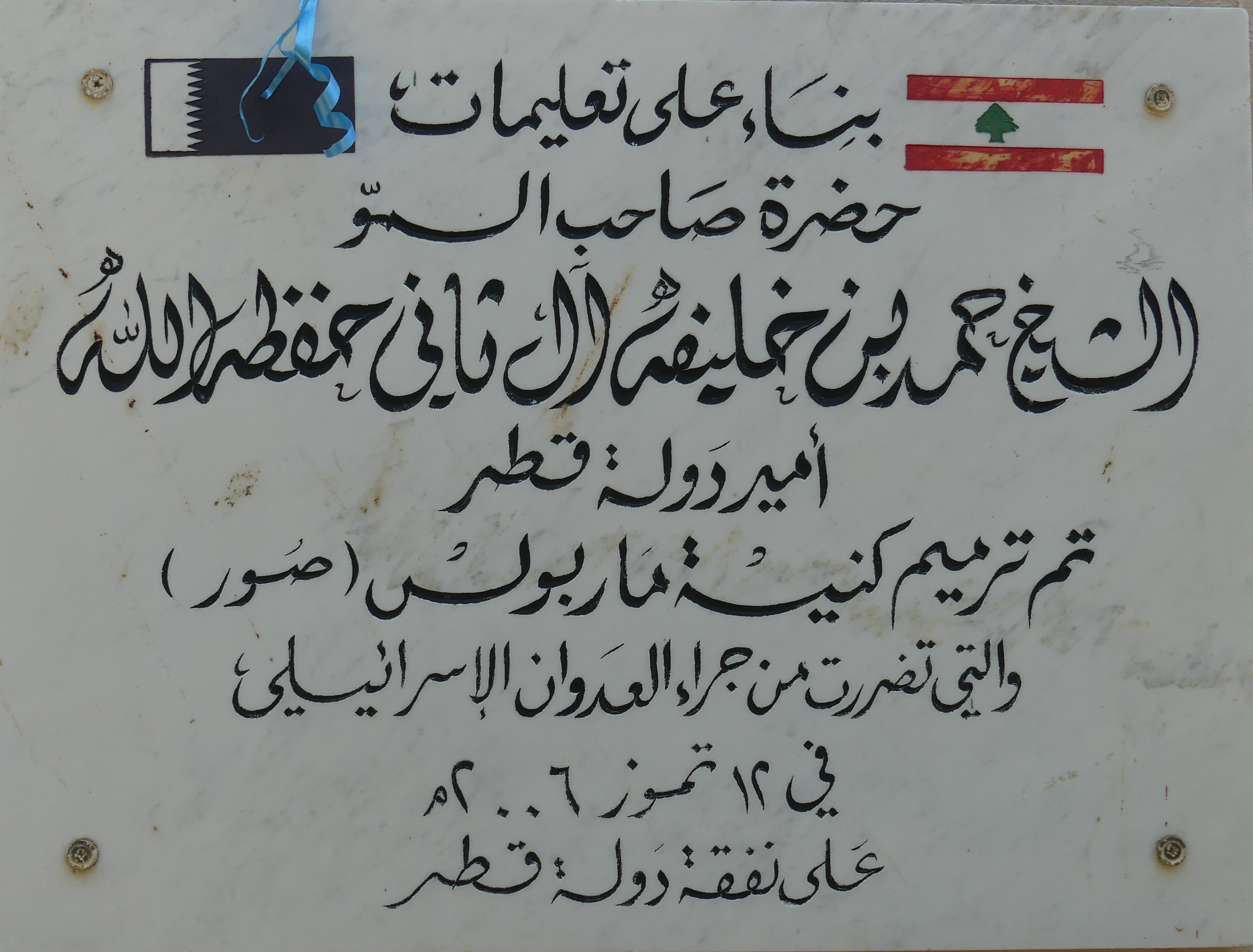
The sky over Al-Buss and the commemorative plaque at St. Paul's

Following the end of the war in March 1991 based on the Taif Agreement, units of the Lebanese Army deployed along the coastal highway and around the Palestinian refugee camps of Tyre, including Al-Buss.

The patterns of emigration changed through the 1990s, as European border regimes further tightened:

"The geographical extension of the migratory field widened and touched countries such as the United Kingdom and Belgium. The three principal host countries (Germany, Sweden, and Denmark) continued to play a central role in this migratory system, but increasingly as transit countries."

At the end of the decade, UNRWA estimated the population to be 9,498.

In 1997, Spanish-led archaeological excavations started at Al-Buss. They were conducted for eleven years and exposed an area of some 500 square meter of cremation graves.

In 2005 the Lebanese government abolished long-standing limitations for residents of Al-Buss to add a storey to their house. After the lifting of such spatial restrictions the camp witnessed a densification in its buildings.

During Israel's invasion in the July 2006 Lebanon War, Al-Buss was apparently less affected than other parts of Tyre, especially compared to the badly hit Burj ash-Shamali. However, at least one building close to the necropolis was hit by Israeli bombardments which also caused damage to a part of the frescoes of a Roman funerary cave. This may have been the area of the Maronite Saint Paul's church on the Eastern edge of the camp since a commemorative plaque there notes that the religious building was damaged by Israeli air strikes on 12 July and later rebuilt with funding from the Emir of Qatar.

When the Palestinian refugee camp of Nahr El Bared in northwestern Lebanon was largely destroyed in 2007 because of heavy fighting between the Lebanese Army and the militant Sunni Islamist group Fatah al-Islam, some of its residents fled to Al-Buss.

In 2007/8, fresh water, wastewater, and stormwater systems were rehabilitated, apparently by UNRWA. Until then, the sewage networks in Al-Buss were above the ground. While the quality of life was improved by those measures, it may be argued that they were also

"affirming these structures’ permanence within a broader context of suspended time."

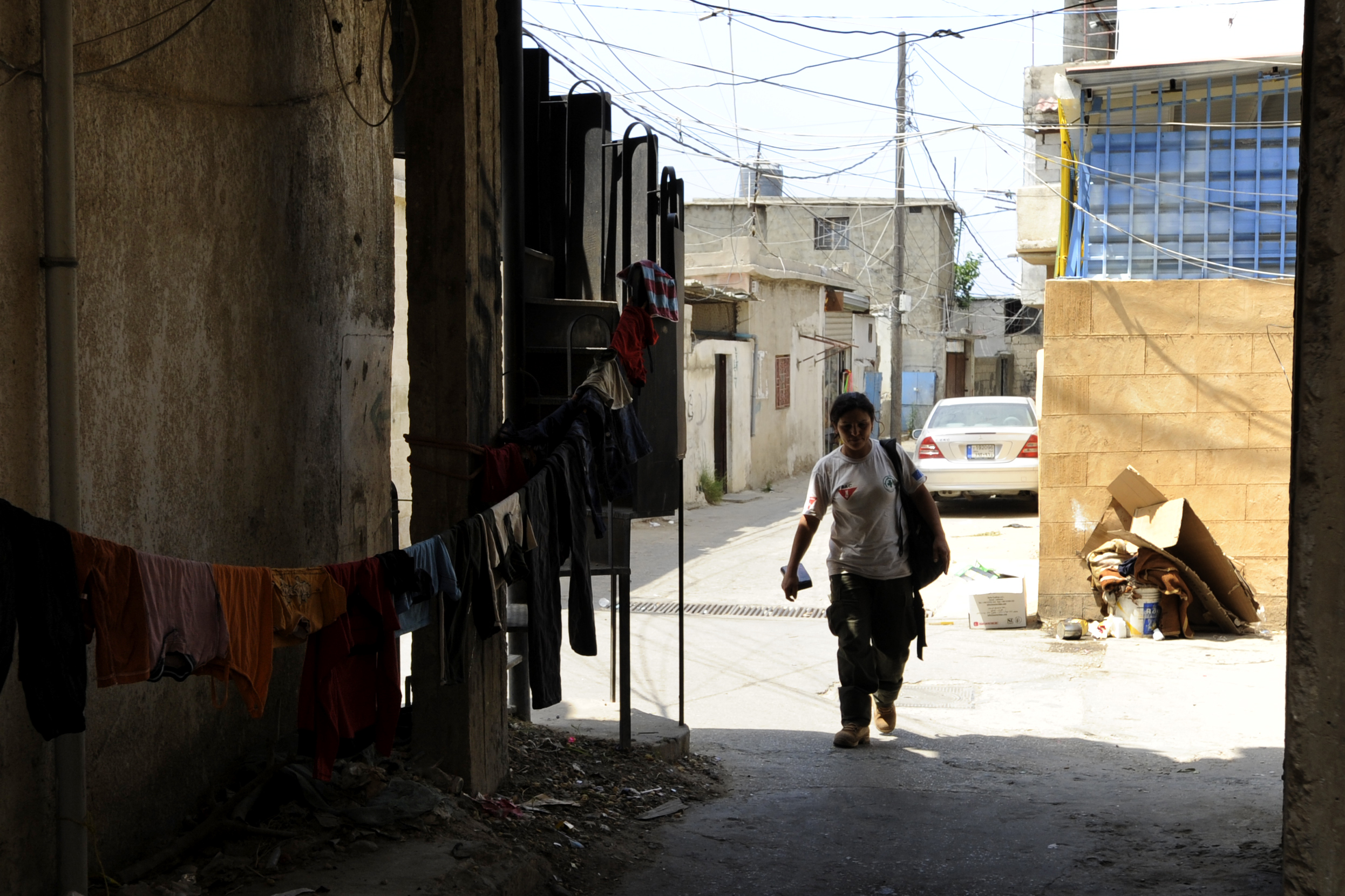
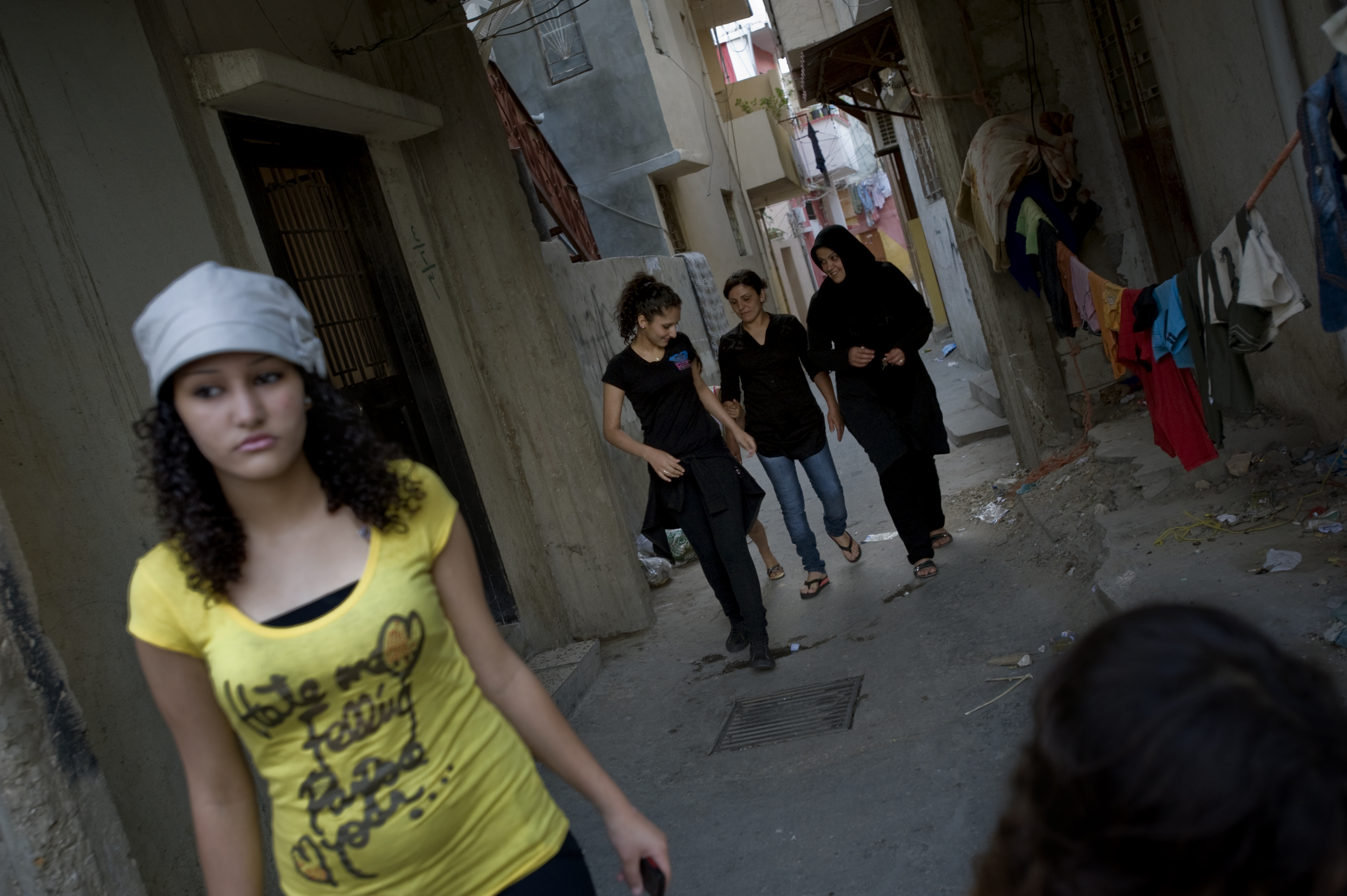
Streets of El Buss in 2011 (Photos by Cluster Munition Coalition)

In September 2010, three people were reportedly wounded after a dispute between clerics loyal to either Fatah or Hamas resulted in armed clashes. A study by the German leftwing Rosa Luxemburg Foundation found that while Fatah is the leading faction in the camp and thus dominates the ruling Popular Committee, a host of other parties have supporters there as well, both secular and religious ones. Apart from Hamas they are the Democratic Front for the Liberation of Palestine (DFLP), the Popular Front for the Liberation of Palestine (PFLP), the Palestinian People's Party, the Palestinian Liberation Front (PLF), the Arab Liberation Front (ALF), the al-Nidal Front, the Islamic Jihad Movement, the Shabiha-militia, Ansar Allah and the al-Tahrir party.

== Demographics ==
In 2014 Christians made up 83.14% and Muslims made up 16.86% of registered voters in Al-Buss. 80.24% of the voters were Armenians.

=== Refugees ===
According to UN estimates, more than 500 refugees who fled from the Syrian civil war settled in Al-Buss. Low-cost housing made Al-Buss a prime choice for them. Most were Palestinians who arrived soon after the beginning of the armed conflict in 2012, adding

"another dimension of precarity to life in the camp".

As of June 2018, there were 12,281 registered refugees in the Al-Buss camp, though this does not necessarily represent the actual number as many have left over the years, Northern Europe, and UNRWA does not track them. In fact,

"the camp is not very lively; most of its people live abroad".

== Economy ==
According to a 2016 study by UN HABITAT, residents of Al-Buss mainly work in construction and other technical jobs, particularly in the metal workshops along its Northern side, though many of them are apparently owned by Lebanese. In addition, many men work as day labourers in seasonal agriculture, mainly in the citrus plantations of the Greater Tyre plains area. However, levels of unemployment are high.

"Emigration and a desire to escape the confines of the camp pervade life in Al-Buss. It is a topic that occupies most conversations and is the ultimate goal of the youth that live in the camp."

The French anthropologist Sylvain Perdigon – who lived in the Al-Buss camp in 2006/2007 and has been a lecturer at the American University of Beirut (AUB) since 2013 – found through his fieldwork that these precarious labor conditions make emigration the only "thinkable, desirable route" away from a dead-end future for many residents. According to his findings, the preferred destination for them is Germany.

== Education ==
UNRWA’s Al Chajra middle school in Al-Buss camp provides education for up to 900 students. There are three other schools as well and about five kindergartens. While some children attend educational institutions outside of the camp, others who live outside the camp commute to el Buss to go to school there.

In August 2019, the 17-year-old Ismail Ajjawi – a Palestinian graduate of the UNRWA Deir Yassin High School in Al-Buss – made global headlines when he scored top-results to earn a scholarship to study at Harvard, but was deported upon arrival in Boston despite valid visa. He was readmitted ten days later to start his studies in time.

== Health care ==
Al-Buss is considered unique among the twelve Palestinian refugee camps in Lebanon in that there is a Lebanese public hospital within its boundaries. Located at its Eastern edge, it was reportedly constructed before 1948 and has been used mostly by Lebanese patients, especially members of the military forces. There is also a clinic operated by UNRWA, and medical laboratory for essential tests, including an X-Ray machine. Some non-governmental organisations, both local and international ones, offer health services, for instance helping children with disabilities.

== Cultural life ==
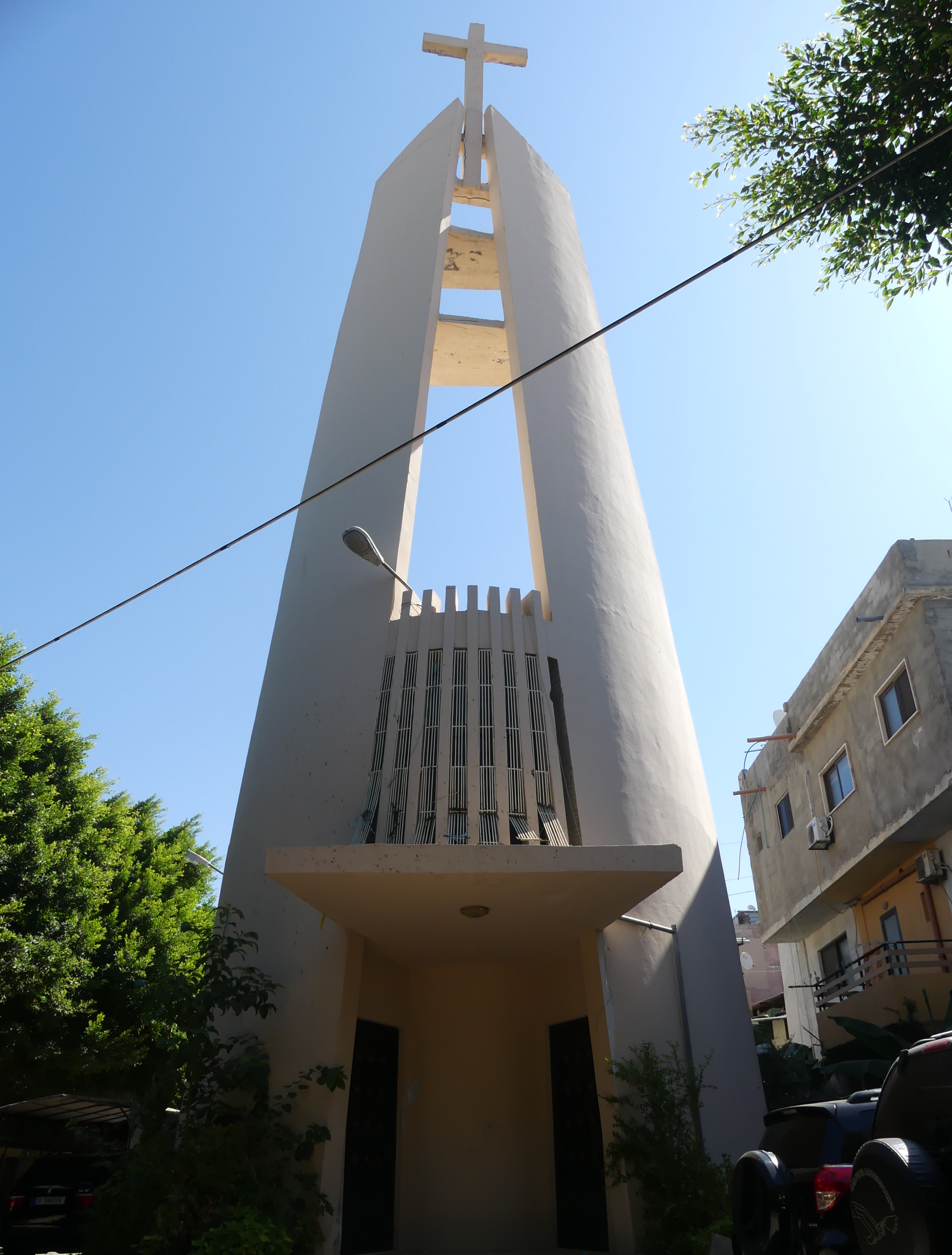
The Maronite church of Saint Paul in Al-Buss

Al-Buss is also considered to be unique among the Palestinian refugee camps in Lebanon that it hosts the Maronite church of Saint Paul, which is attended both by Palestinian and Lebanese Christians. This fact, along with the Lebanese public hospital, has been said to contribute to a higher degree of integration between Lebanese and Palestinians. The number of houses inhabited by Palestinian Christians, which reportedly used to be around 40 percent of the population in Al-Buss during earlier years, was apparently down to about 15 by 2011 though. There is apparently still a tiny number of Armenians living in the camp as well.

The most common mural in Al-Buss though is the Palestinian flag, in contrast to the flags of Amal and Hezbollah which dominate the visual-spatial landscape in Tyre. Also omnipresent in the public sphere of the camp are images of the late PLO leader Arafat and of Palestinian fighters killed in the armed resistance against the occupation as martyrs, usually combined with pictures of the Dome of the Rock in Jerusalem. Other common themes dealing with Palestinian identity are spray-painted images depicting narratives about the traumatic displacement events of the Nakba and life in the diaspora. Some feature Handala, the iconic symbol of Palestinian defiance created by cartoonist Naji al-Ali, who worked as a drawing instructor at Tyre's Jafariya School during the 1960s.

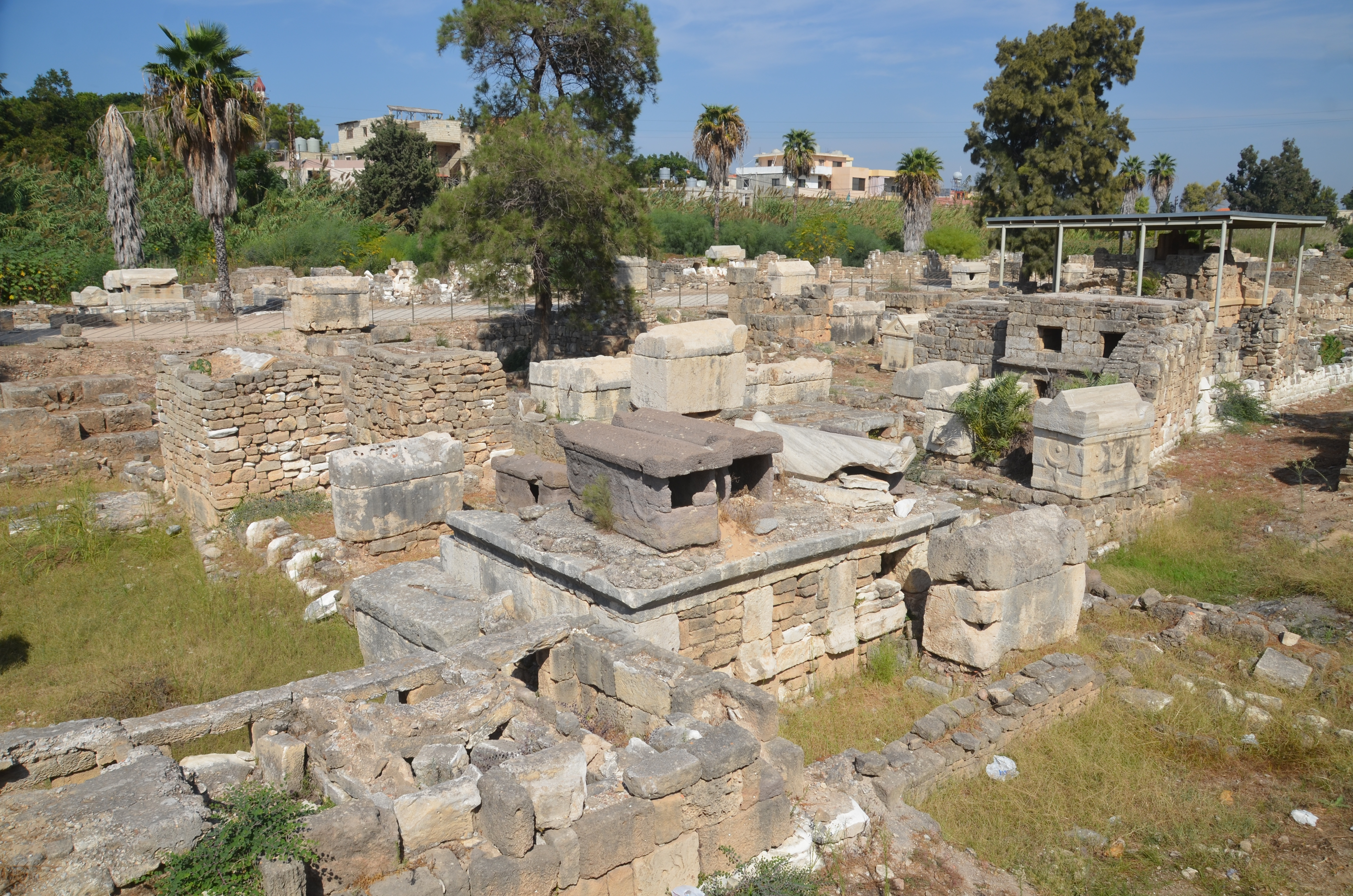
The Al-Buss necropolis in the foreground with buildings of the camp in the background

Perdigon has researched another kind of a cultural phenomenon that he describes as "fairly ordinary" amongst many Palestinians in Lebanon, especially in Al-Buss and Rashidieh, which happens to be an ancient burial site as well. This phenomenon – which is known as Al Qreene – haunts people in their dreams through different forms, interrupts their lives and is especially feared for causing miscarriages. Perdigon lays out one exemplary case from Al-Buss:

"Lamis, my 45-year-old neighbor and landlady when I was living in al-Bass, had an especially long and painful engagement with al-Qreene [..]. Lamis’s mother 'had her' (i.e., al-Qreene) when she gave birth to her. Were it not for her vigilance at the time, Lamis 'would not have lived' (gheyro ma be’ish), although the price to pay was that she 'carried' al-Qreene from her mother (ijat menha iley . . . hemelet al-Qreene). Lamis started to directly confront al-Qreene herself at the onset of her first pregnancy. She lost four unborn children over the years to the frightful entity, who burst in on the scene of her dreams alternatively as 'an ugly old woman' and a mob of militiamen. Three of those losses coincided with brutal episodes of forced displacement the household suffered during the War of Lebanon (1975–90). In the very last instance in the early 1990s, al-Qreene came (ijat) in the shape of Lamis’s very own husband, who had died a few weeks before at the age of 37 from nervous exhaustion (an account confirmed by the neighborhood consensus) upon repeatedly finding himself unable to sustain his family in the context of laws and decrees excluding Palestinians from legal employment. In this uncannily familiar appearance, al-Qreene snatched away from her one of the twins (the male) she was carrying in her womb."

== See also ==
- Armenians in Lebanon
- Palestinians in Lebanon
