= Free Sunnis of Baalbek Brigade =

Jihadist group in Lebanon

- Liwa Ahrar al-Sunnah Baalbek
- The black standard of ISIL
- Dates active: 2013–2017
- Headquarters: Baalbek, Lebanon
- Ideology: Sunni Islamism; Salafist jihadism Islamic fundamentalism
- Part of: Islamic State of Iraq and the Levant
- Wars: Syrian Civil War spillover in Lebanon

The Free Sunnis of Baalbek Brigade, also known as Liwa Ahrar al-Sunnah Baalbek, was a Sunni jihadist group active in Lebanon. It first rose to prominence in November 2013 when it retaliated against the Shia Islamist group Hezbollah, after clashes between locals Sunnis in Baalbek and members of Hezbollah. The group is known for attacking the Iranian embassy in Beirut in 2013 and attacking Christian churches. On 30 June 2014, the group pledged its allegiance to the Islamic State of Iraq and the Levant (ISIL).
