= Assassination of Rafic Hariri =

2005 political murder in Beirut, Lebanon

Assassination of Rafic Hariri اغتيال رفيق الحريري
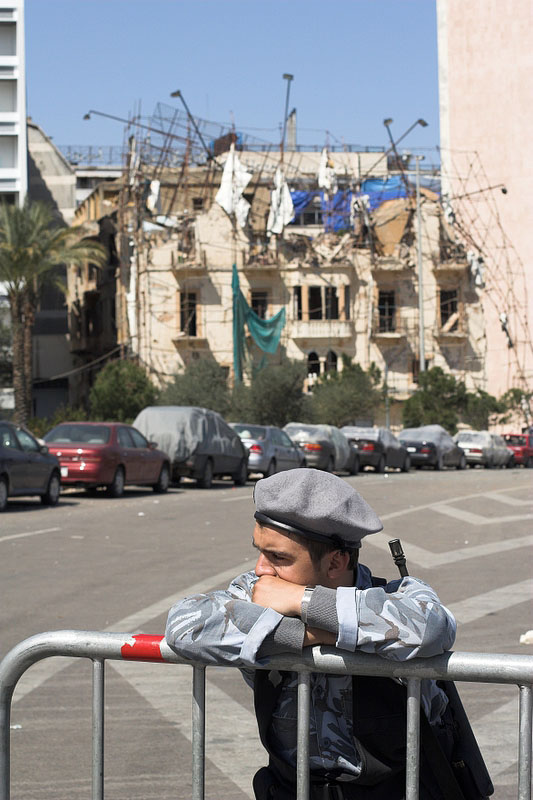
- A Lebanese Internal Security Forces officer guarding the site of the assassination

- Location: 33°54′07″N 35°29′40″E; Beirut, Lebanon
- Date: 14 February 2005; 21 years ago
- Target: Rafic Hariri
- Attack type: Truck bombing
- Weapon: Truck bomb
- Deaths: 22
- Injuries: 220
- Perpetrators: Hezbollah; Syria
- Inquiry: Special Tribunal for Lebanon
- Accused: Mustafa Badreddine (died in 2016)
- Convicted: Salim Ayyash, Hassan Habib Merhi, and Hussein Oneissi (Hezbollah operatives)

On 14 February 2005, former Prime Minister of Lebanon Rafic Hariri was assassinated along with 21 others in an explosion in Beirut, Lebanon. Explosives equivalent to around 1,000 kilograms (2,200 pounds) of TNT were detonated as his motorcade drove near the St. George Hotel. Among the dead were several of Hariri's bodyguards and former Minister of Economy and Trade Bassel Fleihan.

Hariri had been part of the anti-Assad opposition in Lebanon. His assassination triggered the Cedar Revolution, a popular movement which forced Syria to withdraw all its troops in Lebanon by April 2005. The United Nations set up the Special Tribunal for Lebanon to investigate the killing, which along with an independent investigation carried out by Lebanese Brigadier General Wissam al-Hassan, found compelling evidence that Hezbollah carried out the assassination. One of the investigators, Wissam Eid, was assassinated in 2008.

In August 2020, the Special Tribunal for Lebanon found Salim Ayyash, a mid-level operative in Hezbollah, guilty in absentia of five charges including the premeditated murder of Hariri using explosive materials. Three other defendants were acquitted. The panel of judges concluded there was "no evidence that the Hezbollah leadership had any involvement in Hariri's murder and there is no direct evidence of Syrian involvement." Hezbollah denied involvement and its leader, Hassan Nasrallah, refused to allow the arrest of Ayyash.

== Background ==
It will be Lahoud.. opposing him is tantamount to opposing Assad himself.. I will break Lebanon over your head and over Walid Jumblatt’s head. So you had better return to Beirut and arrange the matter on that basis.

— Bashar al-Assad to Rafic Hariri after summoning him to a meeting at the Presidential Palace in Damascus in August 2004

Hariri and others in the anti-Assad opposition had questioned the plan to extend the term of Lebanese President Émile Lahoud, emboldened by popular anger and civic action that became the Cedar Revolution. Lebanese Druze leader Walid Jumblatt, a newer recruit of the anti-Syrian opposition, said after the assassination that in August 2004 Syrian President Bashar al-Assad threatened Hariri personally in a meeting, saying "Lahoud represents me... If you and Chirac want me out of Lebanon, I will destroy Lebanon." His account is quoted, but not confirmed, in the UN's FitzGerald Report. The report stops short of directly accusing Damascus or any other party, saying that only a further thorough international inquest can identify the culprit.

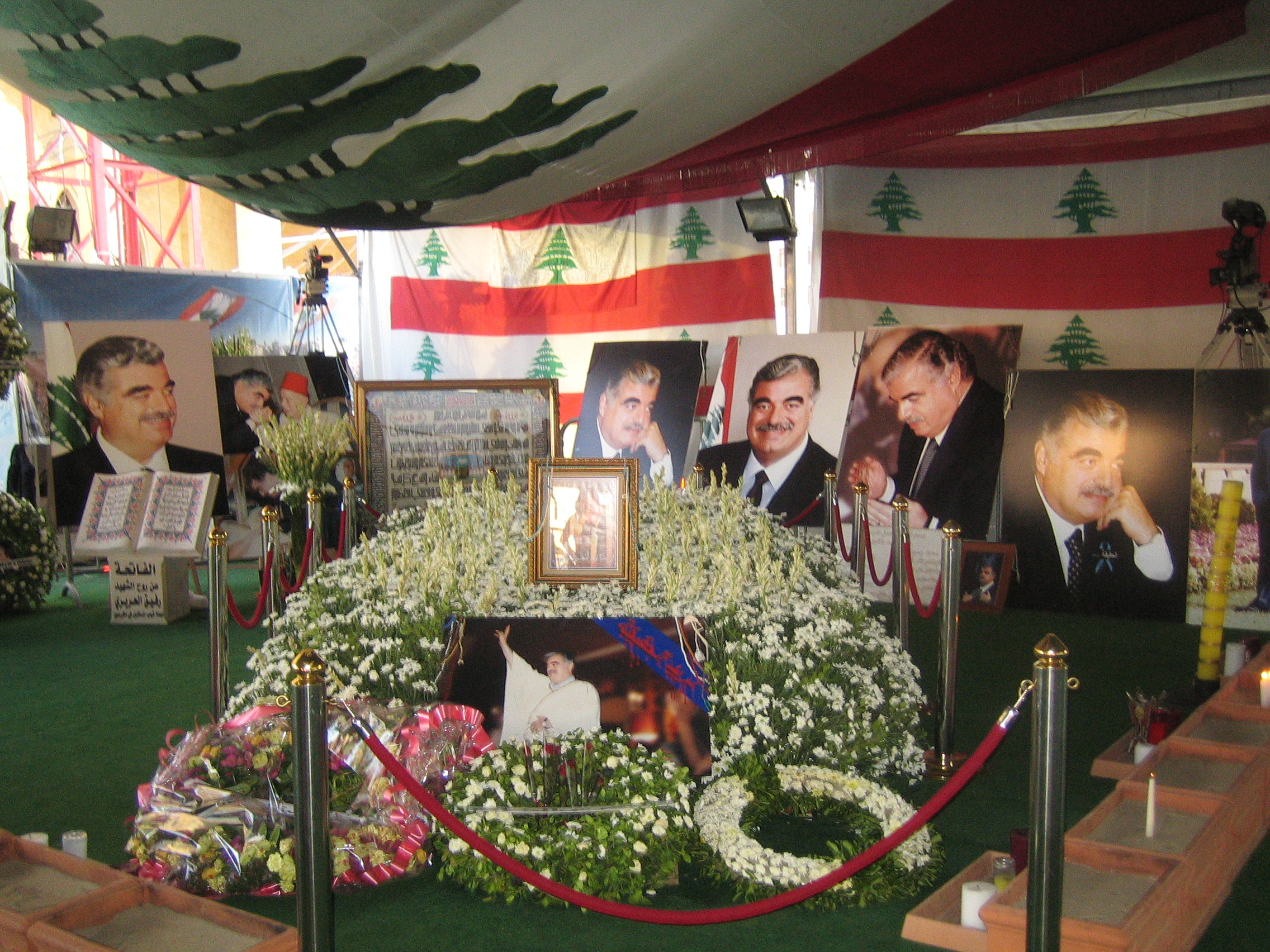
Memorial shrine to Hariri

According to these testimonies, Hariri reminded Assad of his pledge not to seek an extension for Lahoud's term, and Assad replied that there was a policy shift and that the decision was already taken. He added that Lahoud should be viewed as his personal representative in Lebanon and that "opposing him is tantamount to opposing Assad himself". He then added that he (Assad) "would rather break Lebanon over the heads of Hariri and [Druze leader] Walid Jumblatt than see his word in Lebanon broken".

According to the testimonies, Assad then threatened both longtime allies Hariri and Jumblatt with physical harm if they opposed the extension for Lahoud. The meeting reportedly lasted for ten minutes, and was the last time Hariri met with Assad. After the meeting, Hariri told his supporters that they had no other option but to support the extension for Lahoud. The mission has also received accounts of further threats made to Hariri by security officials in case he abstained from voting in favour of the extension or "even thought of leaving the country." Irish journalist Lara Marlowe also reported that Hariri told her he had been threatened by Assad.

In an interview with Der Spiegel, Assad said, "I never threatened him and no Syrian intelligence officer has ever pointed a gun to his head." On the other hand, then-Vice President Abdul Halim Khaddam who defected from the Syrian branch of the Arab Socialist Ba'ath Party due to Assad's handling of the Lebanese crisis stated in an interview to Al Arabiya that Bashar threatened Hariri with "extremely harsh words". According to Khaddam: "No Syrian security service can reach a decision independently, besides the president. Bashar told me that people in Syria were involved [in the assassination] and that means that he was involved."

On 2 September 2004, the UN adopted United Nations Security Council Resolution 1559, which called for Syria to end its 29-year occupation of Lebanon.

== Assassination ==
On the morning of 14 February, Hariri visited parliament and then the Café de l'Etoile for about twenty minutes. He left the cafe in a six-car convoy and followed a route that was kept secret until the very last minute. Six and a half minutes after leaving the cafe, as the convoy neared the St. George Hotel on the Corniche, a truck bomb exploded, destroying the convoy.

The blast left a crater thirty feet wide in the Corniche. A total of 22 people, including Hariri, were killed, and 220 more were injured. Dozens of cars were set on fire, several buildings were knocked down, and windows were blown out on many more.

Hariri was buried, along with the bodyguards who died in the bombing, in a location near Mohammad Al-Amin Mosque.

A videotape found hanging from a tree claimed responsibility for the blast by the "Nusra and Jihad Group in Greater Syria". No such group had been heard from before. A tape aired by Al Jazeera showed a bearded man, believed to be a Palestinian named Ahmad Abu Adas, claiming the attack. Adas' home was raided, but he remains missing. A 2012 UN report on the murder speculated he may have been the suicide bomber but also quotes a witness who said Adas had nothing to do with the bombing. A 2015 report by The New York Times states that DNA evidence shows Adas was not the bomber, but had been lured into making the video in order to cast blame on the Sunnis, and was then probably killed.

The UN report determined that the bomb had been placed in a white Mitsubishi Canter truck, based on CCTV footage from a nearby HSBC bank. It was likely detonated by a suicide bomber in the vehicle, which would have evaded the electronic jamming devices of Hariri's convoy. Investigators determined that the Mitsubishi truck had been stolen from Sagamihara, Japan, on 12 October 2004.

== Investigation ==
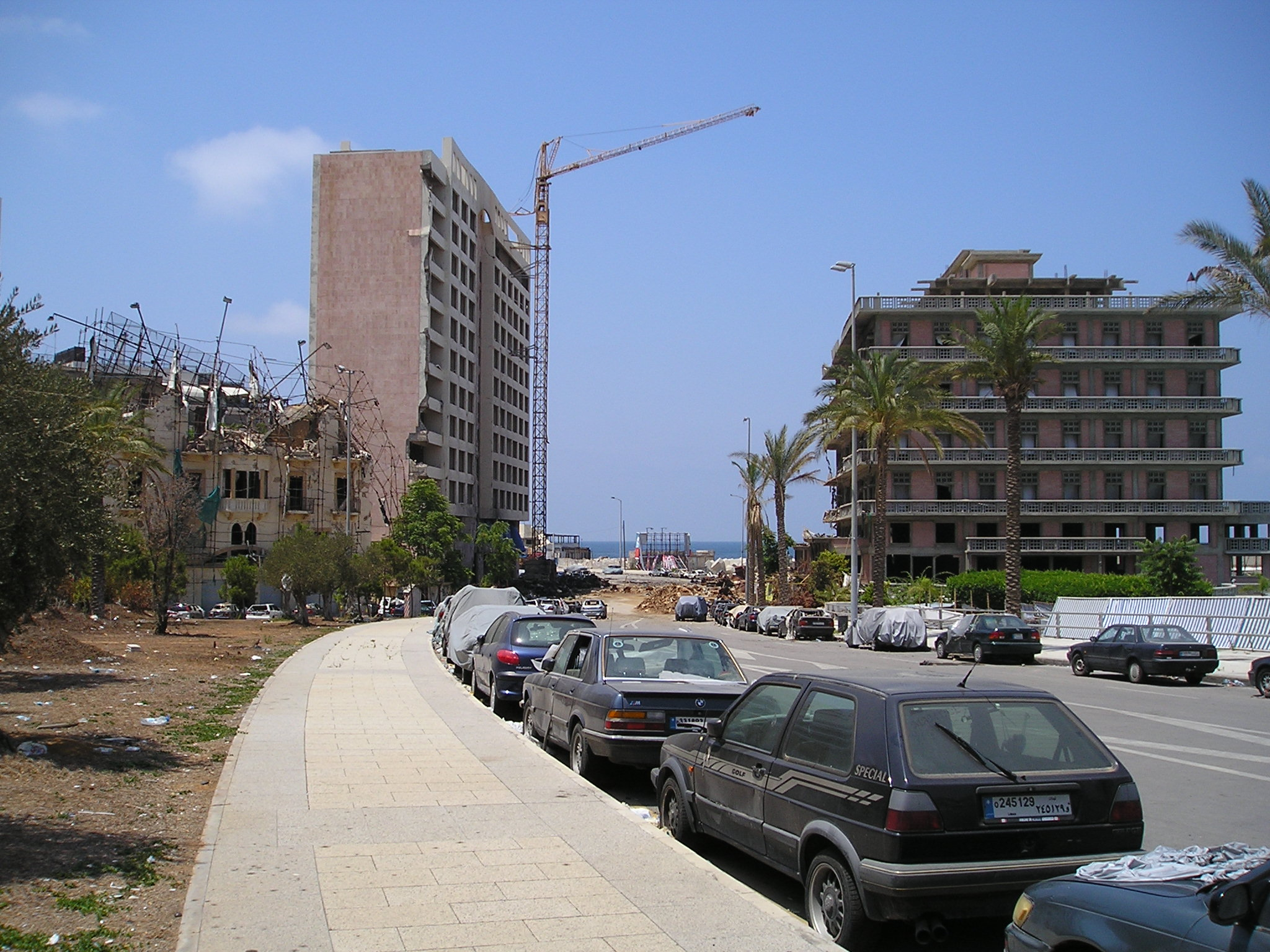
Rue Minet al Hosn where Hariri was assassinated

On 7 April 2005 the United Nations Security Council unanimously adopted Resolution 1595 to send an investigative team to look into Hariri's assassination. The team, led by German judge Detlev Mehlis, presented its initial findings in the so-called Mehlis report to the Security Council on 20 October 2005.

The report implicated Syrian and Lebanese officials, with special focus on Maher al-Assad, Assef Shawkat, Hassan Khalil, Bahjat Suleiman, and Jamil Al Sayyed. Maher al-Assad is the brother of Syrian president Bashar al-Assad, and Assef Shawqat, a powerful figure within the government, was married to their sister Bushra. Suleiman is a top Syrian security official and Jamil Al Sayyed, the only Lebanese of the four, was the head of Lebanon's General Security Department at the time of Hariri's assassination.

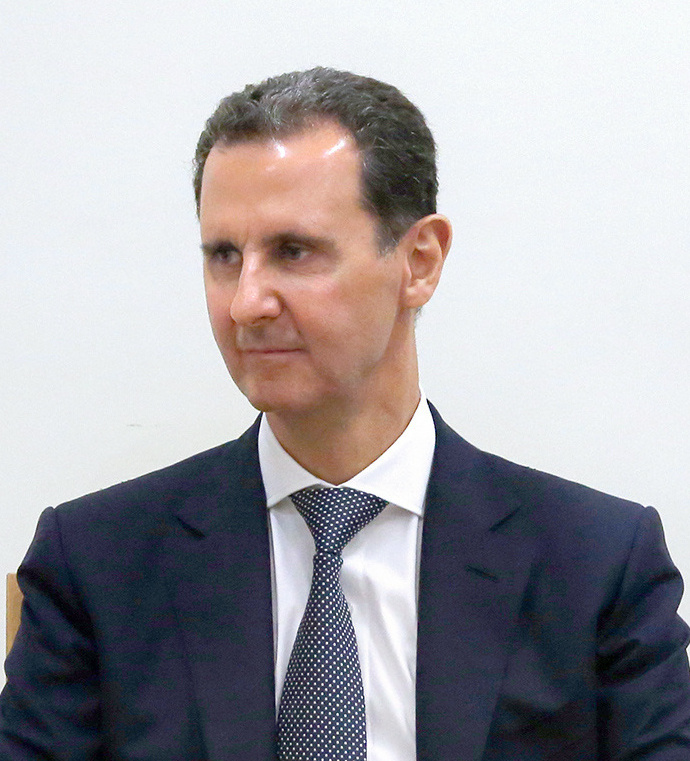
Bashar al-Assad is widely regarded to have approved the assassination. International investigations revealed direct participation of members in the highest echelons of the Syrian government.

Eyewitness testimonies of an August 2004 meeting between Assad and Hariri published in the report states:

"According to Mr. Hariri, Assad told him: "Lahoud is me. I want to renew his mandate... If Chirac wants me out of Lebanon, I will break Lebanon.".. President Assad had threatened him directly and told him, that voting against the extension would be considered as being directed against Syria. According to Mr. Hariri, President Assad added that in that case they, the Syrians, would "blow him up" and any of his family members and that they would find them anywhere in the world."

In the wake of the report, U.S. President George W. Bush called for a special meeting of the UN to be convened to discuss international response "as quickly as possible to deal with this very serious matter." Meanwhile, Detlev Mehlis asked for more time to investigate all the leads.

Lebanese politicians asked to extend the investigative team's duration and charter, to include assassinations of other prominent anti-Syrian Lebanese figures around that time, such as journalist Samir Kassir (killed by a car bomb in June 2005) and Gebran Tueni (also killed by a car bomb, in December 2005).

A second report, submitted on 10 December 2005, upheld the conclusions from the first report. On 11 January 2006, Mehlis was replaced by Belgian jurist Serge Brammertz.

The Lebanese government agreed to this inquiry, though calling for the full participation, not supremacy, of its own agencies and the respect of Lebanese sovereignty. The UN Security Council voted unanimously to demand full Syrian cooperation with UN investigators in the matter, and Brammertz's last two reports praised Syria's full co-operation.

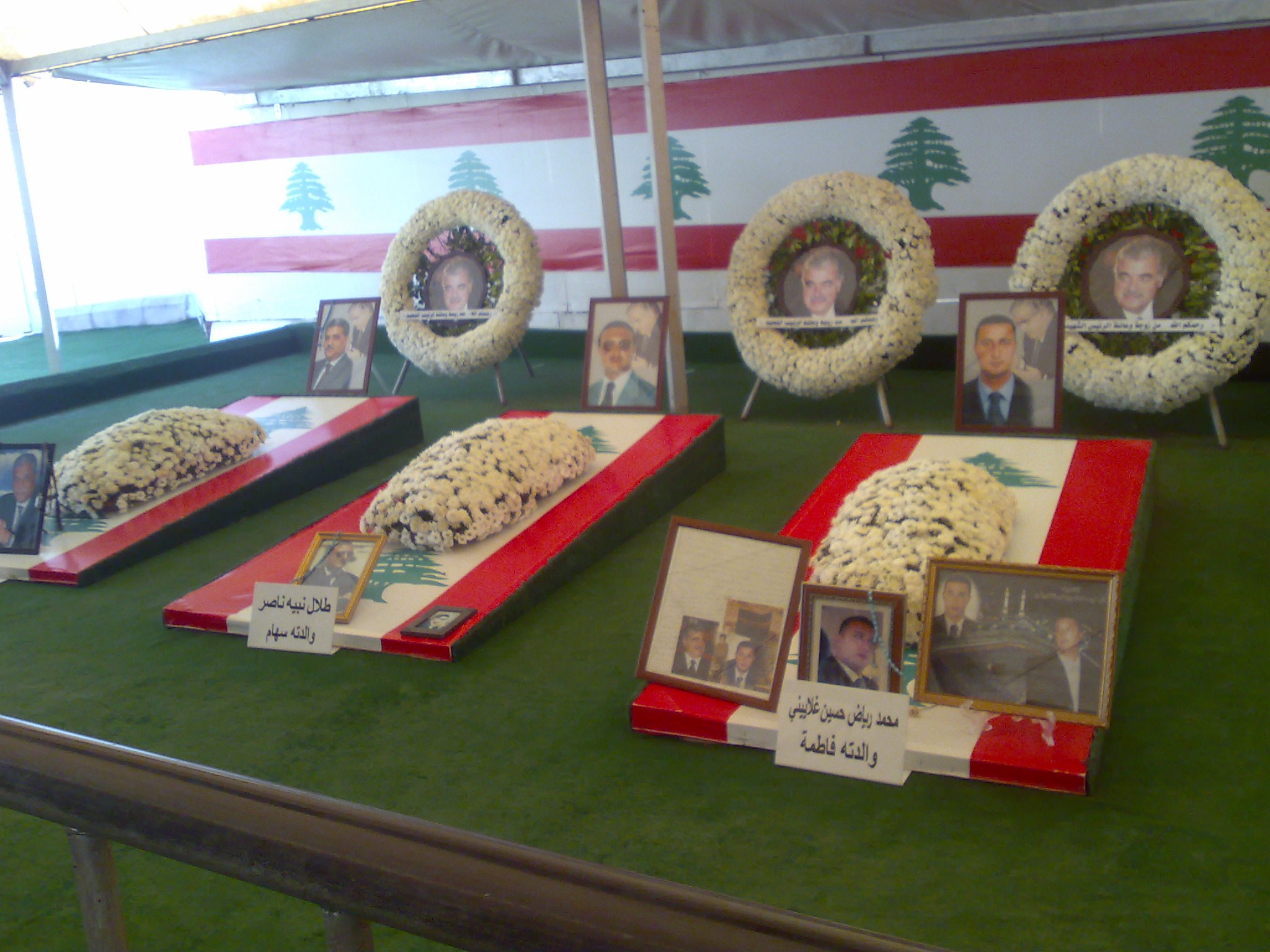
Some of Hariri's bodyguards' shrines

On 30 August 2005, four pro-Syrian Lebanese generals (some of whom had promoted the false Abu Addas theory) were subsequently arrested under suspicion of conspiracy to commit murder. They were detained without charge by Lebanese authorities for four years and released by the STL when it took over the investigation in 2009. Mustafa Hamdan, former head of the Lebanese Presidential Guard brigade; Jamil Al Sayyed, former director-general of Security General; Ali Al Hajj, director general of the Lebanese Internal Security Forces; and Raymond Azar, the former director of the Military Intelligence were released upon an order from the STL pre-trial judge at the request of the prosecutor due to lack of evidence. In making the request, the prosecutor had considered "inconsistencies in the statements of key witnesses and of a lack of corroborative evidence to support these statements."

Syrian Minister of Interior Ghazi Kanaan was interviewed in September 2005 by Detlev Mehlis' team as a "witness" in the assassination. Kanaan denied any involvement in the assassination. On 12 October Kanaan was found dead with a gunshot wound to the head in his Damascus office." The Syrian government said it was a suicide, though others claimed it was murder to sever the link between Hariri's death and the regime.

On 30 December 2005, former Syrian Vice President Abdul Halim Khaddam in a televised interview implicated Assad in the assassination and said that Assad personally threatened Hariri in the months before his death. This interview has caused Syrian MPs to demand treason charges against Khaddam.

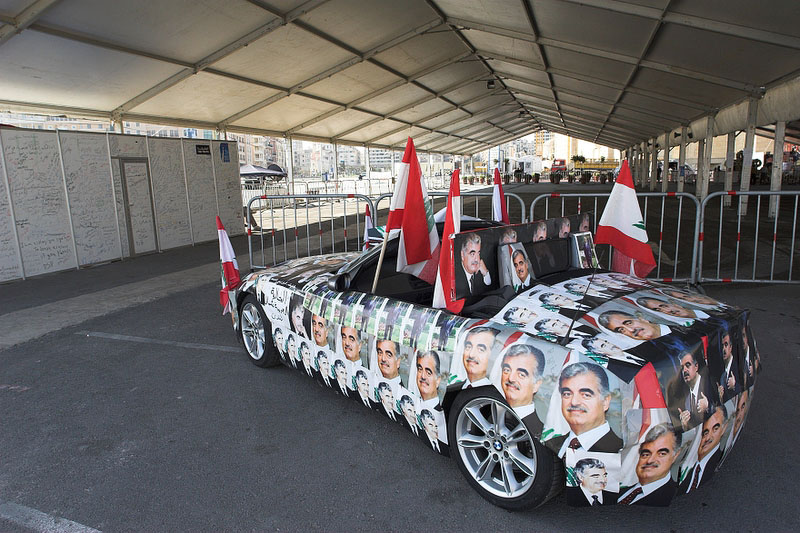
A BMW with portraits of the late Prime Minister Hariri on March 26, 2005, shortly over month following his assassination

On 18 December 2006, a progress report by former head of the investigation, Serge Brammertz, indicated that DNA evidence suggested that the assassination might be the act of a young male suicide bomber.

On 28 March 2008, the tenth report of the UN's International Independent Investigation Commission found that, "a network of individuals acted in concert to carry out the assassination of Rafic Hariri and that this criminal network – the 'Hariri Network' – or parts thereof are linked to some of the other cases within the commission's mandate."

The Security Council extended the mandate for the investigation, which was to end in December 2008, until 28 February 2009.

On 7 February 2012, Hürriyet reported investigators from the United Nations interviewed Louai Sakka, interested in whether he had played a role in the assassination.

== UN Special Tribunal ==
The Lebanese government and the UN agreed to establish a Special Tribunal for Lebanon in 2007, signing the agreement on 23 January 2007 and 6 February 2007 respectively. When the agreement was sent to the Lebanese Parliament for ratification, however, the Speaker refused to convene Parliament to vote on it. Upon request from a majority of members of the Lebanese parliament and the Prime Minister, the United Nations Security Council adopted Resolution 1757, implementing the agreement.

For reasons of security, administrative efficiency and fairness, the tribunal has its seat outside Lebanon, in Leidschendam, on the outskirts of The Hague, the Netherlands. The premises of the tribunal is the former headquarters of the Dutch General Intelligence and Security Service (Algemene Inlichtingen- en Veiligheidsdienst, or AIVD). The Netherlands originally agreed to host the tribunal on 21 December 2007. The court opened on 1 March 2009.

The tribunal is the first international court to prosecute terrorism as a distinct crime.

On 29 April 2009, following a request of Prosecutor Daniel Bellemare, the pre-trial judge determined that the four suspects arrested during the investigation could not be considered "as either suspects or accused persons in the proceedings pending before the Tribunal" and ordered their unconditional release. The detained persons were General Jamil Al Sayyed (head of General Security), General Ali Al Hajj (chief of the Internal Security Forces), Brigadier-General Raymond Azar (head of Army Intelligence), and Brigadier-General Mustafa Hamdan (head of the presidential guard). Considered as Syria's main rule-enforcing agents at the time, they spent nearly 3 years and 8 months in detention after Lebanese authorities arrested them on 1 September 2005, and during that period no charges were ever pressed against them. Their release came amidst a tense political atmosphere in Lebanon, due to the officially admitted heavy politicisation of the affair. Several anti-Syrian political figures have stated that "[we] still consider them as guilty."

On 30 June 2011, Haaretz reported that the Tribunal had submitted to Lebanon's Prosecutor General indictments of four Lebanese Hezbollah members, and a foreigner. The indictments were served by representatives of the International Court of Justice at The Hague.

One of the Special Tribunal's leading figures was Lebanese Brigadier General Wissam al-Hassan. On 19 October 2012, al-Hassan was assassinated in a car explosion in the Achrafieh district of Beirut.

Prosecutor v. Ayyash et al. began on 16 January 2014 with an opening statement from the prosecution. Salim Jamil Ayyash, Hassan Habib Merhi, Hussein Hassan Oneissi, and Assad Hassan Sabra, members of Hezbollah's assassination Unit 121, were on trial in absentia, as it was determined they had absconded to avoid standing trial.

On 18 August 2020, the Special Tribunal for Lebanon found Salim Ayyash, a senior operative in Hezbollah, guilty in absentia of five charges including the intentional murder of Hariri with premeditation by using explosive materials. Three other defendants were acquitted. The panel of judges concluded there was "no evidence that the Hezbollah leadership had any involvement in Hariri's murder and there is no direct evidence of Syrian involvement". Hezbollah denied any involvement and its leader, Hassan Nasrallah, refused to allow the arrest of Ayyash. This was in spite of the fact that already by 2015 the tribunal (based on earlier work by Lebanese police captain Wissam Eid, who was assassinated in 2008) had uncovered five groups of cellphones involving scores of operatives. The only operatives whom the tribunal was able to identify were Ayyash (the leader of Hezbollah's Jaber Force unit), Merhi (commander of Hezbollah's special forces in Lebanon), Oneissi (according to the prosecutors the man who lured Adas into making the fake claim of responsibility), Sabra, and Mustafa Badreddine, a military leader of Hezbollah who was assassinated in 2016. In 2022, Hassan Habib Merhi and Hussein Oneissi, two Hezbollah members, were also convicted by the Special Tribunal for Lebanon for their roles in the assassination. Ayyash, Merhi, and Oneissi were each sentenced to life in prison.

In March 2021, the United States offered a $10 million reward for providing information about Salim Ayyash, leader of Unit 121 and fugitive Hezbollah suspect convicted over Hariri's assassination. Ayyash was said to have been killed in an Israeli airstrike in November 2024 in Syria.

== Hezbollah ==
In August 2010, in response to notification that the UN tribunal would indict some Hezbollah members, the Secretary-General of Hezbollah Hassan Nasrallah said Israel was looking for a way to assassinate Hariri as early as 1993 in order to create political chaos that would force Syria to withdraw from Lebanon, and to perpetuate an anti-Syrian atmosphere in Lebanon in the wake of the assassination. He went on to say that in 1996 Hezbollah apprehended an agent working for Israel by the name of Ahmed Nasrallah – no relation to Hassan Nasrallah – who allegedly contacted Hariri's security detail and told them that he had solid proof that Hezbollah was planning to take his life. Hariri then contacted Hezbollah and advised them of the situation. Saad Hariri (Rafic Hariri's son, who has also served as PM of Lebanon) responded that the UN should investigate these claims.

== Aftermath ==
Hariri was a close friend of French President Jacques Chirac. Few felt he was a threat, due to his ties with the EU and the West. Chirac was one of the first foreign dignitaries to offer condolences to Hariri's widow in person at her home in Beirut. The Special Tribunal for Lebanon was also created at his instigation.

Following Hariri's death, there were several other bombings and assassinations against anti-Syrian figures. These included Samir Kassir, George Hawi, Gebran Tueni, Pierre Amine Gemayel, and Walid Eido. Assassination attempts were made on Elias Murr, May Chidiac, and Samir Shehade (who was investigating Hariri's death).

== See also ==
- List of extrajudicial killings and political violence in Lebanon
- Mustafa Badreddine

== Bibliography ==
- Jürgen Cain Külbel: Mordakte Hariri: Unterdrückte Spuren im Libanon, 2006, ISBN 3-89706-860-5
- Jürgen Cain Külbel: Ietail Al-Hariri. Adellah Machfiyyah, 2006, ISBN 3-89706-973-3
- Nicholas Blanford: Killing Mr. Lebanon: The Assassination of Rafiq Hariri and Its Impact On the Middle East, 2006, ISBN 1-84511-202-4
