= Timeline of violent events relating to the Syrian civil war spillover in Lebanon (2011–2014) =

From its inception, the Syrian Civil War has produced and inspired a great deal of strife and unrest in the nation of Lebanon. Prior to the Battle of Arsal in August 2014, the Lebanese Army has tried to keep out of it and the violence has been mostly between various factions within the country and overt Syrian involvement has been limited to airstrikes and occasional accidental incursions.

== Early incidents ==
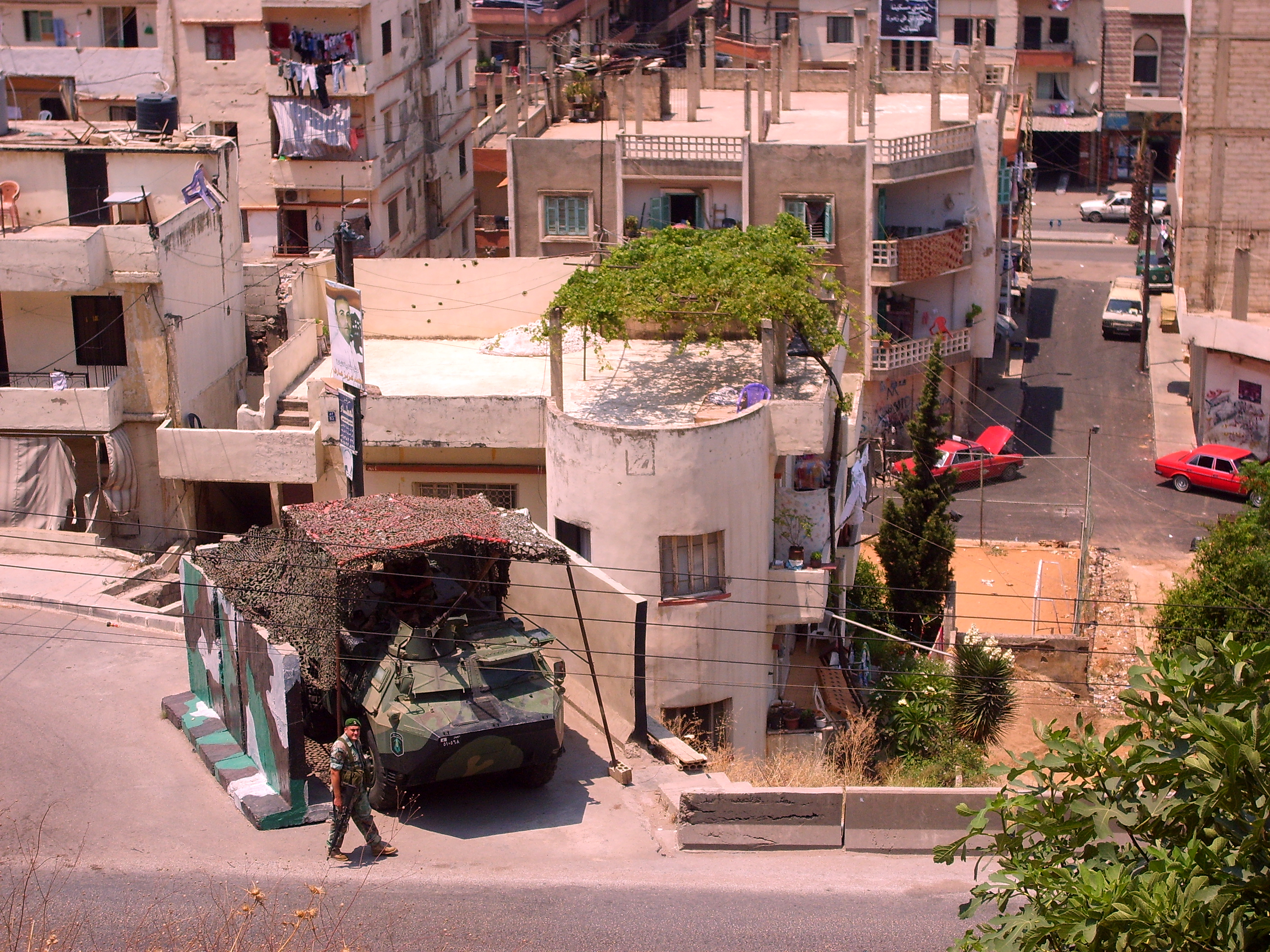
Lebanese army personnel on Syria Street maintaining the border division between the Sunni-predominant Bab al-Tabbaneh district and the Alawite-predominant Jabal Mohsen district in 2011

In interfactional clashes in Tripoli between Sunnis and Alawites, seven people were killed and 59 wounded, on 17 June 2011. Clashes erupted following a rally in support of Syrian protesters. Fighting broke out between gunmen positioned in the rival neighborhoods of Jabal Mohsen (mainly Alawites who support the Syrian government) and Bab al-Tabbaneh (mainly Sunnis, supporting the Syrian uprising). Among the dead were a Lebanese army soldier and an official from the Alawite Arab Democratic Party.

From 10 to 11 February 2012, two or three people died in fighting in Tripoli's neighborhoods of Jabal Mohsen and Bab al-Tebbaneh. An intervention by the Lebanese Army resulted in the injury of six soldiers.

On 29 April 2012, the Lebanese navy confiscated a large consignment of arms and ammunition on the container ship "Lutfallah II," which was headed for the port of Tripoli in northern Lebanon before it was intercepted. The ship had begun its voyage from Libya and it is generally believed the consignment was destined for the rebels in Syria. Four people were also wounded during a clash between supporters of the Syrian opposition and Sunni supporters of Assad from the Tawheed Movement.

== May 2012 Bab al-Tabbaneh–Jabal Mohsen clashes ==
In May 2012, Salafists demanded the release of a Sunni Islamist, Shadi Mawlawi, who had been arrested on charges of belonging to a terrorist organization.

The arrest of Mawlawi triggered a new round of fighting between Islamists and Alawites in Tripoli. Two to four people were killed when fighting erupted on the night of 12 May 2012. In the evening of 12 May, rocket-propelled grenades were used in an Alawite enclave and surrounding Sunni neighbourhoods in the port city. Hours before the clashes, Lebanese troops exchanged fire with a group of Islamists protesting in Tripoli for the release of a terrorism suspect. The Islamists tried to approach the offices of the pro-Syrian Syrian Social Nationalist Party. In all, three of the dead were reportedly Sunni civilians, while one was an army officer.

The fighting continued on 14 May, which resulted in the death of five Alawites and one Sunni. The army then deployed to the area on 15 May, and engaged in gunbattles with residents that left eight wounded, including a soldier. By 16 May, the clashes left 11 dead, including a soldier.

By 18 May, a total of 12 people were dead and more than 100 wounded in the clashes.

== Killing of Ahmad Abdel-Wahid ==
On 20 May 2012, a prominent Lebanese Sunni cleric, Ahmad Abdel-Wahid, and his aide, Mohammed Merheb, were killed by the Lebanese Army, when failing to stop at a check point in Akkar. His death provoked protesters into cutting off roads in many parts of the country with burning tires.

The following day, 22 army personnel present at the shooting were arrested. On 22 May, the Islamist Shadi Mawlawi was released in Tripoli.

On 24 May, the Islamist protesters in Tripoli threatened that their demonstrations would spread all over Lebanon if about 180 Islamists arrested and accused of participating in the 2007 Lebanon conflict were not released.

== Beirut clashes ==
On 20 May 2012, the evening following the killing of Sheikh Abdel-Wahid, clashes erupted in Beirut's Tariq Jdideh neighborhood between armed Sunni militants of the Future Movement and Sunnis of the Arab Movement Party, leaving three dead and ten wounded and creating a tense security situation in the capital and the country as a whole.

On 6 September 2012, two people were wounded in gunfights between Future Movement members in Beirut, and the army was deployed in the area.

== Kidnappings ==
In May 2012, Syrian opposition members kidnapped three pro-Syrian government Lebanese in the village of Zeita near the Syrian border. In retaliation, 60 Syrian workers were kidnapped. The prisoners were exchanged on 16 May.

On 22 May, at least 16 Lebanese Shia pilgrims were reportedly kidnapped by the Free Syrian Army in Aleppo. The FSA denied responsibility and blamed them on what they termed "mafia gangs" and stated that they would help free the pilgrims. The kidnappers said they would release the pilgrims if Lebanon recognised the Syrian opposition. Of 11 hostages being held, one was released on 25 August.

In late May, two Lebanese farmers were kidnapped and transported to Syria by pro-Syrian government forces. Rifaat Eid of the Arab Democratic Party mediated for their release, which occurred on 3 June.

Several people were kidnapped, in response to other kidnappings, in June. On 25 August, a Kuwaiti citizen was kidnapped in Howsh al-Ghanam in the Bekaa valley. However, the political nature of the kidnapping was questioned by the security services.

The Shia al-Meqdad clan abducted a group of 20 people, mainly alleged FSA members but also a Turk, in retaliation for the kidnapping of Hassan al-Meqdad on 13 August 2012 by the FSA. The armed branch of the clan threatened more actions if he was not released. Several others who were kidnapped earlier were released as they were not affiliated with the FSA. As a result of the kidnappings and warnings, Saudi Arabia, Qatar, Turkey and other Gulf Arab countries warned its citizens to leave Lebanon. Hezbollah's Nasrallah said the situation was out of control and, in turn, prompted criticism of Hezbollah by 14 March.

== June–July Tripoli clashes ==
On 30 May 2012, two people were wounded in clashes between the Bab al-Tabbaneh and Jabal Mohsen neighborhoods.

On 2–3 June, 15 people were killed and over 60 wounded in clashes around Tripoli. As a result of the fighting, the Army re-entered Syria Street, that divides the warring neighborhoods. Following the declaration of a cease-fire, during the night of 3 June, one policeman and one soldier were wounded.

On 8 June, one person was killed and three others were wounded when gunfire hit the Alawite neighborhood in Tripoli.

On 25 June, there were clashes between families supporting different political factions in Miniyeh, North Lebanon.

On 18 July, one was killed and several were wounded during anti-Syrian celebrations in Tripoli, following the bombing of several Syrian ministers.

On 27 July, two men who were on their way home to Jabal Mohsen were stabbed, which lead to clashes.

== Clashes near Lebanese–Syrian Border ==
At the beginning of the summer 2012, two Hezbollah fighters were killed in a clash with Syrian rebels who were on Lebanese territory.

On 17 September, Syrian Ground-attack aircraft fired missiles 500 metres (1,600 ft) into Lebanese territory near Arsal. It was suggested that the jets were chasing rebels in the vicinity. The attack prompted president Michel Sleiman to launch an investigation.

On 22 September, members of the Free Syrian Army attacked a border post near Arsal. This was reported to be the second incursion within a week. The group were chased off into the hills by the Lebanese Army, who detained and later released some rebels due to pressure from dignified locals. Michel Sleiman praised the actions taken by the military as maintaining Lebanon's neutral position. Syria has repeatedly called for an intensified crackdown on rebels that it claims are hiding in Lebanese border towns.

On 11 October 2012, shells fired by the Syrian military hit Masharih al-Qaa, where previous shelling incidents have caused fatalities. Lebanon's position of ignoring the attacks remained unchanged.

In October Hassan Nasrallah denied Hezbollah was fighting alongside the Syrian army, but that Lebanese in Syria were only protecting Lebanese inhabited villages from the Free Syrian Army.

== June 2012 refugee camp clashes ==
On 16 June 2012, a Palestinian man was killed and eight others were wounded in clashes with the Lebanese Army in Nahr al-Bared refugee camp. On 18 June, two Palestinians were killed and 10 more wounded in the camp and one Palestinian was killed in Ain al-Hilweh camp while protesting by the Lebanese Army. On 27 June, clashes erupted in the Bourj al-Barajneh camp, with no casualties.

== Ahmed al-Assir sit in ==
The Sunni cleric Sheikh Ahmed Al-Assir and his supporters staged a sit in in Sidon to protest Hezbollah's weapons. This led to clashes between Assir-supporters and members of the Popular Nasserist Organization. An AFP photographer was beaten during the clash. The following day, counter-protests were held.

On 8 August 2012, a gunfight between supporters and rivals of Assir wounded five, including two women.

== Michel Samaha arrest ==
On 9 August 2012, Lebanese police arrested former minister Michel Samaha, who was later indicted for inciting sectarian strife through "terrorist attacks" on behalf of the Syrian government. The court also indicted two Syrian army officials, the head of Syrian National Security Bureau Ali Mamlouk and Brigadier General Adnan. Reportedly, Samaha confessed to planning on carrying out several bombings in northern Lebanon. The March 14 alliance called for a rapid investigation and, if confirmed, an immediate cutting of relations with Syria. The ruling March 8 alliance meanwhile dismissed Samaha's arrest as a "March 14 campaign".

== August Tripoli clashes ==
On 9 August 2012, Sunni supporters of Hezbollah from the Tawheed Movement clashed with Salafists in Tripoli.

On 20 and 21 August 12 people were killed and more than 100 wounded, including 15 soldiers, in clashes between Sunni Muslims and Alawites in Tripoli, according to security and medical sources. At least two of the dead were from Jabal Mohsen and five were from Bab al-Tabbaneh. Five of the soldiers were injured by gunfire, and another five after a grenade was lobbed at an army checkpoint.

On 22 August, the Lebanese Army deployed troops into the feuding neighborhoods. However, the army sustained heavy casualties, and was forced to retreat. After opening a dialogue with community leaders, the army managed to forge a ceasefire between the two parties.

The ceasefire dissolved on 23 August, as fresh clashes erupted across the city. The Lebanese Army has deployed tanks to the neighbourhoods.

On 24 August, further fighting occurred between Sunni and Alawite fighters in the Qobbah and Jabal Muhsin neighbourhoods. At least 7 Alawite-owned shops in Sunni neighborhoods were torched. Fighting escalated after the death of Sunni cleric Khaled al Baradei, shot by a sniper during the morning skirmishes. Sheikh Baradei was reportedly a commander of the Sunni Islamist fighters. Two journalists were also wounded during the day's fighting.

== Wissam al-Hassan assassination ==
On 19 October 2012, a car bomb killed eight people in Achrafiyeh, including Wissam al-Hassan, chief of the Intelligence Bureau of the Internal Security Forces. 78 others were wounded in the bombing. It was the largest attack in the capital since 2008. There was speculation that Syria, or its allies, were behind the attack. Al-Hassan had also led the investigation that implicated Syria and its ally Hezbollah in the killing of Rafik al-Hariri. However, al-Hassan himself had also been a prime suspect during the Hariri investigation, and had close ties with Saudi intelligence, and was said to have ties to Mossad.

The assassination triggered violent unrest throughout the country. A host of Future TV called on a crowd to head toward the Grand Serail, and the protesters subsequently clashed with the police. Sunni gunmen set up checkpoints, scrutinising the sectarian identify of passers by.

Following Wissam al-Hassan's death, Saad Hariri directly accused the Syrians of being behind the attack, while the Future Movement called on Prime Minister Najib Mikati to immediately resign. Sheikh Abdul Razzaq al-Asmar of the Islamic Unification Movement was killed in Tripoli the same day, when pro-Hariri gunmen took control of Tripoli and clashed with IUM and SSNP members.

On 21 October, violent clashes occurred throughout the country. Two young girls and a man were killed during clashes between Bab Tabbaneh and Jabal Mohsen. The following night, pro-Hariri gunmen clashed with rivals in the Tariq al-Jadeedah neighbourhood of Beirut. Two Sunnis and an Alawite were killed in Tripoli and 15 people were wounded on 22 October. In total, clashes from 19 to 23 October left 10 dead and 65 wounded.

On 24 October, Future Movement protesters clashed with the Lebanese army.

== Sidon clash ==
On 11 November 2012, three people were killed and four others wounded after supporters of Salafi cleric Ahmed al-Assir clashed with supporters of Hezbollah in the southern city of Sidon. Assir stated "We have a blood score to settle with Hizbullah that can only be settled with blood", and that he considered forming an "armed resistance group."

== Tall Kalakh incident ==
On 30 November 2012, between 14 and 20 Islamists from North Lebanon, as well a Palestinian, were killed in an ambush in Tall Kalakh near the Lebanese border. They had gone to Syria to fight alongside the Syrian rebels.

On 2 December, Lebanese soldiers clashed with Syrian rebels near the Syrian border.

== Renewed violence in Tripoli ==
December 2012 VOA report on the conflict in Tripoli

At least 12 people were killed and 73 injured in Tripoli between 4 and 6 December 2012, in heavy clashes, which were sparked by the Tall Kalakh incident.

== Second Sidon clash ==
On 3 January 2013, one person was killed and three hurt during clashes between the Popular Nasserite Organization and the Hezbollah-affiliated Resistance Brigades. The following day, the body of a Palestinian man was found in Sidon by the army.

== Faisal Karami convoy attack ==
On 18 January 2013, Minister Faisal Karami's convoy came under attack in Tripoli by protesters holding a sit-in which demanded the release of Islamists jailed for being members of the terrorist group Fatah al Islam. Five were injured.

== Arsal clash ==
On 1 February 2013, Lebanese soldiers clashed with Salafist militants in the village of Arsal near the Syrian border, when the army attempted to arrest a fundamentalist there. Two soldiers were killed and eight wounded. Subsequently, the fundamentalists brought the 2 dead bodies to the town square and celebrated.

== Continued Tripoli violence ==
At least one person was killed and four injured when clashes broke out in Tripoli on 20 March 2013. The injured include a Lebanese soldier and his brother, both of them from the Jabal Mohseh neighborhood. Further clashes left one dead and one injured, as gunmen exchanged fire with rocket-propelled grenades. The Lebanese Army was deployed to Syria Street and managed to rescue six Alawites who were kidnapped.

On 19 and 20 May 2013, two civilians and two army soldiers were killed. By 22 May, 12 people had been killed since renewed fighting began. The Lebanese army pulled out of the city on 23 May, after being targeted. Six more were killed the following night, as mortars were used for the first time. 31 were killed by 26 May. Six more were killed by 4 May within 24 hours. Jabal Mohsen was subsequently raided by the army, which ADP leader Rifa'at Eid questioned, since similar raids were not done against Bab al-Tabbaneh.

== Rocket attacks on Beirut and Hermel ==
May 2013 VOA report about the spillover

On 26 May 2013, two rockets hit an area of southern Beirut dominated by Hezbollah, injuring five people whilst another two rockets caused property damage to buildings in the city of Hermel. Syrian rebels have been blamed for the attack as they had promised to attack Hezbollah in retaliation for its involvement in Al-Qusayr.

== Second Arsal attack ==
Gunmen attacked Lebanese soldiers at a military checkpoint in the Bekaa Valley, two soldiers were killed with a third dying in hospital. The gunmen then escaped across the border back into Syria. Three suspects, a Syrian and two Lebanese, were subsequently arrested.

== Baalbek incidents ==
Over a dozen rockets and mortars were fired from Syria into the Baalbek region which is a Hezbollah stronghold. Rebels are suspected due to their being fired from rebel controlled areas.

At least 12 Syrian rebels were reported to be killed in Ain al-Jawzeh in an ambush by Hezbollah on 2 June 2013.

Three Syrian nationals were kidnapped in the Baalbek town of Sireen on 4 June 2013.

== Clashes in central Tripoli ==
On 6 June 2013, members of the Syrian Social Nationalist Party clashed with Salafists in Tripoli, which left one dead and seven wounded.

On 9 June rockets and shells were fired from the Syrian side of the border hitting several buildings in the Akkar area of Lebanon. Gunfire hit the Abboudieh-Menjez highway. The Lebanese Army intensified its presence on Syria street, as fighting continued in central Tripoli, and nine people having been killed since the last week.

== Clash near the Iranian embassy ==
On 9 June 2013, one person was killed and 11 wounded after pro-Hezbollah gunmen opened fire on anti-Hezbollah protesters from the Lebanese Option Gathering. Lebanese security officials named the dead man as Hashem Salman of the Lebanese Option Gathering, a Shia political organisation that opposes Hezbollah.

== Arsal incidents ==
On 12 June 2013, a Syrian army helicopter has been reported as firing rockets at the town of Arsal, wounding a number of people.

On 16 June, four Shiite men from nearby villages were killed while driving by Arsal. Two of the dead were members of the Jaafar clan.

The Baalbeck International Festival has been forced to change its location due to fighting in Syria. During June 2013 alone 18 rockets and mortars has struck the town of Baalbeck.

== Battle of Sidon ==
In early June 2013, clashes broke out in a suburb of Sidon between forces loyal to the Hezbollah critic Sheik Ahmad Al-Assir and other forces. Lebanese army troops deployed in the area of the fighting.

On 23 June 2013, heavy fighting erupted between the Lebanese Army and gunmen loyal to Al-Assir. The army came under fire in the Ain el-Hilweh camp.

The next day, the Lebanese army has launched a crackdown on the pro-Assir militia in Sidon. At least four armored personnel carriers and several army vehicles were destroyed. Lebanese Army commandos seized a complex controlled by gunmen loyal to Sheikh Assir. Assir reportedly fled the complex shortly after the Army stormed the premises which the military gradually gained control over throughout the day. Ahmed al-Assir was still at large with the Army having orders to capture or kill him after he was accused of killing soldiers in "cold blood". 62 of his followers were arrested.

Overall, at least 50 people died during the fighting. 17–18 soldiers, 25–40 militants and four Hezbollah fighters were killed. Two civilians were killed, including a bodyguard of a cleric. 100–128 Lebanese soldiers, 60 pro-Assir militants, over 50 civilians and 15 Hezbollah fighters were wounded.

== July 2013 Beirut bombing ==
On 9 July 2013, a car bomb exploded in a Hezbollah stronghold suburb in south Beirut, injuring 53 people. The attack, on the first day of Ramadan, was seen as sectarian spillover from Syria between Sunni Muslims and Shia Muslims. Before this attack, on 28 June 2013, a double roadside bomb detonated in Zahlé, Beqaa Governorate, the blasts targeted a Hezbollah convoy in Zahle on this day. There were no reported casualties and minimal damages resulting from the attack. The 313 Brigade claimed responsibility for the attack. This attacks were claimed by the 313 Brigade claimed, stating the Hezbollah-controlled area was targeted for their support of Bashar al Assad in the Syrian Civil War.

== Attack on Hezbollah convoy ==
On 16 July 2013, a convoy of Hezbollah was targeted near the Syrian border with bombing. The attack resulted in one Hezbollah member killed and three wounded. An al-Qaeda linked group took responsibility.

== South Beirut terror plot ==
In July 2013, a Syrian rebel al-Qaeda-affiliated organization's terror plot, which included the use up to 7 tonnes of explosives targeting Hezbollah-dominated southern Beirut suburbs, as well as suicide bomber attacks, was averted after detailed intelligence warnings from America's CIA were passed onto Lebanese security officials.

== August 2013 Beirut bombing ==
On 15 August 2013, a car bomb exploded in Beirut, Lebanon killing twenty seven people and injuring over two-hundred people. The Islamist group Aisha Umm-al Mouemeneen, also known as Brigades of Aisha, were responsible for the explosion. The car bomb was intended for the stronghold of Hezbollah.

== August 2013 Tripoli bombing ==
On 23 August 2013, twin bombings in Tripoli, Lebanon caused extensive damage with some 47 people killed and more than 500 wounded according to Lebanon's state-run National News Agency.

== November 2013 Arsal air attack ==
On 14 November 2013, two Syrian Army helicopters crossed the border into Lebanon and fired a total of nine rockets in an attack on the residential suburbs of Arsal.

== 2013 Iranian embassy bombing ==
On 19 November 2013, twin suicide bombings detonated in front of the Iranian embassy in Beirut, Lebanon killing at least 23, and injuring more than 160. An al-Qaeda affiliate named the Abdullah Azzam Brigades claimed responsibility for the attack.

== December 2013 Assassination of Hassan al-Laqqis ==
On 4 December 2013, senior military commander of Hezbollah Hassan al-Laqqis was assassinated in Southern Beirut after gunmen shot at him with small caliber pistols equipped with silencers. A Lebanese Sunni rebel group calling themselves "Brigades of the Free Sunnis of Baalbak" claimed responsibility for the killing, labeling al-Laqqis as “the architect of the massacre of Qusayr”.

== December 22, 2013 clashes ==
On 23 December 2013, it was reported that at least 32 Nusra Front gunmen were killed in east Lebanon on December 22 in an ambush sprung by Hezbollah. A member of the Lebanese group was also killed in ensuing fighting. The event was one of the deadliest encounters between Syrian opposition (Nusra Front) and pro-Syrian Government forces (Hezbollah) within Lebanon since the beginning of the Syrian conflict.

== December 2013 Assassination of Mohamad Chatah ==
On 27 December 2013, a car bomb struck the convoy of Mohamad Chatah, a former Lebanese minister of finance and ambassador to the United States, in the Central District of Beirut, Lebanon. The bombing killed a total of eight people and injured seventy others.

== January 2, 2014 Bombing ==
On 2 January 2014, a car bomb exploded in the Haret Hreik district of Beirut, considered a Hezbollah stronghold. At least 5 were killed in the bombing.

== January 16, 2014 Hermel Bombing ==
On 16 January 2014, a suspected suicide bomber detonated a car bomb in the predominantly Shia Hezbollah stronghold of Hermel. At least 3 people were killed, including the suicide bomber, and 26 injured in the blast.

== January 17, 2014 rocket attack ==
On 17 January 2014, a day after a car bombing, rockets hit Hermel, causing no injuries. Another rocket attack hit Arsal, killing seven people and wounding 15.

== February 19, 2014 Iranian cultural centre bombing ==
On 19 February 2014, twin suicide bombing hit Iran's cultural centre in Beirut, killing at least seven people. Among the dead, in addition to the suicide bombers were four civilians and one military officer. The Al Qaeda-linked Abdullah Azzam Brigades claimed responsibility for the attack.

== February 20, 2014 Tripoli assassination ==
On 20 February 2014, Abdul Rahman Diab, an Arab Democratic Party official, was gunned down in his car in Tripoli.

== March 2014 clashes ==
During the month of March, fighting between factions increased exponentially,

On 23 March 2014, one was killed in clashes between Salafists and the Arab Movement Party, a pro-Assad Sunni Muslim group.

== August 2014 battle of Arsal ==
On 2 August 2014, the Lebanese Army clashed with Syrian gunmen in the town of Arsal, which left over a hundred fighters on both sides dead, starting a new phase of the tragedy.

== See also ==
- List of attacks in Lebanon
