= Attacks linked to the Cedar Revolution =

Series of bombings and assassinations in Lebanon

Since 2004, a series of bombings and assassinations have struck Lebanon, most of them occurring in and around the capital, Beirut. This wave of bombings began with the assassination attempt on Marwan Hamadeh, then peaked with the assassination of former Prime Minister Rafic Hariri on 14 February 2005, which touched off the Cedar Revolution and the withdrawal of Syrian troops. After the massive protests sparked by Hariri's killing, several more bombings hit Lebanon.

These bombings and assassinations came after September 2004, when the Lebanese Parliament was forced to extend the term of pro-Syrian former president Emile Lahoud, a move that was unconstitutional. The MPs, journalists, and activists that opposed this term extension were then subject to a series of slander campaigns and eventually assassination attempts.

== 2004 ==
=== Marwan Hamadeh assassination attempt ===
On 1 October 2004, a car bomb exploded next to the motorcade carrying Druze MP Marwan Hamadeh. Hamadeh was injured, but survived; his driver was killed. Hamadeh had been a critic of Syria and was a member of the opposition to then president Émile Lahoud.

== 2005 ==
=== Rafiq Hariri assassination ===
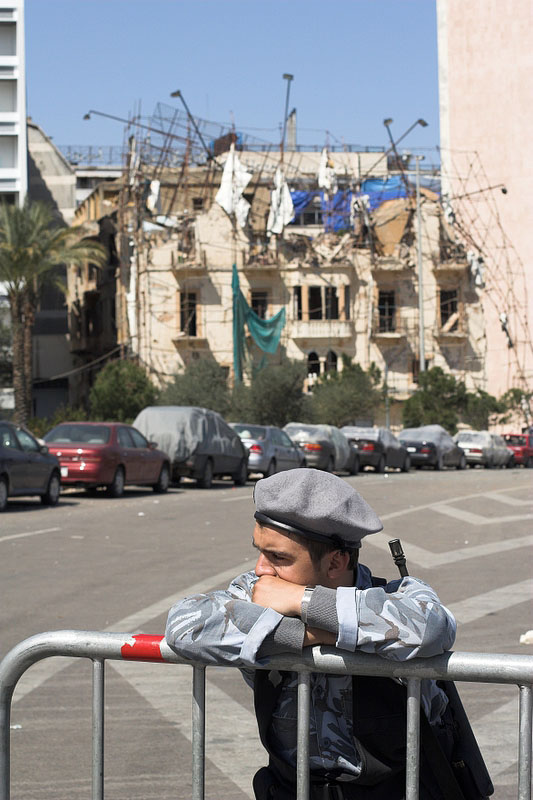
Ministry of the Interior soldier guarding the site of the attack that killed former Prime Minister Hariri

A massive explosion on 14 February 2005, killed former Lebanese Prime Minister Rafiq Hariri in Beirut, near the St. George Hotel. Also killed was the former Minister of the Economy, Bassel Fleihan, and 19 other people. About 220 others were wounded.

A group calling itself "The Nasra & Jihad Group in Greater Syria" claimed responsibility for the blast. The group had not been heard from before. A tape aired by Al Jazeera showed a bearded man, believed to be a Palestinian named Ahmad Abu Adas, claiming the attack. Adas' apartment was raided but he remains missing; however, it is now thought he was forced to admit to the plot and was killed by those who planned the assassination.

According to the United Nations report by Detlev Mehlis, released 20 October 2005, the blast was the result of a truck bomb. A security camera captured a white Mitsubishi truck driving near Hariri's convoy moments before the blast; investigators determined this truck carried the explosives, estimated at 1,000 kg. Since Hariri's convoy had jamming devices meant to block remote control signals, the attack was carried out using a suicide bomber. The report cited a witness who said the bomber was an Iraqi who was led to believe his target was Iraqi Prime Minister Iyad Allawi, who had been in Beirut just days before.

The report concluded that top Syrian and Lebanese officials planned the assassination beginning in mid-2004.

=== New Jdeideh bombing ===
A car bomb exploded in the New Jdeideh suburb of Beirut on 19 March 2005. The blast happened in a part-commercial, part-residential area, and wounded eleven people. Reports said that the driver had tried to park in front of a bingo hall, and was turned away and parked next to an apartment building instead.

=== Kaslik bombing ===
On 23 March, a bomb left in a leather bag exploded at the back entrance of the Kaslik shopping center in Jounieh. Three janitors, two Indians and a Pakistani, were killed, and two Sri Lankans and two Lebanese were injured. The roof of the mall collapsed.

=== Ali Ramez Tohme assassination attempt ===
The car of Ali Ramez Tohme, a journalist and president of the Dar al-Haitham for Journalism, Printing and Press, was bombed early on 15 September in the area of Mazboud. Tohme escaped the assassination attempt. There was speculation that the attack was motivated by an article written by Tohme defending Rafiq Hariri or his book on Hariri.

=== Sad el Bouchrieh bombing ===
On 26 March, a car loaded with explosives and parked between two factories exploded in the Sad el Bouchrieh area of Beirut, wounding six people. It caused a blaze which destroyed several workshops.

=== Broummana bombing ===
On 1 April, a bomb ripped through the Rizk plaza in the Broummana resort village, 20 km (12 mi) east of Beirut. Twelve people were injured.

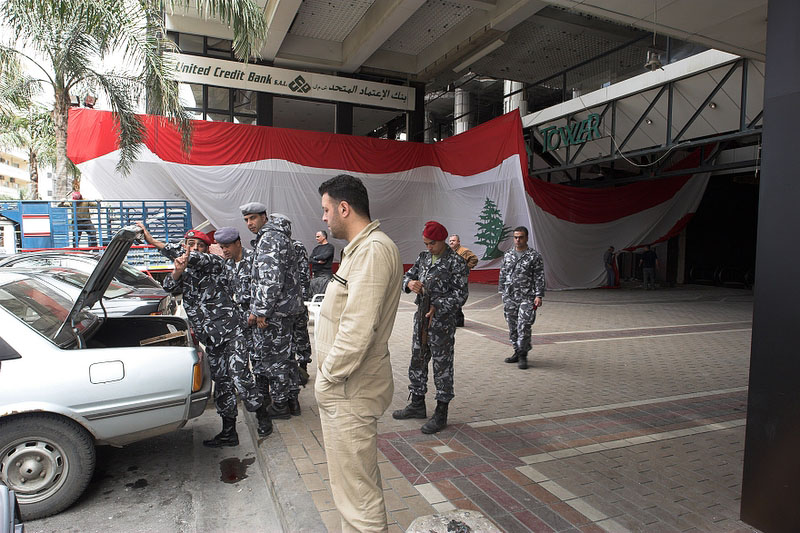
Jounieh bomb aftermath

=== Jounieh bombing ===
On 7 May, a car bomb exploded between the Christian Sawt al Mahaba radio station and the Mar Yuhanna Church in Jounieh. The radio station was destroyed and the church suffered major damage. Twenty-two people were wounded.

=== Samir Kassir assassination ===
Anti-Syrian journalist Samir Kassir was assassinated on 2 June when a bomb detonated in his car outside his home in Beirut's Ashrafiyeh district, a largely Christian residential area. Kassir was a front-page columnist for the An Nahar newspaper, where he wrote columns criticizing the pro-Syrian government.

=== George Hawi assassination ===
George Hawi, former Lebanese Communist Party leader and a critic of Israel and Syria, died when his car exploded as he was driving through Beirut's Wata Musaitbi district on 21 June.

=== Elias Murr assassination attempt ===
A car bomb wounded then Lebanese defense minister, and son-in-law of Emile Lahoud, Elias Murr, as his motorcade drove through Beirut's Christian suburb of Antelias on 12 July. Two people were killed and 12 others were injured. This attack was unique in the series of bombings in that Murr was considered a pro-Syrian figure.

=== Monot bombing ===
On 22 July, a bomb exploded in a car parked in front of a restaurant on Monot Street in Beirut, wounding twelve people. The bomb was estimated to be 50 lb.

=== Zalka bombing ===
In the mostly Christian neighborhood of Zalka, on 22 August, a bomb placed between a shopping center and a hotel damaged shops and windows, wounding eight people. It consisted of 20 to 30 kg of TNT and was set on a timer.

=== Jeitawi bombing ===
An explosion, believed caused by a car bomb, rocked the largely Christian area of Ashrafieh on 17 September. One person was killed and 23 injured. Two cars were blown up and buildings near the blast were severely damaged.

=== May Chidiac assassination attempt ===
Christian journalist and critic of Syria May Chidiac was seriously injured when a bomb exploded as she got into her car in Jounieh on 25 September. She lost her left leg and arm. Chidiac was a news anchor at the Lebanese Broadcasting Corporation.

=== Gebran Tueni Assassination ===
A prominent anti-Syrian journalist and lawmaker, Gebran Tueni, was killed by a car bomb on 12 December. He had returned from France only a day earlier, where he had been staying for fear of assassination. Two other people were killed – his driver and a passerby – when a car bomb exploded as his motorcade drove through Mkalles, an industrial suburb of Beirut. Another 30 people were wounded in the bombing, and at least 10 vehicles were destroyed.

On 28 December 2005, Lebanese newspaper An Nahar reported it had received a statement signed by "The Strugglers for the Unity and Freedom in al-Sham," the group that claimed responsibility for the death of its former editor Gibran Tueni with a car bomb on 12 December. The statement said outgoing UNIIIC chairman Mehlis was lucky to escape death and threatened any new chairman with assassination if he too implicated Syria.

== 2006 ==
=== Assassination of Pierre Amine Gemayel ===
Pierre Amine Gemayel, anti-Syrian MP, son of Kataeb leader & former President Amin Gemayel, nephew of assassinated President-elect Bashir Gemayyel, and Minister of Industry at the time was shot dead in Beirut on 21 November 2006.

== 2007 ==
=== Walid Eido ===
Walid Eido, another anti-Syrian MP, was killed by a car bomb on 13 June 2007 in Beirut, along with eight others, including his eldest son Khaled Eido.

=== Antoine Ghanem assassination ===
Anti-Syrian Lebanese MP Antoine Ghanem and four others were killed in a car bomb attack in a Christian suburb of Beirut on 19 September 2007.

=== Francois Elias Hajj assassination ===
Brigadier General François al-Hajj from the village of Rmaich was killed in a car bomb attack in Baabda, along with three other people, on 12 December 2007.

== 2008 ==
=== Wissam Eid assassination ===
Capt. Wissam Eid who was a computer engineer and a senior terrorism investigator at the Lebanese Internal Security Forces was assassinated on 25 January 2008. At the time of assassination, Eid was also top Lebanese investigator into the assassination of Prime Minister Rafiq Hariri. More specifically, he was analysing the telephone intercepts concerning the assassination when he was killed.

=== Tripoli bombing ===
On 13 August 2008, sixteen people, including seven Lebanese soldiers, were killed by a bomb targeting a civilian bus in Tripoli.

=== Saleh Aridi assassination ===
A pro-Syrian Druze politician of the Lebanese Democratic Party, Saleh Aridi, was killed in a car bomb on 10 September 2008.

=== Second Tripoli bombing ===
On 29 September 2008, five people, including five soldiers, were killed, and 35 were injured, by a car bomb which destroyed a bus in Tripoli.

== 2009 ==
=== Kamal Naji assassination ===
Kamal Naji, also known as Kamal Medhat, was the deputy representative of the Palestinian Liberation Organization (PLO) in Lebanon and a former Fatah intelligence chief in the country. He was killed by a roadside bomb while visiting a refugee camp to calm recent violence.

== 2012 ==
=== General Wissam al-Hassan assassination ===
Wissam al-Hassan, was assassinated on 19 October 2012 in a car bomb that was located in Achrafieh district of Beirut. He was killed along with two citizens, while a hundred and twenty others were injured. Wissam al-Hassan was the head of the information branch of Lebanon's Internal Security Forces and one of the country's key security officials. His death comes a few months after he investigated ex-Information Minister Michel Samaha, who was charged with smuggling bombs from Syria with the help of Syrian Security Chief Ali Mamlouk, in order to launch a series of terrorist attacks in Lebanon.

== 2013 ==
=== Bir El Abed bombing ===
On 9 July 2013, 53 people were injured, by a car bomb in Bir El Abed neighborhood Beirut. The blast erupted in a parking lot near the Islamic Cooperation Centre.

=== Mohamad Chatah assassination ===
27 Dec 2013: Mohamad Chatah, a former Finance Minister of Lebanon was killed in a car bombing in Beirut. Seven others were also killed.

=== Al-Salam and Al-Taqwa Mosques, Tripoli bombing ===
On 23 August 2013, over 400 people were injured by two car bombs planted in front of the Mosques, 62 people were murdered, the bombs targeted the two Imams of the Mosques, the Former General Director of the Lebanese Internal Security Forces, Ashraf Rifi, Sheikh Bilal Baroudi in the second bombing, and Sheikh Salem Al Raf'i in the first bombing. The first car bomb exploded in the Bab- Al Tebbane area which targeted Al Taqwa mosque. The second car exploded 10 minutes later in Al- Mina which targeted Al Salam mosque, and General Rifi.

The Leader of the Alawite Community in Tripoli Ali Eid, was blamed for the bombing, due to the fact that the men who were driving the cars, were from Jabal Mohsen where most of the Alawites in Tripoli live, and that Ali Eid claims that all Jabal Mohsen and Alawites in Tripoli are protected by the Arab Democratic Party, which is led by Ali Eid and his son Ref'at Eid.

== 2015 ==
On 12 November, bombings took place in the Southern suburb of Beirut killing more than 43 people.

== See also ==
- List of extrajudicial killings and political violence in Lebanon
- Syrian occupation of Lebanon
- Cedar Revolution
- List of attacks in Lebanon
