= Wissam Eid =

Lebanese security official (1976–2008)

Wissam Eid وسام عيد
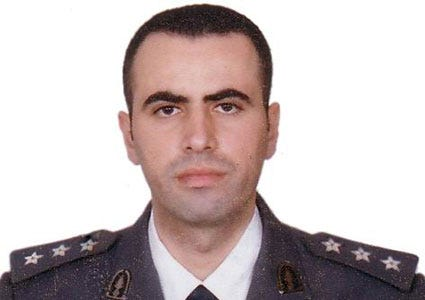
- Born: 2 October 1976; Deir Ammar, Lebanon
- Died: 25 January 2008 (aged 31); Hazmiyeh, Lebanon
- Cause of death: Assassination by car bomb
- Occupations: Police officer, senior terrorism investigator
- Known for: Holding key information linking Hezbollah to Rafic Hariri’s assassination

Wissam Eid (Arabic: وسام عيد; 2 October 1976 – 25 January 2008) was a Lebanese police officer and senior intelligence official. He is best known for providing vital information about the assassination of Lebanese prime minister Rafic Hariri to an international investigation on the assassination. However, Eid was assassinated by a car bomb in Beirut on 25 January 2008.

== Biography ==
Eid was born 2 October 1976 in Deir Ammar, near Tripoli in northern Lebanon. The son of an officer in the Lebanese Internal Security Forces (ISF), he studied in Tripoli, then obtained an engineering diploma in computer information systems from the University of Balamand in 1999.

He was in charge of the technical aspect of the investigations into the attacks that occurred since 2004, and had provided important information to the international investigation into the assassination of the former prime minister Rafic Hariri. According to the German news magazine Der Spiegel, the evidence implicating Hezbollah which Eid uncovered, involved a number of cellphones purchased in Tripoli shortly before the assassination. These cellphones were used by members of Hezbollah solely for the coordination of the assassination, except for a call from one of them to his girlfriend. Eid was assassinated himself before the conclusion of the investigation, though his work contributed greatly to the inquiry of the 2015 Special Tribunal of Lebanon.

On 25 January 2008 at 10 a.m., a car bomb containing an explosive charge of at least 50 kg of explosives, detonated and killed Eid, despite him being in an armored vehicle. The bombing also killed his bodyguard and two civilians, and injured dozens of people. The attack occurred in the suburb of Hazmiyeh. Even though he was a Lebanese police officer, the investigation of his assassination was never concluded.

== See also ==
- List of extrajudicial killings and political violence in Lebanon
- Rafic Hariri
- Elias Bayssari
- List of attacks in Lebanon
- Unit 121
- Salim Ayyash
