= List of attacks in Lebanon =

List of bombings and assassinations in Lebanon since 2004

Starting in 2004, a series of bombings and assassinations struck Lebanon, most of them in and around the capital, Beirut. This wave of bombings began with the assassination attempt on Marwan Hamadeh, then became more intense with the assassination of former Prime Minister Rafiq Hariri on February 14, 2005, which touched off the Cedar Revolution and the withdrawal of Syrian troops. After the massive protests following Hariri's killing, several more terrorist attacks hit Lebanon. Part of the attacks are allegedly linked to Syria and Unit 121.

These bombings and assassinations came after September 2004, when the Lebanese Parliament was pressured by Syria to extend the term of pro-Syrian President Emile Lahoud through a constitutional amendment. The MPs, journalists, and activists that opposed this term extension were subject to slander, harassment and, in many cases, assassination attempts. Since 2013 most of the bombings were not related to the Cedar Revolution but rather a spillover of the Syrian civil war. This list is limited to bombings and assassinations; it does not include other forms of attacks. It is presented in chronological order.

== 2004 ==
- Marwan Hamadeh assassination attempt (October 1) – A car bomb exploded next to the motorcade carrying Druze MP Marwan Hamadeh. Hamadeh was injured, but survived; his driver was killed. Hamadeh was a critic of Syria and a member of the opposition to President Émile Lahoud.

== 2005 ==
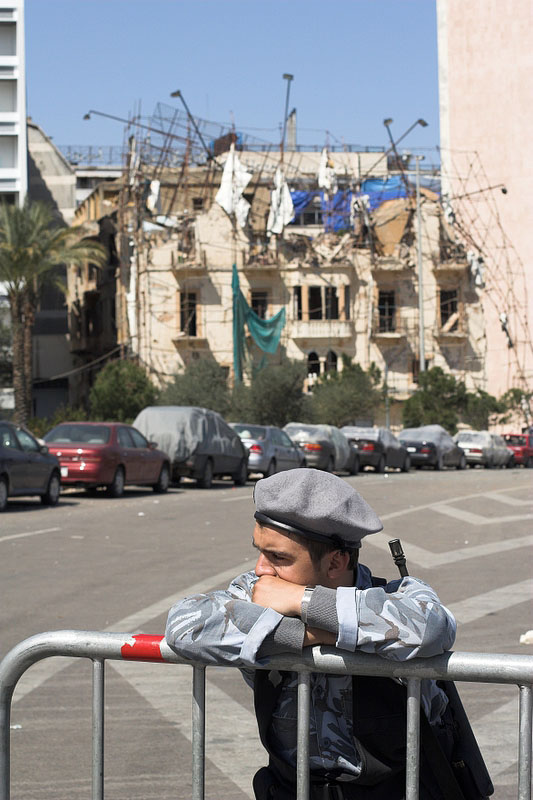
A Lebanese Internal Security Forces officer guarding the site of the attack that killed former Prime Minister Hariri

- Rafiq Hariri assassination (February 14) – A massive explosion killed former Lebanese Prime Minister Rafiq Hariri in Beirut, near the St. George Hotel. The former Minister of the Economy, Bassel Fleihan, was also among the 22 killed. About 220 others were wounded. A group calling itself "Al Nusra and Jihad in greater Syria" claimed responsibility for the blast. According to the UN report, released October 20, the blast was the result of a truck bomb. Security video had captured a white truck driving near Hariri's convoy which investigators determined was carrying an estimated 1,000 kg of explosives. Since Hariri's convoy had jamming devices meant to block remote control signals, the attack was carried out using a suicide bomber. The report cited a witness who said the bomber was an Iraqi who was led to believe his target was Iraqi Prime Minister Iyad Allawi, who had been in Beirut just days before. The report concluded that top Syrian and Lebanese officials planned the assassination beginning in mid-2004.
- New Jdeideh bombing(March 19) – A car bomb exploded in the New Jdeideh suburb of Beirut. The blast happened in a mixed commercial-residential area and wounded 11 people. Reports said that the driver had tried to park in front of a bingo hall and was turned away, so he instead parked next to an apartment.
- Kaslik bombing (March 23) – A bomb left in a leather bag exploded at the back entrance of the Kaslik shopping center in Jounieh. Two Indian and one Pakistani janitor were killed, and two Sri Lankans and two Lebanese injured. The roof of the mall collapsed.
- Sad el-Bouchrieh bombing (March 26) – A car bomb parked between two factories exploded in the Sad el-Bouchrieh area of Beirut, wounding 6 people. It caused a blaze which destroyed several workshops.
- Broummana bombing (April 1) – A bomb ripped through the Rizk plaza in the Broummana resort village, 20 km (12 mi) east of Beirut. 12 people were injured.

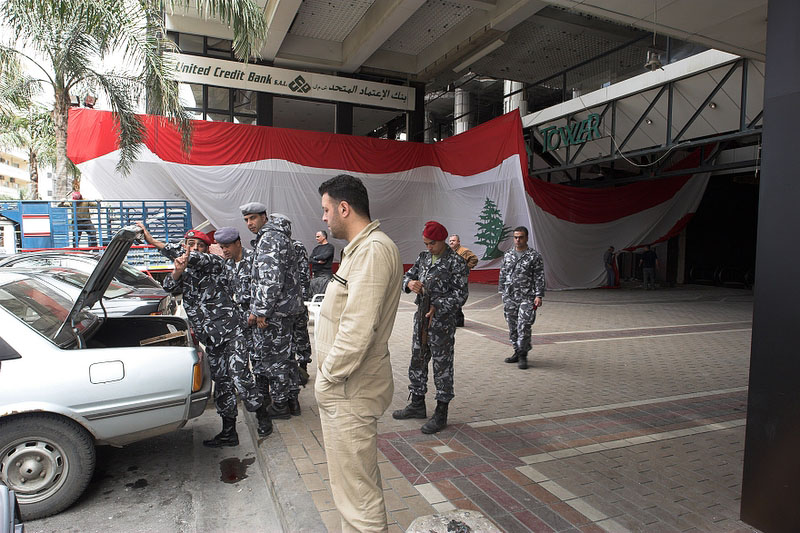
Jounieh bomb aftermath

- Jounieh bombing (May 7) – A car bomb exploded between the Christian Sawt al Mahaba radio station and the Mar Yuhanna Church in Jounieh. The radio station was destroyed and the church suffered major damage. 22 people were wounded.
- Samir Kassir assassination (June 2) – Anti-Syrian journalist Samir Kassir was assassinated when a bomb detonated in his car outside his home in Beirut's Ashrafiyeh district, a largely Christian residential area. Kassir was a front-page columnist for the al-Nahar newspaper, where he wrote columns criticizing the pro-Syrian government.
- George Hawi assassination (June 21) – Former Lebanese Communist Party leader George Hawi, a critic of Syria, died when his car exploded as he was driving through Beirut's Wata Musaitbi district.
- Elias Murr assassination attempt (July 12) – A car bomb wounded the outgoing Lebanese defense minister, Elias Murr, as his motorcade drove through Beirut's Christian suburb of Antelias. 2 people were killed and 12 others injured. This attack was unique in the series of bombings in that Murr was considered a pro-Syrian figure.
- Monot bombing (July 22) – A bomb exploded in a car parked in front of a restaurant on Monot Street in Beirut, wounding 12 people. The bomb was estimated to be 23 kg (50 lb).
- Zalka bombing (August 22) – In the mostly Christian neighborhood of Zalka a bomb placed between a shopping center and a hotel damaged shops and windows, wounding 8 people. It consisted of 20 to 30 kg (44 to 66 lb) of TNT and was set on a timer.
- Jeitawi bombing (September 17) – An explosion in the largely Christian area of Ashrafieh killed 1 person and injured 23 others. It was believed to have been caused by a car bomb; two cars were destroyed and buildings near the blast were severely damaged.
- May Chidiac assassination attempt (September 25) – Christian journalist and critic of Syria May Chidiac was seriously injured when a bomb exploded as she got into her car in Jounieh. She lost her left leg and arm. Chidiac was an anchor on the Lebanese Broadcasting Corporation.
- Gebran Tueni assassination (December 12) – A prominent anti-Syrian journalist and lawmaker, Gebran Tueni, was killed by a car bomb. He had returned from France only a day earlier, where he had been staying for fear of assassination. His driver and a passerby were also killed when a car bomb exploded as his motorcade drove through Mkalles, an industrial suburb of Beirut. 3 people were killed and another 30 wounded in the bombing, and at least 10 vehicles were destroyed. The December 28 An Nahar reported that the group "The Strugglers for the Unity and Freedom in al Sham" had claimed responsibility for the bombing in a statement which said outgoing UNIIIC chairman Detlev Mehlis was lucky to escape death and threatened any new chairman with assassination if he too implicated Syria.

== 2006 ==
- Mahmoud al Majzoub assassination (May 25) – A bomb killed Mahmoud al Majzoub, the leader of the Palestinian Islamic Jihad, in Sidon, south of Lebanon.
- Pierre Amine Gemayel assassination (November 21) – Anti-Syrian Minister of Industry Pierre Amine Gemayel, son of Kataeb leader Amin Gemayel and nephew of assassinated President Bashir Gemayyel, was shot dead in Beirut.

== 2007 ==
- Bikfaya bombing (February 13) – A bomb on a bus near Bikfaya killed 3 people and wounded 21 others.
- ABC bombing (May 20) – Explosives placed near the ABC mall in Achrafieh killed 1 civilian and wounded 18 others.
- Verdun bombing (May 21) – An explosion in the affluent Beirut district of Verdun injured 10 people including 2 children.
- Aley bombing (May 23) – An explosion in the town of Aley wounded 5 people.
- Walid Eido assassination (June 13) – Walid Eido, an anti-Syrian MP, was killed by a car bomb in Beirut along with 8 others, including his eldest son Khaled Eido.
- Antoine Ghanem assassination (September 19) – Anti-Syrian Lebanese MP Antoine Ghanem and four others were killed in a car bomb attack in a Christian suburb of Beirut.
- Francois Elias Hajj assassination (December 12) – Brigadier General François al-Hajj, from the village of Rmaich, was among 4 killed in a car bomb attack in Baabda.

== 2008 ==
- US diplomat bombing (January 15) – A bomb targeted against a US diplomatic vehicle killed 4 Lebanese civilians and wounded 16 others.
- Wissam Eid assassination (January 25) – Capt. Wissam Eid, Lebanese Internal Security Forces senior terrorism investigator, was assassinated. At the time of the attack, Eid was also the top Lebanese investigator into the assassination of Prime Minister Rafiq Hariri.
- Tripoli bus bombing (August 13) – A bomb targeting a civilian bus in Tripoli killed 16 people, including 7 Lebanese soldiers.
- Saleh Aridi assassination (September 10) – Saleh Aridi, a pro-Syrian Druze politician of the Lebanese Democratic Party, was killed by a car bomb.
- Tripoli car bomb (September 29) – A car bomb destroyed a bus in Tripoli, killing 5 soldiers and injuring 35 others.

== 2009 ==
- Kamal Naji assassination (March 24) – The deputy head of the PLO in Lebanon was killed along 4 other people by a roadside bomb near Sidon.

== 2012 ==
- Wissam al Hassan assassination (October 19) – Head of the intelligence branch of the Internal Security Forces (ISF) Maj. Gen. Wissam al-Hassan was killed by a massive car bomb in Achrafieh. 128 were injured and 8 others died.

== 2013 ==
- Roueiss bombing (August 15) – An attack on the Roueiss neighborhood in south Beirut killed 27 people and injured over 300. The attack was believed to have been carried out through a car bomb. Similar to the Beir el-Abed bombing, this attack targeted a Hizbollah stronghold.
- Tripoli dual bombings (August 23) – Bombs hit two mosques killing at least 42 people and wounding hundreds. The first explosion hit the Taqwa mosque, and killed at least 14 people there. Further deaths were reported from a second blast a few minutes later outside the al-Salam mosque, which the Interior Ministry said was hit by a car laden with 100 kg (220 lbs) of explosives.
- Beir Hassan bombing (November 19) – A large explosion near an Iranian cultural center in the southern suburbs of Beirut killed at least 22 people and injured 146 others in a double bomb attack. The explosion appeared to have been caused by a car bomb and a motorcycle laden with explosives.
- Hassan Lakkis assassination (December 3) – A senior Hezbollah commander named Hassan Lakkis was assassinated by two gunmen in Beirut.
- Mohamad Chatah assassination (December 27) – Former-minister Mohamad Chatah, member of the Future Movement, and 5 others were killed by a car bomb that targeted Chatah's vehicle. Approximately 70 people were wounded in the attack.

== 2014 ==
- Haret Hreik bombing (January 2) – Explosives were detonated in front of the political office of Hizbollah, killing 4 and injuring 77 others. Several buildings were damaged and flames engulfed vehicles parked on Al-Arid Street, where the explosives-rigged vehicle had been parked.
- 1st Hermel bombing (January 16) – A suspected suicide car-bombing killed 5 people and wounded 42 others in a bustling neighborhood in the northeastern town of Hermel.
- 2nd Hermel bombing (February 1) – Another terrorist explosion targeted Hermel, killing 4 and injuring 23 civilians in an attack that was claimed by an Al-Qaeda-linked group. The suicide bomber drove a Grand Cherokee Jeep up to a petrol station in the Zahraa area of the city where he then detonated a car bomb.
- Van bombing (February 3) – A suicide bombing injured 2 people south of Beirut.
- Iranian cultural center bombings (February 19) – Two suicide bombings killed 8 people and wounded 128 others near the Iranian cultural center in Beirut.
- 3rd Hermel bombing (February 22) – A suicide car bombing targeting an army post in Hermel killed 3 people including 2 soldiers and wounded 17 others. The Lebanon branch of the Nusra Front, a radical Syrian rebel force, claimed responsibility for the suicide bombing, saying it was part of a "series of vengeful attacks".
- Arsal bombing (March 29) – A suicide car bomb killed 3 Lebanese soldiers and wounded 4 others in the northeastern town of Arsal.
- Dahr al Baidar bombing (June 20) – A suicide bomber killed a police officer and wounded 32 people at a checkpoint in east Lebanon.
- Beirut cafe bombing (June 24) – A suicide bomber driving an old Mercedes wounded 12 people near a cafe and a military checkpoint in Beirut.
- Duroy Hotel bombing (June 27) – A suicide bomber wounded 11 people in a Beirut hotel. Security forces attempted to arrest him before the explosion.
- Tripoli bomb (August 6) – A homemade bomb killed 1 civilian and wounded 10 others near an army checkpoint in Tripoli.
- 2nd Arsal bombing (September 19) – A bomb killed 2 Lebanese soldiers and wounded 3 others in Arsal.
- Hezbollah bombing (September 20) – A bombing targeted a Hezbollah checkpoint in eastern Lebanon. The number of casualties is disputed.
- 3rd Arsal bombing (November 14) – A bomb wounded 3 soldiers in Arsal.
- 4th Arsal bombing (December 3) – Another bomb in Arsal killed 1 soldier and wounded 2 others.

== 2015 ==
- Jabal Mohsen cafe bombing (January 10) – A double suicide-bombing in Tripoli killed 9 people and injured at least 50 others.
- Ghassan Ajaj assassination (January 26) – An intelligence officer was assassinated by a gunman in northern Lebanon.
- Bader Eid assassination (March 2) – The brother of Alawite leader Ali Eid was assassinated in northern Lebanon.
- Second Hezbollah bombing (October 5) – A bombing targeted a bus transporting Hezbollah fighters to Syria. The number of casualties could not be determined.
- 5th Arsal bombing (November 5) – A bombing killed at least 5 people and wounded 15 others in the eastern town of Arsal.
- 6th Arsal bombing (November 6) – A blast wounded 5 Lebanese soldiers in Arsal.
- Bourj el-Barajneh bombing (November 12) – Two suicide bombers killed 89 people and wounded more than 200 in the southern Beirut suburb of Bourj el-Barajneh, a Hezbollah stronghold.
- Deir Ammar bombing (December 5) – A suicide bomber killed 3 people and wounded 6 others during an army raid in North Lebanon.

== 2016 ==
- 7th Arsal bombing (March 24) – A roadside bomb killed a Lebanese soldier and wounded 3 others in Arsal.
- Fathi Zaydan assassination (April 12) – An explosion killed Fathi Zaydan, a Fatah senior officer near the main Palestinian camp in South Lebanon.
- Blom Bank bombing (June 12) – An explosion caused material damage outside a branch of the biggest bank in Lebanon.
- Qaa Bombings (June 27) – Several suicide bombings killed at least 5 people and wounded more than 12 in the eastern village of Al Qaa. Security officials believe Islamic State militants were behind the attack although no one claimed responsibility.
- 8th Arsal bombing (August 15) – A bomb wounded 5 soldiers in the eastern village of Arsal.
- Zahle bombing (August 31) – A bomb killed 1 person and injured several others in the eastern city of Zahle.
- Al Ain (December 28) – A small explosion killed the deputy mayor of Al Ain, a town in northeastern Lebanon.

== 2018 ==
- Mohammad Hamdan attempted assassination (January 14) – A car bomb injured a Hamas official in the southern city of Saida.

== 2021 ==
- Lokman Slim assassination (Feb 2) – A prominent critic of Hezbollah has been shot dead in South Lebanon.

== 2023 ==
- Ashraf al-Armouchi assassination (July 30) – A Palestinian Fatah commander was killed in the Palestinian refugee camp of Ain el Helweh by Palestinian Islamists.
- Elias Hasrouni assassination (Aug 10) – A senior Lebanese Forces official was killed in the Southern village of Ain Ebel.

== 2024 ==
- 2024 Beirut US embassy shooting (June 5) – An armed assailant opened fire on the embassy located in the Awkar area in Beirut, lightly injuring a security guard. The attacker was wounded and detained by the Lebanese Armed Forces.
- 2024 Lebanon pager explosions
- 2024 Hezbollah headquarters strike

== 2026 ==
- 2026 Ghazali family killing
- Killing of Pierre al-Rahi

== Pre-Lahoud term extension ==
The assassinations and bombings listed above occurred after September 2004, in the aftermath of the forced term extension of the pro-Syrian Lebanese President Emile Lahoud. The events listed below had nothing to do with the extension of Emile Lahoud's presidential term, and most of them occurred long before.

- Riad al-Solh assassination (July 17, 1951) – Several months after leaving office Riad al-Solh, Lebanon's first post-independence Prime Minister, was assassinated in Amman, Jordan by a member of the Syrian Social Nationalist Party.
- Naim Moghabghab assassination (July 27, 1959) – MP Naim Moghabghab was assassinated in Maaser Beit el Dine, Lebanon after his car was attacked by opposition supporters. He is considered one of the heroes of the independence of Lebanon.
- Maarouf Saad assassination (March 6, 1975) – The Sunni politician and Sidon leader Maarouf Saad was shot on February 26 during a demonstration in Sidon. His death several days later was considered to be a partial trigger for the start of the civil war.
- Kamal Jumblatt assassination (March 16, 1977) – Druze leader Kamal Jumblatt was killed close to his home in the Chouf area. Though it has not been proven in court, the assassination is largely blamed on Syria.
- Ehden massacre (June 13, 1978) – Tony Franjieh, son of former president Suleiman Franjieh, was assassinated in his house by militiamen of the Lebanese Kataeb party.
- Bashir Gemayel assassination (September 14, 1982) – President-elect Bashir Gemayel was killed by Habib Shartouni, a member of the Syrian Social Nationalist Party. His brother Amin Gemayel became president of Lebanon instead.
- 1983 United States Embassy bombing (April 18, 1983) – The American Embassy in Beirut was bombed. 63 people, including 17 Americans, lost their lives in the attack.
- 1983 Beirut barracks bombing (October 23, 1983) – The Beirut barracks bombing killed more than 200 American and French armed-forces personnel.
- 1985 Beirut car bombing (March 8, 1985) – More than 60 were killed and 200 injured in an explosion in Beirut.
- April 8, 1986: A bomb in Kesrwan, Jounieh, in the northern coastal suburbs of Beirut, killed 10 civilians and injured 114.
- Rashid Karami assassination (June 1, 1987) – Prime Minister Rashid Karami was killed by bomb during a helicopter flight.
- Hassan Khaled assassination (May 16, 1989) – Head of the Sunni community in Lebanon, Mufti Sheikh Hassan Khaled, was killed by car bomb in Beirut. The assassination is largely blamed on Syria.
- René Mouawad assassination (November 22, 1989) – President René Mouawad, the second President of Lebanon to be killed by Syria, was assassinated by a car bomb three weeks after becoming president.
- Dany Chamoun assassination (October 21, 1990) – Leader of the National Liberal Party Dany Chamoun shot dead in a suburb of Beirut.
- Abbas al-Musawi assassination (February 16, 1992) – Leader of Hezbollah Abbas al-Musawi was killed by Israel in Jibsheet, a town in southern Lebanon.
- Elie Hobeika assassination (January 24, 2002) – Former Lebanese Forces intelligence officer, Syrian ally, former Lebanese government minister and member of parliament, and one of the planners of the Sabra and Shatila massacre, Elie Hobeika was assassinated by a car bombing in the Beirut suburb of Hazmieh.

== See also ==
- List of extrajudicial killings and political violence in Lebanon
- Syrian occupation of Lebanon
- Lebanon bombings and assassinations (2004–present)
- Syrian Civil War spillover in Lebanon
- Terrorism in Lebanon
- Timeline of violent events relating to the Syrian Civil War spillover in Lebanon (2011–14)
- Timeline of violent events relating to the Syrian Civil War spillover in Lebanon (2014–present)
