= Information Branch =

Lebanese Intelligence Unit

Information Department
Agency overview
- Formed: August 6, 1993
- Headquarters: Beirut, Lebanon
- Employees: Classified
- Annual budget: Classified
- Agency executives: Wissam al-Hassan, Brigadier General †; Imad Othman, Major General; Khaled Hammoud, Brigadier General
- Parent department: Internal Security Forces Directorate
- Website: https://isf.gov.lb/en/article/183/

The Information Department (Arabic: شعبة المعلومات), commonly known as the Information Branch (Arabic: فرع المعلومات) or the Information (Arabic: المعلومات), is the intelligence unit of the Internal Security Forces Directorate (Arabic: المديرية العامة لقوى الأمن الداخلي). It is mainly tasked with gathering, processing, and analyzing national and military intelligence, counterintelligence, counterterrorism, criminal investigation, and espionage.

Acting as a counterweight to the Intelligence Directorate of the Lebanese Armed Forces (Arabic: مديرية المخابرات في الجيش اللبناني), it was extensively trained and supplied by the United States, France, and Germany. Having undergone training in the Alps, its Strike Force (Arabic: القوة الضاربة) is equipped with advanced firearms and devices.

Recognized as one of the most powerful intelligence agencies in the Middle East, its executives and officers have been subject to targeted assassinations and assassination attempts.

== In popular culture ==
TV Series

- Lebanese TV Series "2020" and its sequel "2024" talk about the Information Branch's role and capabilities in counterterrorism.

- Lebanese TV Series "Al Ameel" showcase the Information Branch's role in stopping smuggling.

== See also ==
- General Directorate of General Security
- Lebanese State Security
- October 2012 Beirut bombing
