= Arab Movement Party =

Lebanese political party

Arab Movement Party حزب التيار العربي
- Abbreviation: AMP
- Leader: Shaker al-Barjawi
- Founder: Shaker al-Barjawi
- Founded: 2000
- Headquarters: Beirut
- Ideology: Nasserism; Arab Nationalism; Anti-Zionism
- International affiliation: March 8 Alliance (since 2008); March 14 Alliance (until 2008)
- Colours: Red
- Parliament of Lebanon: 0 / 128
- Cabinet of Lebanon: 0 / 30

The Arab Movement Party (Arabic: تحزب التيار العربي, romanized: Hizb al-Tayyār al-Arabi) is a Nasserist political party in Lebanon led by Sunni politician Shaker al-Barjawi.

== History ==
The party was founded circa 2000 by Shaker al-Barjawi, a former member of the Iraqi-aligned Ba'ath Party. Barjawi left the Ba'athists in 1982 following the Israeli invasion of Lebanon and moved towards Nasserism. Following the February 6 uprising in West Beirut that defeated the Lebanese Army and the Multinational Force in Lebanon, Barjawi founded the February Six Movement, which would later transform into the Arab Movement Party.

Barjawi had mixed relations with the Syrian government during their occupation of Lebanon. He initially received support from the Syrian government, but fell out of favor with them, and was briefly jailed in Syria in 1991.

The Arab Movement Party has had an antagonistic relationship with the Sunni Future Movement. In May 2012, gunmen from the two parties clashed in the Tariq al-Jadideh neighborhood of Beirut. The fight, part of the Syrian civil war spillover in Lebanon, killed at least three people and injured nine.

In March 2014, one of the party's members was killed in clashes against Salafist militants in Beirut. The fight was ended after the intervention of the Lebanese Army. Barjawi accused the Future Movement of being behind the attack.

The party declined to participate in the 2022 parliamentary elections, with Barjawi stating that there is a "popular refusal to participate in the parliamentary elections, especially among our Sunni sect", and expressing frustration with his allies in the March 8 Alliance.

In October 2023, the party stated that its militia, the Martyr Abu Taha Battalion, was prepared to engage in armed resistance against Israel in the event of a war.
