= Assassination of Wissam al-Hassan =

2012 car bomb attack in Beirut, Lebanon

October 2012 Beirut bombing
- Part of Syrian civil war spillover in Lebanon
- Location: Beirut, Lebanon
- Date: 19 October 2012
- Target: Wissam al-Hassan
- Attack type: Car bomb
- Deaths: 8
- Injuries: 110

On 19 October 2012, Wissam al-Hassan, a brigadier general of the Lebanese Internal Security Forces (ISF) and the head of its intelligence-oriented information branch, died along with several others killed by a car bomb in the Achrafieh district of Beirut. The killing of a senior figure closely linked with the anti-Assad camp in Lebanon led to immediate speculation that Syria, or its allies, were behind the attack in Beirut. Al-Hassan had also led the investigation that implicated Syria and its ally Hezbollah in the killing of the former prime minister Rafik Hariri.

According to a report in Der Spiegel, Hezbollah might have had a hand in the attack on al-Hassan since his cooperation with the International Criminal Tribunal had made him a sworn enemy of the Party. The FBI noted similarities with the Hariri assassination, between the explosives used, planning and execution of the attack, and that they point to the same group of perpetrators.

According to Lebanon's National News Agency, a total of eight died and 110 were injured in the explosion, making it the deadliest bombing in Beirut since 2008.

== Background ==
In the summer of 2011, sporadic fighting between supporters and opponents of the government of neighboring Syria began to occur in Lebanon as fallout from a civil war in Syria. The conflict has resulted in violent unrest and kidnappings of foreign citizens across Lebanon.

== Target ==
The target of the attack is believed to have been al-Hassan, the head of the intelligence branch of the Lebanese Internal Security Forces (ISF), a key player in the opposition March 14 alliance and one of Lebanon's leading Sunni Muslims. During the summer of 2012, al-Hassan lead an investigation that uncovered what the Lebanese government alleged to be plots planned by the Syrian government to interfere with the conflict in Lebanon.

== Bombing ==
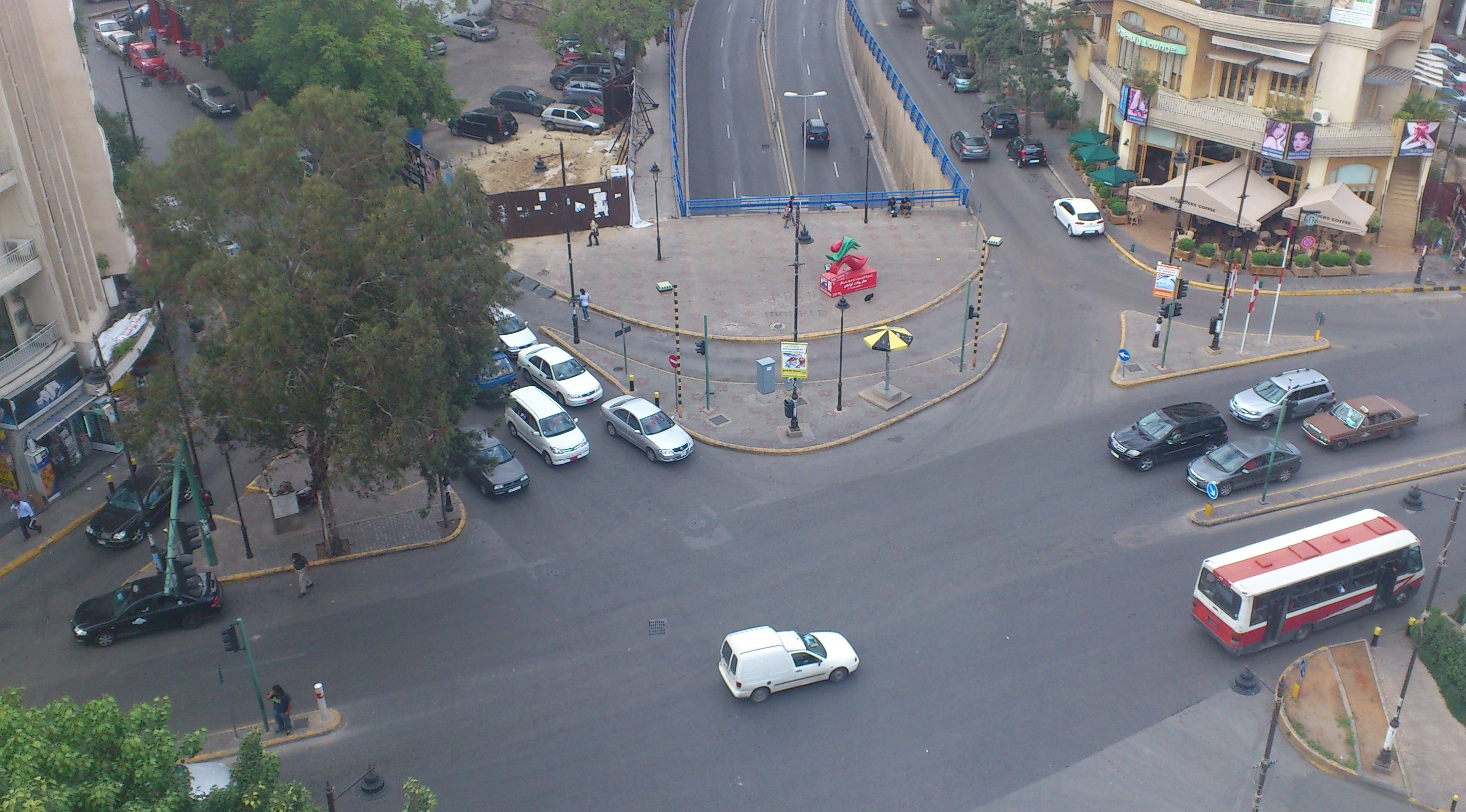
Sassine Square in 2011

after bombing, a video by The Daily Star Lebanon.

The bomb went off at 14:50 on Ibrahim Monzer Street near the Sassine Square in the largely Greek Orthodox Christian Achrafieh district of Beirut. The attack took place in a narrow street 100 metres from the offices of the Kataeb Party, a member in the 14 March alliance. The headquarters of the 14 March alliance itself are 300 metres away from the blast site. Ashraf Rifi reported that the bomb blasted outside one of al-Hassan's secret offices that were used for meeting with informants. Al-Hassan's car was an unarmored rental car for camouflage.

According to preliminary examinations by the explosive experts of the Lebanese Army, the car had been rigged with explosives equivalent to 30 kilograms of TNT. The explosion, described as "massive", left a large crevice in the road and tore off the balconies of nearby buildings. The car in which the bomb is believed to have been delivered was reportedly split in two by the force of the explosion, which also sent debris hundreds of meters away.

The exact casualty count was at first unclear: Lebanon's National News Agency first said eight people had died and more than 90 were injured, but the figure was later amended to four deaths and 110 injuries. Al-Hassan's driver, Ahmad Suhyuni, is believed to have perished with al-Hassan in the attack.

== Reactions ==
=== Lebanon ===
Prime Minister Najib Mikati said the government was trying to identify the perpetrators and they would be punished, but linked the assassination to the arrest of Samaha.

Hezbollah condemned the blast, describing it as a "sinful attempt to target the stability and national unity", and urged the official bodies to mobilize all capacities to bring the perpetrators to justice.

Future Movement's former Prime Minister Saad Hariri described the bombing as an act of terror and, in statements to CNN said "he had no doubt that the Syrian president Bashar al-Assad was responsible for the attack" and that al-Hassan had been murdered because of his involvement in the arrest of the former information minister Michel Samaha. Samaha was charged with transporting explosives into Lebanon with the help of the Syrian Security Chief Ali Mamlouk in an alleged attempt to destabilize the country.

Saad Hariri's accusation was echoed by a number of other politicians from the 14 March alliance. Members of the 14 March alliance also called for the resignation of the Mikati and his cabinet, saying they held Mikati's government "politically and morally responsible" for the attack. MP Moeen Merhebi warned that he was expecting more attacks the Syrian government targeting Lebanon. Samir Geagea, the leader of Lebanese Forces, Walid Jumblatt, the leader of Progressive Socialist Party and Amine Gemayel of the Kataeb party also accused Syria of the assassination.

Lebanon's Maronite Patriarch Bechara Rai and Grand Mufti of the Lebanese Republic Sheikh Mohammad Rashid Qabbani also condemned the blast.

=== Protests ===
Hours following the blast, opposition supporters in Beirut, Sidon, Tripoli and Btouratige (al-Hassan's residence), took to the streets burning tires, setting up burning roadblocks and denouncing the Syrian authorities and Hezbollah. CNN reported that gunfire had erupted in Beirut.

Al-Hassan was buried on 21 October near Rafik Hariri's tomb at Martyrs' Square in downtown Beirut. After the funeral, there were demonstrations calling for the government to step down, leading to riots near the Grand Serail, the prime minister's office. Opposition leader Saad Hariri, however, urged the demonstrators to end violence and withdraw from the streets. Sectarian clashes resulted in the deaths of six people. Fighting between Lebanese troops and unidentified armed men took place in Beirut, Lebanon. The Sunni-Shia conflict resulted in exchanges of rocket and gun fire, according to local residents.

=== International ===
- United Nations — The Security Council issued an "unequivocal condemnation" of the terrorist attack while the U.N. Secretary-General Ban Ki-moon urged "all Lebanese parties not to be provoked by this heinous terrorist act and to maintain their commitment to national unity."
- European Union — European Union's High Representative Catherine Ashton condemned the attack, drawing attention to the civilian deaths.
- France — The office of the French president François Hollande urged Lebanese politicians to stay united and guard against attempts to destabilize the country "no matter where they come from", describing the death of al-Hassan as a great loss. The French Foreign Minister Laurent Fabius urged for restraint in Lebanon, saying "more than ever it is necessary for Lebanon to stay out of regional tension." Fabius later said in a television interview that Syria was probably involved in the bombing.
- Syria — Syrian Information Minister Omran al Zohbi condemned the car bombing, commenting to Syrian Arab News Agency (SANA) "these sorts of terrorist, cowardly attacks are unjustifiable wherever they occur."
- Iran — The spokesperson of the foreign ministry condemned the attack and blamed it on Israel, saying the regime "benefits from instability and lack of security in the region".
- Saudi Arabia — The country's official news agency, the Saudi Press Agency, issued a news report, strongly condemning the terrorist attack.
- United States — Spokesperson of the United States Department of State said the U.S. would "stand by the people of Lebanon" and reaffirmed her administration's "commitment to a stable, sovereign and independent Lebanon".

== See also ==
- List of extrajudicial killings and political violence in Lebanon
