= Salim Ayyash =

Hezbollah military officer (1963–2024)

- Born: 10 November 1963; Harouf, Nabatieh Governorate, Lebanon
- Died: 9 November 2024 (aged 60); Al-Qusayr, Syria

Salim Jamil Ayyash (Arabic: سليم جميل عيّاش; 10 November 1963 – 9 November 2024) was a Lebanese militant and senior Hezbollah military operative, who served as the head of its assassination squad Unit 121. He is best known for his indictment by the Special Tribunal for Lebanon as one of the major individuals involved in the assassination of the Lebanese Prime Minister Rafic Hariri.

Following the publishing of his name by the investigation from the Tribunal, Ayyash went into hiding and never appeared in front of the Tribunal, and a second indictment was confirmed against him in another case on 15 May 2019 by the Tribunal. He was tried in absentia. Rewards for Justice Program was offering $10 million for information on him. On 9 November 2024, he was killed by an Israeli air strike in Syria.

== Biography ==
Born in Harouf, Nabatieh Governorate, Lebanon, Ayyash's parents were Jameel Dakheel Ayyash and Mahasen Issa Salameh. He lived in various locations in Hadath in the southern suburbs in Nabatieh in South Lebanon before disappearing.

On 18 August 2020, he was found guilty of the assassination and the death of 21 other individuals in the incident that occurred in February 2005. He was found guilty on five charges including the intentional murder of Hariri with premeditation by using explosive materials.

Three other indictees were acquitted due to lack of conclusive evidence including Hussein Oneissi, Assad Sabra and Hassan Merhi. Similar charges against a fourth principal indictee Mustafa Badreddine were dropped after he died on 13 May 2016. Proceedings against him were terminated on 12 July 2016.

Ayyash was sentenced by the Special Tribunal for Lebanon in absentia on 11 December 2020.

On 10 November 2024, reports claimed that Ayyash was killed by an Israeli airstrike in Al-Qusayr, Syria.

== See also ==
- Unit 121
- Hezbollah
- Unit 910
- List of extrajudicial killings and political violence in Lebanon
