= Timeline of violent events relating to the Syrian civil war spillover in Lebanon (2014–present) =

From its inception, the Syrian Civil War has produced and inspired a great deal of strife and unrest in the nation of Lebanon. Prior to the Battle of Arsal in August 2014, the Lebanese Army has tried to keep out of it and the violence has been mostly between various factions within the country and overt Syrian involvement has been limited to airstrikes and occasional accidental incursions. Since then, the Lebanese armed forces have taken a major part in the frey within Lebanon, and there have been jihadist attempts at invasion which have been repulsed by both the Army and Hezbullah.

== August 2014 battle of Arsal ==
- 2 August: Over a hundred fighters killed on both sides of the Lebanese Army and Syrian gunmen in clashes in Arsal. starting a new phase of the tragedy.

== September 2014 ==
- 19 September: An IED kills 2 Lebanese soldiers and injures 3 others in Arsal.
- 20 September: A car bomb is detonated a Hezbollah checkpoint in eastern Lebanon.
- 23 September: A Lebanese soldier is killed and 2 others injured by gunmen near Tripoli.
- 24 September: Over 200 people arrested in Lebanese army raids on Syrian refugee camps near Arsal, with protests ensuing the next day in the beleaguered town.

== October 2014 ==
- 5 October: clashes in eastern Lebanon killed 14 Syrian rebels and 3 Hezbollah fighters. Some sources said Hezbollah lost 8 fighters.
- 10 October: Syrian troops wound a Lebanese man on the Lebanese side of the border.
- 17 October: a Lebanese soldier was killed and others wounded in northern Lebanon. Later the Lebanese army arrested more than 40 Syrians.
- 23 October: 3 militants killed by the Lebanese army and a suspected terrorist arrested in northern Lebanon. The following day, 16 people including 7 Lebanese soldiers were wounded when gunmen attacked the Lebanese army in Tripoli.
- 25 October: two Lebanese soldiers were killed and a number of gunmen wounded in northern Lebanon. As of 25 October, the death toll has risen to 6 Lebanese soldiers and 2 civilians.
- 26 October: 4 other soldiers and 5 civilians were believed to be killed. At least 20 militants were killed and 150 people were injured.

== November 2014 ==
- 14 November: 3 soldiers were wounded by a bomb in Arsal.

== December 2014 ==
- 2 December: 6 soldiers were killed in an ambush in northeast Lebanon.
- 3 December: a Lebanese soldier was killed and 2 others wounded in an explosion in Arsal.

== January 2015 ==
- 10 January: Nine people were killed and more than 30 wounded in a Jabal Mohsen café when two suicide bombers from the area of Tripoli blew themselves up. It was the first suicide attack on a civilian neighbourhood in nearly a year, following a security sweep.
- 23 January: Five Lebanese soldiers were killed and 16 others wounded in clashes with ISIS fighters near the Syrian border.

== November 2015 ==
- 12 November: Two suicide bombers detonated explosives in Bourj el-Barajneh, a southern suburb of Beirut, Lebanon, that is inhabited mostly by Shia Muslims. Reports of the number of deaths range from 37 to 43.

== March 2016 ==
- 10 March: Lebanese army clash with militants, left 8 Jihadists and 1 soldier dead.
- 24 March: A Lebanese soldier is killed by a bombing in northern Lebanon. No group claimed responsibility.
- 27–28 March: 18 militants from Jabhat al-Nusra and 14 militants from ISIL are killed in clashes between the two groups in the northern Bekaa valley region which began on 27 March as Nusra tried to regain some positions it had lost to the ISIL. 6 more Nusra militants were taken prisoner.

== April 2016 ==
- 12 April: A car bomb exploded on Tuesday in Lebanon’s southern port city of Sidon, killing at least one person identified as a Palestinian official, a security source said. The source said the blast killed Fathi Zeidan, who headed the Fatah movement in the Miye Miye Palestinian refugee camp near Sidon.

== December 2016 ==
- 5 December: In Arsal have an Insurgent shoot one soldier dead.
- 28 December: In Al-Ain an explosion killed a local and 1 wounded.

== June 2017 ==
- 30 June: Five suicide bombings and a grenade attack targeting army personnel in Al-Nour camp and al-Qariyeh camp near Arsal, left seven soldiers wounded and a girl killed.

== June 2019 ==
- 3 June: A lone-wolf operative attacked Lebanese security personnel near Tripoli, killing 2 police and 2 soldiers. The attack occurred on June 3 by a gunman who had been in jail before on charges of belonging to ISIL.

== See also ==
- List of attacks in Lebanon
