= Michel Samaha =

Lebanese politician

Michel Fuad Samaha
- Born: 9 September 1948 (age 77); Jouar, Metn District, Lebanon
- Years active: 1960s – present
- Spouse: Gladys Samaha
- Children: Three daughters

Michel Samaha (Arabic: ميشال سماحة; born 9 September 1948) is a former minister of information and minister of tourism in Lebanon, and a longtime politician and intelligence operative. Samaha was known for his long and close relationship with the Ba'athist Syrian government, and was one of several Lebanese officials sanctioned by the United States in 2007 for allegedly "contributing to political and economic instability in Lebanon." In December 2012 Samaha was listed by the United States as a global terrorist under section 1(b) of Executive Order 13224.

Arrested and imprisoned in August, 2012, Samaha was convicted in May 2015 of transporting explosives into Lebanon and was sentenced to four and a half years in jail. He was released on bail in January 2016.

Samaha was sentenced again to 13 years with hard labour in April 2016 for attempting to carry out terrorist acts. In August 2022, he was finally released from jail after 10 years of prison.

== Early life and career ==
Samaha was born on 9 September 1948. He became a member of the Phalangist or Kataeb Party in 1964 when he was a student. He was elected head of the party's student body in the 1970s. After graduation, he was appointed by Amine Gemayel as his media advisor. Then he became the chairman of the board of Tele Liban. During the Lebanon civil war, he acted as a mediator between the party and Assad government. Samaha served as an advisor and envoy to Amine Gemayel during the latter's presidency from 1982 to 1988.

However, later he joined the Lebanese Forces (LF) faction led by Elie Hobeika. In 1985, he began to act as both a Lebanese political operator and a Syrian-French intelligence operative. He agreed to support the 1985 tripartite agreement between the LF represented by Hobeika, Nabih Berri’s Amal Movement, and Walid Jumblatt’s Progressive Socialist Party (PSP) on the eve of its signing. Samaha left the LF-controlled areas on 15 January 1986. LF was headed by Samir Geagea during this period.

Samaha was also the advisor and close ally of Syrian President Bashar al-Assad and the Assad family since the time of late President Hafez al-Assad. Samaha served as the advisor of Bashar al-Assad in regard to his public relations in Europe. Samaha had close ties with the French, Canadian, and US governments and assumed secret diplomatic and security roles.

When his close friend Elias Hrawi became president whose term lasted from 1989 to 1998, Samaha was made by him the information minister in 1992, then tourism minister for six months, then information minister again from 1992 to 1995. Samaha won the Catholic parliamentary seat in North Metn in 1992 after the Taif agreement became effective. However, he lost it in the 1996 and 2000 elections. Then prime minister Rafik Hariri appointed him information minister in 2003. This appointment was made during the term of president Emile Lahoud whose tenure lasted from 1998 to 2007.

After the 2000 elections, Samaha involved in the establishment of the Movement for Democratic Renewal. However, in 2002, he allied himself with the pro-Syrian political camp in Lebanon. Just before his arrest in August 2012, he was a member of Omar Karami’s pro-Syrian movement, the National Gathering.

== Arrest ==
Samaha was arrested on 9 August 2012 for his alleged involvement in transporting explosives into Lebanon, with the help of the Syrian Security Chief Ali Mamlouk, to carry out terrorist attacks in order to incite sectarian strife and destabilize the country. Samaha allegedly confessed on 10 August to the Internal Security Forces Information Branch that Syrian President Bashar al-Assad wanted bomb attacks in Lebanon. Najib Mikati, the Lebanese Prime Minister, stated in September 2012 that Samaha admitted his involvement of plotting terror attacks in Lebanon. According to leaked interrogation transcripts, Samaha allegedly suggested that the planned bombings were meant to target Lebanese Christian leaders in order to raise sectarian tensions.

The intelligence branch of the Lebanese Internal Security Forces (ISF), headed by Wissam al-Hassan who was assassinated on 19 October 2012, played a central role in Samaha's arrest. Samir Geagea argued that al-Hassan was assassinated due to his involvement in the arrest of Samaha.

=== Release ===
On 14 January 2016, Samaha was released on bail. In August 2022, he was finally released from jail after 10 years of prison.

=== US designation as global terrorist ===
On 17 December 2012, the US government designated Samaha a "global terrorist" for helping the Syrian government, led by President Bashar al-Assad, launch attacks in Lebanon. In addition, the US Treasury announced that economic sanctions on him were in effect, freezing any assets he owns under US jurisdiction and forbidding US citizens from doing business with him.

== Personal life ==
Samaha is a Melkite Catholic, and holds dual citizenship, both Lebanese and Canadian. He is married to Gladys Samaha and has three daughters.
