= Hadath (disambiguation) =

Hadath or Al Hadath (a definite article in Arabic) may refer to:

== Places ==
Turkey

- Hadath, full name Al-Ḥadath al-Ḥamrā', also known as Adata in Greek, a medieval fortress town near the Taurus Mountains in Cilicia, (modern southeastern Turkey), which played an important role in the Byzantine–Arab Wars

Lebanon

- Hadath, Mount Lebanon, a municipality in the Baabda District of the Mount Lebanon Governorate in Lebanon
- Hadath, Beqaa, town in the Beqaa Governorate of Lebanon
- Hadath El Jebbeh, a Lebanese town in the Bsharri District in the North Governorate of Lebanon

== Religion ==
- Hadath (West Syrian Diocese), an ancient diocese of the Syriac Orthodox Church in the Malatya region (present-day Turkey), attested between the eighth and eleventh centuries and based in town of Hadath above.
- Hadath akbar, a form of major ritual impurity in Islam
- Ḥadath aṣghar, a minor ritual impurity in Islam

== Others ==
- Al-Hadath, an Arabic daily newspaper in Amman, Jordan
