= Jürgen Cain Külbel =

Jürgen Cain Külbel is a German former criminal investigator of the GDR, who became an investigative journalist after the reunification of Germany.

Born in Thuringia in 1956, Külbel graduated from the Humboldt University of Berlin in 1979 with a degree in criminal investigation and worked in the field for 11 years. He also organised a karate championship in the GDR, before becoming a journalist.

Külbel has worked with the Voltaire Network and writes analyses of Middle Eastern issues. He came to international attention after publishing a counter-investigation on the assassination of former Lebanese prime minister Rafik Hariri, accusing Israel and the Mossad of orchestrating Hariri's murder. He wrote a book, Mordakte Hariri, about the case. In 2008 he was jailed in Berlin for breaching a court order by linking to Stasi documents in connection with his investigation.
