= Btouratige =

Village in Koura, Lebanon

Coordinates: 34.3629°N 35.8350°E

Btouratige بتوراتج
- Village
- Location within Lebanon
- Country: Lebanon
- Governorate: North
- District: Koura

Btouratij (Arabic: بتوراتج, romanized: Btūrātij), also spelled Btouratige, is a village in Koura District of Lebanon. In 1953, Btouratij had a population of 289 living in 32 households.

It was the residence of the murdered Lebanese security official Wissam al-Hassan.

== Demographics ==
In 2014, Muslims made up 99.28% of registered voters in Btouratij. 98.21% of the voters were Sunni Muslims.
