= Saleh al Aridi =

Saleh Al Aridi
- Born: Saleh Farhan Al Aridi; 5 February 1957; Baissour, Aley District, Lebanon
- Died: 10 September 2008 (aged 51); Baissour, Lebanon
- Parent: Abu Saleh Farhan Aridi

Saleh Farhan Al Aridi (Arabic: صالح العريضي) (1957 - 10 September 2008) was a Lebanese Druze politician. A leader and one of the founders of the Lebanese Democratic Party (LDP), headed by Prince Talal Arslan, his father's, Sheikh Abu Saleh Farhan Aridi, a senior sheikh of the spiritual authority of elders Druze. Aridi was killed in a car bomb attack near his house in his village Baissour, located in the Aley District of Mount Lebanon.

== Political background ==
Aridi emphasized close relations with Syria and was a close adviser and right hand for Prince Talal Arslan, head of the LDP. He helped bridge differences within the Lebanese Druze community during the 2008 conflict in Lebanon, specially between Emir Talal Arslan and Walid Jumblatt also Aridi had been trying to reconcile rival factions within Lebanese parties, Aridi was a key middleman between the two sides and helped mediate an end to the fighting between Hezbollah under Hassan Nasrallah and the Progressive Socialist Party under Walid Jumblatt in the country.

== Assassination ==
He was assassinated at his house in Baissour, in an attack that also injured six others on 10 September 2008. A security official reported that the bomb, made of 700 grams of explosives, was placed under his car.

It was a historical stand for his father, Sheikh Abu Saleh Farhan Aridi, who said at the moment of the crime: "If our opponent came to us at this moment and said that he killed Saleh, I will forgive him and will not accept anyone to touch or harm him." A huge funeral was held for Aridi on 12 September 2008 and was attended by all different and opponent Lebanese parties, and the Lebanese President Michel Suleiman named Aridi "The Martyr of National Unity." He was buried on the same day in the village's cemetery.

=== Reaction ===
The Foreign Ministry of Syria said: "Syria firmly denounces the criminal and terrorist act which claimed the life of Saleh Aridi. Syria is convinced that such crimes that target security and stability in Lebanon will not achieve their objectives."

The United States State Department spokesman Sean McCormack also condemned the car bombing assassination. He added: "The United States is deeply concerned about the latest violence in Lebanon. Our support for the Lebanese government and its democratic institutions is unwavering. "This support is a reflection of our unshakable commitment to the Lebanese people and their hope for democratic change and economic prosperity."

The European Union presidency issued a report, indicating that it "very strongly condemns the attack which cost the life of Mr. Saleh Aridi, and stressed their readiness to provide assistance until the perpetrators of terrorist acts to justice, and advised the parties concerned to continue the process that started the Doha agreement to end the persistent political crisis in Lebanon."

== See also ==
- 2008 conflict in Lebanon
- List of assassinated Lebanese politicians
- List of attacks in Lebanon
