= Internal Security Forces =

National police and security force of Lebanon

Internal Security Forces Forces de sécurité intérieure قوى الأمن الداخلي Qiwa al-Amn al-Dakhili
- Logo of the Lebanese ISF.
- Abbreviation: ISF
- Motto: Security for the Nation and Civilians

Agency overview
- Formed: 1860
- Employees: 131,000

Jurisdictional structure
- Operations jurisdiction: Lebanon
- General nature: Gendarmerie
- Specialist jurisdiction: Paramilitary law enforcement, counter insurgency, riot control

Operational structure
- Headquarters: Beirut
- Agency executives: Major General Rayed Abdullah, Commander; Brigadier General Naim Chammas, Chief of Staff

Notables
- People: Cpt. Wissam Eid †; Brig. Gen. Wissam al-Hassan †

Website
- isf.gov.lb

The Internal Security Forces (Arabic: المديرية العامة لقوى الأمن الداخلي, romanized: al-Mudiriyya al-'aamma li-Qiwa al-Amn al-Dakhili; French: Forces de Sécurité Intérieure; abbreviated ISF) are the national police and gendarmerie of Lebanon.

Modern police were established in Lebanon in 1861, with the creation of a gendarmerie force. In April 2005, Ashraf Rifi became head of the ISF, replacing Ali Al Hajj. Rifi then started to recruit younger members to become part of Lebanese Intelligence. His term ended in April 2013, and he was replaced by Roger Salem, and Ibrahim Basbouss subsequently. On March 8, 2017, the Lebanese Cabinet appointed Imad Othman as the ISF director general. He took command the following day.

The number of ISF personnel reached 100,000 by 2000 and grew to over 131,000 by 2013. The ISF National Day in Lebanon is on the 9th of June.

== Missions ==
Their missions include :

- Maintaining public order.
- Highway patrol.
- Counter-terrorism.

== Organization ==
The ISF organization includes:

- The Ministry of the interior
- Inspector-General
- Directorate General of Internal Security Forces
  - Staff
  - Territorial Gendarmerie
  - Mobile Gendarmerie
  - Judicial Police
  - Central Administration
  - Beirut Police
  - ISF Institute
  - Social Services
  - Commander of the Security of Embassies and Public Administration

== Elite Forces ==
Three Special Forces Teams operate in the ISF.

1. Special Operations Group-Judicial Police.
  It consists of SWAT unit and BRI unit.
2. Strike Force - Information Department.
3. Black Panthers - Mobile Forces

== Directors ==
List of General Directors of ISF:

- Raed Abdallah, Major General, ISF General Director from 2025
- Imad Othman, Major General, ISF General Director from 2017 to 2025
- Ibrahim Basbous, Major General, ISF General Director from 2013 to 2017
- Ashraf Rifi, Major General, ISF General Director from 2005 to 2013
- Ali Al Hajj, Major General, ISF General Director from 2004 to 2005
- Marouan Zein, Major General, ISF General Director from 2001 to 2004
- Abed El Karim Ibrahim, Major General, ISF General Director from 1998 to 2001
- Rafic El Hassan, Major General, ISF General Director from 1993 to 1998
- Mohammad Salim Kobrosly, Major General, ISF General Director from 1990 to 1993
- Omar Makhzoumi, Major General, ISF General Director from 1987 to 1990
- Osman Osman, Major General, ISF General Director from 1983 to 1987
- Hicham El Chaar, Civilian, ISF General Director from 1982 to 1983
- Ahmad El Hajj, Major General (Army), ISF General Director from 1977 to 1982
- Hicham El Chaar, Civilian, ISF General Director from 1971 to 1977
- Mahmoud Hafez, Civilian, ISF General Director from 1970 to 1971
- Mahmoud El Banna, Civilian, ISF General Director from 1964 to 1970
- Jamil El Hosami, Leader (Army), ISF General Director from 1962 to 1964
- Nureddine Rifai, Leader, ISF General Director from 1959 to 1962

== See also ==
- General Security Directorate (Lebanon)
- Lebanese Air Force
- Lebanese Armed Forces
- Lebanese Navy

Military offices
Preceded by Roger Salem	Ibrahim Basbouss	Succeeded by Imad Othman
