= Wissam al-Hassan =

Lebanese security official (1965–2012)

- وسام الحسن

Personal details
- Born: 11 April 1965 Btouratige, Koura District, Lebanon
- Died: 19 October 2012 (aged 47) Achrafieh, Beirut, Lebanon
- Cause of death: Assassinated
- Spouse: Anna al-Hassan
- Children: Majd; Mazen
- Occupation: Chief of Information Branch

Military service
- Allegiance: Lebanon
- Branch/service: Internal Security Forces
- Rank: Brigadier general

Wissam Adnan al-Hassan (Arabic: وسام عدنان الحسن, romanized: Wisām ‘Adnān al-Ḥasan; 11 April 1965 – 19 October 2012) was a brigadier general at the Lebanese Internal Security Forces (ISF) and the head of its intelligence-oriented Information Branch. Seen as a leading Sunni figure in Lebanon, he was also a key player in the opposition March 14 alliance without having a political position.

== Early life ==
Al-Hassan was born into a Sunni family in the northern Lebanese city of Btouratige, Koura District, Lebanon, on 11 April 1965. However, the UN report cites his birthplace as Tripoli.

From 1992 to 1995 al-Hassan was an official guard of the late Lebanese Prime Minister Rafik Hariri. During this period, he was an internal security officer under Ali Al Hajj. In 1995, he was appointed as Hariri's chief of protocol and served in his post until 1998. Then he was named as the head of the Hariri office (1998 - 2000). He worked as Hariri's head guard detachment from June 2001 to Summer 2004, and also, promoted to the rank of lieutenant colonel in this period. He began to work for Saad Hariri as head of his office from 2004 to January 2006, and resigned from the ISF during this period.

== Rafik Hariri Assassination ==
Rafik Hariri was killed in a massive car bomb in Beirut on 14 February 2005. As Hariri's chief of protocol, al-Hassan would have normally been in the motorcade that was hit by the attack, but he had taken the day off to undergo a university exam.

In 2010, the U.N. investigators from the Special Tribunal for Lebanon suspected that al-Hassan was involved in the assassination of Hariri and recommended that he warranted a further detailed investigation, since they considered his alibi to be "weak and inconsistent." However, Hariri's son, Saad Hariri, said he had always had full confidence in al-Hassan. Al-Hassan was not among those indicted by the tribunal in January 2011. The tribunal's prosecutors are instead seeking the arrest of four members of the pro-Syrian Shia Muslim group Hezbollah.

== Head of information branch at ISF ==
Al-Hassan was named as the head of the information branch of the ISF on 19 January 2006, and tasked with leading the investigation to Hariri's death. Al-Hassan served under the ISF's director-general, Ashraf Rifi, who is one of the board members of the Prince Nayef University for Security Studies. Al-Hassan achieved significant improvements in the capabilities of the information branch in terms of both domestic criminal matters and security issues.

His intelligence unit was seen as being backed by the March 14 alliance, acting as a counterweight to the Lebanese Armed Forces's intelligence unit that is considered to have close links to Syria. The members of his organization have been subject of repeated assassinations and assassination attempts. One of the information branch's tasks was dismantling the network of Israeli spies in Lebanon, and this led to the arrest of over 100 individuals suspected of collaborating with Israel.

As the chief of the intelligence branch, al-Hassan was criticized by members of the March 8 Alliance for allegedly focusing his investigations on pro-Syrian figures and members of the March 8 Alliance. In August 2012, al-Hassan made headlines as the key player in an investigation that led to the arrest of former information minister Michel Samaha, who was charged with transporting explosives into Lebanon with the help of the Syrian Security Chief Ali Mamlouk, in an alleged attempt to destabilize the country. Al-Hassan had evidence of direct links between Samaha and senior Syrian political and intelligence aides, including top adviser to President Assad, Butheina Shaban. Lebanese Interior Minister Marwan Charbel reported that al-Hassan was threatened in relation to the arrest of Samaha. Colonel Imad Othman succeeded al-Hassan as the head of ISF's intelligence bureau on 21 October 2012.

== Political activities ==
Al-Hassan acted as a mediator between Saad Hariri and Hezbollah. In addition, al-Hassan supported the Syrian opposition in the Syrian civil war as it is alleged that he facilitated the flow of money and arms from the Gulf states and the West to the Syrian opposition through Lebanon. Although al-Hassan was not directly involved in operations, his actions permitted the smuggling of arms destined for opposition forces from Lebanon to Syria, provided a safe haven for Syrian defectors in Lebanon, and resulted in the Syrian opposition using bases in Lebanon as staging areas for attacks into Syria.

Al-Hassan was named as a possible negotiation partner by the Free Syrian Army after the Syrian insurgency fighters kidnapped 11 Lebanese Shi'a pilgrims in August. Al-Hassan was considered an ally of the United States.

== Death and funeral ==
On 19 October 2012, al-Hassan died in a massive car bombing near the Achrafieh neighborhood of Beirut. Seven other people including his driver also died and nearly eighty people were wounded in the huge blast. Al-Hassan is believed to have been the target of the attack for his part in the investigations about Hariri's assassination by Hezbollah. Later his assassination was linked to Unit 121 that is responsible of several politic assassinations since the late 80's. He returned to Beirut from abroad on 18 October 2012.

A state funeral ceremony for him was organized in Beirut on 21 October with the attendance of significant political figures and thousands of people. Lebanese president Michel Suleiman awarded al-Hassan the National Order of the Cedar in Grade of Grand Officer at the ceremony. Al-Hassan was buried alongside former Prime Minister Rafik Hariri in a cemetery near the Mohammad Al-Amin Mosque.

== Personal life ==
Al-Hassan was married to Anna al-Hassan and had two sons, Majd and Mazen.

== See also ==
- Future Movement
- Lebanese–Syrian Security Apparatus
- 2011–2012 conflict in Lebanon
- Lebanese Information Branch
- List of assassinated Lebanese politicians
