= Al-Mourabitoun =

Independent Nasserite Movement (Al-Mourabitoun) حركة الناصريين المستقلين-المرابطون
- The movement's emblem with the slogan: What is taken by force can only be recovered by force.
- Abbreviation: INM
- Leader: Mustafa Hamdan
- Founder: Ibrahim Kulaylat
- Founded: 1957
- Headquarters: Beirut
- Ideology: Arab nationalism Nasserism; Anti-imperialism; Pan-Arabism; Arab socialism
- Political position: Left-wing

Party flag

Website
- www.almourabitoun.com

The Independent Nasserite Movement – INM (Arabic: حركة الناصريين المستقلين-المرابطون, romanized: Ḥarakat al-Nāṣiriyīn al-Mustaqillīn) or simply Al-Murabitoun (المرابطون lit. The Steadfast), also termed variously Independent Nasserite Organization (INO) or Movement of Independent Nasserists (MIN), is a Nasserist political party in Lebanon.

== Name ==
Initially, the Movement of Independent Nasserists was the name of the political organization, whilst "al-Murabitoun" designated their militia forces. However, this distinction between political and military wings became blurred over time (and the militia has been subsequently abolished), "the Sentinels", but also meaning "Guardians" or "Saviours" – carries historical Islamic connotations (see Almoravids).

== Origins ==
Founded in 1957 at Beirut by a group of Lebanese Nasserite activists led by Ibrahim Kulaylat who opposed the pro-Western policies of President Camille Chamoun, the INM came to prominence at the height of the 1958 Civil War. The Movement’s own 2,000-strong militia, ‘The Sentinels’ (Arabic: Al-Murabitun, al-murabitûn or al-Mourabitoun), clashed with the Lebanese Army and pro-government Christian militias in northern Lebanon and Beirut.

Despite experiencing a temporary decline in the years immediately after the 1958 crisis, the INM remained an active force in Lebanese politics throughout the 1960s and 1970s. At the beginning of the 1970s, the Movement re-emerged as a major political faction within the Sunni Muslim community, forging alliances with other anti-establishment leftist parties such as the Progressive Socialist Party (PSP) led by Kamal Jumblatt and the Lebanese Communist Party (LCP). In 1969 the INM became a member of the "Front for Progressive Parties and National Forces" (FPPNF), later reorganized in 1972 as the Lebanese National Movement (LNM). Consistent with its Pan-Arab ideals, the radical INM was a staunch advocate of the Palestinian cause in Lebanon since the late 1960s, cultivating close political and military ties with the Palestine Liberation Organization (PLO) in the immediate pre-war years.

== Political beliefs ==
As its name implies, the INM espoused the ideals of the late Egyptian President, Gamal Abdel Nasser, a blend of Socialism and secular pan-Arab nationalism, expressed on his party slogan 'Freedom – Unity – Socialism' (Arabic: الحرية - الوحدة - الاشتراكية | al-Hurriyat – al-Wahdat – al-Aishtirakia). Being radically opposed to the Christian Maronite-dominated political order in Lebanon, the political goals of al-Murabitoun were to preserve the Arab and secular character of Lebanon and, in the long-term, establish a socialist political and economic system. The INM presented itself as being pragmatic in ideological terms however, and that its doctrine was based upon a fusion between materialist Marxist and liberal idealist theories. In 1979, leading party cadre Samir Sabbagh described the INM as particularly close to the Lebanese Communist Party (LCP).

== Following ==
Although the INM claimed to be a secular, non-sectarian movement, its membership has always been overwhelmingly Muslim, being perceived within Lebanon as a predominantly Sunni organization. During the Movement's resurgence in the early 1970s, it drew its support largely from working class’ and impoverished petty bourgeoisie Sunnis, but this did not prevent them of attracting followers from other sects. Indeed, a 1987 report used by the U.S. Library of Congress study on Lebanon estimated the INM membership since the mid-1970s to be about 45% Sunni, 45% Shia and 10% Druze, although other unconfirmed sources present the remaining 40% as Christians. Geographically, the movement had its epicentre in the Sunni areas of Beirut.

== Military structure and organization ==
Al-Mourabitoun Forces/قوات المرابطون Sentinels/المرابطون
- Al-Mourabitoun Forces flag (1957–1985)
- Leaders: Ibrahim Kulaylat; Shawqi Majed
- Dates active: 1957–1958; 1975–1985
- Headquarters: Tarik al-Jadida, Mazraa (Beirut)
- Size: 3,000–5,000 fighters
- Part of: Lebanese National Movement

Quietly re-formed in early 1975, their "Sentinels" militia, now known as the Al-Mourabitoun Forces (Arabic: قوات المرابطون | Quwwat al-Murabitun), started with just 150–200 poorly armed militants, but it subsequently grew to 3,000–5,000 men and women drawn from the Muslim quarters of West Beirut placed under the command of Kulaylat himself. Headquartered at the Tarik al-Jadida quarter of the Corniche El-Mazraa commercial district in West Beirut, the INM/al-Mourabitoun in the early 1980s numbered some 1,000 regular fighters and 2,000 reservists secretly trained by the Palestinian factions (Fatah, PFLP and As-Saiqa) and later by Lieutenant Ahmed Al-Khatib's Lebanese Arab Army. Since its foundation the militia quickly attained a 'regular' outlook, attested by the high discipline and organization of its 3,000 uniformed militiamen into conventional branches of Armor, Infantry and Artillery, backed by Medical, Signals and Military Police support units. Whilst Druze, Sunni and Shia Muslims filled the rank-and-file, its officer corps was staffed mostly by Sunnis and a few Christians trained in Libya and Iraq.

=== Units ===
- the "Hawks of az-Zeidaniyya" (Arabic: صقور الزيدانية | Suqūr az-Zaydānīya)
- the "Maarouf Saad Units and the Determination brigade" (Arabic: وحدات معروف سعد ولواء تقرير | Merouf Maeruf Wahadat wa Liwa' Taqrir)

=== List of Al-Mourabitoun Forces commanders ===
- Ibrahim Kulaylat
- Shawqi Majed

=== Weapons and equipment ===
Most of the INM/Al-Mourabitoun's own weapons and equipment were provided by the PLO, Libya, Egypt, Iraq and Syria or pilfered from Lebanese Armed Forces (LAF) barracks and Internal Security Forces (ISF) police stations. Additional weaponry, vehicles and other, non-lethal military equipments were procured in the international black market.

==== Small-arms ====
Al-Mourabitoun militiamen were provided with a variety of small-arms, including MAS-36, Lee–Enfield SMLE Mk III, Mosin–Nagant and Mauser Karabiner 98k bolt-action rifles, MAT-49, Sa 25/26 and Crvena Zastava Automat M56 submachine guns, M2 carbines, M1 Garand (or its Italian-produced copy, the Beretta Model 1952), Beretta BM 59 and SKS semi-automatic rifles, FN FAL, M16A1, Heckler & Koch G3, Vz. 58, AK-47 and AKM assault rifles (other variants included the Zastava M70, Chinese Type 56, Romanian Pistol Mitralieră model 1963/1965, Bulgarian AKK/AKKS and former East German MPi-KMS-72 assault rifles).

Several models of handguns were also used, including Colt Single Action Army second generation revolvers, Tokarev TT-33, Makarov PM, CZ 75, M1911A1, FN P35 and MAB PA-15 pistols. Squad weapons consisted of DP-28, Chatellerault FM Mle 1924/29, MG 34, M1918A2 BAR, Bren, AA-52, RPK, RPD, PK/PKM, FN MAG and M60 light machine guns, with heavier Browning M1919A4 .30 Cal, Browning M2HB .50 Cal, SG-43/SGM Goryunov and DShKM machine guns being employed as platoon and company weapons. Heckler & Koch G3A3 assault rifles equipped with telescopic sights were used for sniping.

Grenade launchers and portable anti-tank weapons consisted of M203, M72 LAW, RPG-2 and RPG-7 rocket launchers, whilst crew-served and indirect fire weapons included M2 60mm mortars, 82-PM-41 82mm mortars and 120-PM-43 (M-1943) 120mm heavy mortars, plus Type 36 57mm (Chinese-produced version of the shoulder-fired US M18 recoilless rifle), Type 56 75mm (Chinese variant of the US M20 recoilless rifle), B-10 82mm, B-11 107mm and M40A1 106mm recoilless rifles (often mounted on technicals). Soviet PTRS-41 14.5mm anti-tank rifles were used for heavy sniping.

==== Armoured and transport vehicles ====
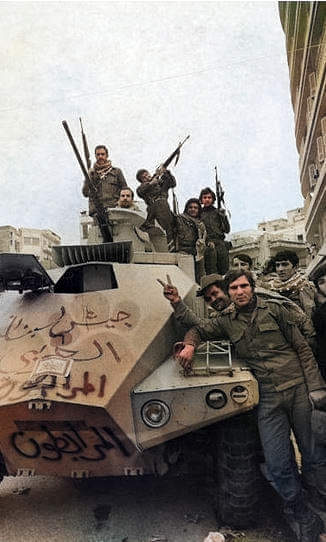
Al-Mourabitoun militiamen and allied Lebanese Arab Army (LAA) soldiers gather around a captured Panhard M3 VTT Armoured personnel carrier (APC) parked in front of the Lebanese Arab radio station building in west Beirut, c.1976.

Created in February 1976, the Al-Mourabitoun's early armored corps initially fielded two obsolescent Sherman Firefly Mk Vc medium tanks, a few Charioteer tanks, M113 and Panhard M3 VTT armored personnel carriers (APC), M42 Duster SPAAGs, Cadillac Gage V-100 Commando, Panhard AML-90 and Staghound armoured cars seized from the Lebanese Army and the Internal Security Forces, backed by Gun trucks and technicals. The latter consisted of commandeered Austin Champ, US M151A1/A2, Willys M38A1 MD (or its civilian version, the Jeep CJ-5) and Kaiser M715 jeeps, GAZ-69A, Land-Rover series II-III, Toyota Land Cruiser (J40), Toyota Land Cruiser (J45), GMC K25 Sierra, Chevrolet C-10/C-15 Cheyenne light pickup trucks, and Chevrolet C/K 3rd generation pickup trucks, plus Mercedes-Benz Unimog 416 light trucks, GMC K1500 medium-duty trucks, GMC C4500 medium-duty trucks and ZIL-151 General purpose trucks armed with heavy machine guns, recoilless rifles and Anti-Aircraft autocannons.

For logistical support, the INM militia relied on Toyota Land Cruiser (J42) hardtop, Toyota Land Cruiser (J45) and Jeep Gladiator J20 light pickups, Pinzgauer 712M light all-terrain vehicles, Volkswagen Type 2 Transporter Pickups, Chevrolet C-50 medium-duty, Dodge F600 medium-duty and GMC C4500 medium-duty trucks, and GMC C7500 heavy-duty trucks. Modified Peugeot 504 pickup trucks were used as military ambulances.

Their armored corps was later expanded in October 1982 following the departure of PLO regular forces from West Beirut. INM militia forces were able to salvage a number of BRDM-2 amphibious armoured scout cars, ten Soviet-made T-34/85 medium tanks, five BTR-152 wheeled APCs, two or three ZSU-23-4M1 Shilka SPAAG tracked vehicles and a few T-34T Armoured Recovery Vehicles. It is rumoured that the INM militia forces also captured one Magach 3 MBT from the IDF earlier in September 1982, though it remains unclear if this particular vehicle was taken into their service or was simply returned to its previous owners.

==== Artillery ====
In addition, the seizure of some ex-PLO artillery pieces, namely obsolete Soviet ZiS-2 57mm and ZiS-3 76.2mm anti-tank guns, M1938 (M-30) 122mm howitzers and Type 59-1 130mm field guns, plus towed Type 63 107mm and five truck-mounted BM-11 122mm and BM-21 Grad 122mm MBRLs which allowed them to strengthen their own artillery corps. British Bofors 40mm L/60 anti-aircraft guns, Yugoslav Zastava M55 20mm, Soviet ZPU (ZPU-1, ZPU-2, ZPU-4) 14.5mm and ZU-23-2 23mm AA autocannons (mounted on technicals, ZIL-151 trucks and M113 and BTR-152 APCs) were employed in both air defense and direct fire supporting roles. In addition to AA guns and autocannons, the INM/Al-Murabitoun received either from Syria or the PLO a number of man-portable, shoulder-launched Soviet SA-7 Grail surface-to-air (SAM) missiles, which they employed against Israeli Air Force (IAF) fighter-bomber jets during the 1982 Lebanon War.

== Activities ==
Stubborn and determined fighters, adept at employing guerrilla tactics in urban areas, the INM/al-Mourabitoun operated mainly within West Beirut, controlling by the mid-1980s the important Mahallat Abu Shaker, Wadi Abu Jamil, Hamra, Corniche El-Mazraa, Corniche El-Manara, Bashoura, Basta El-Tahta, Chyah and Ras Beirut districts and quarters. They also operated two clandestine ports located at Ouza'i district and at the Ain El-Mreisseh waterfront sector of the Lebanese capital, which were used primarily for arms-smuggling in collusion with the Sidon-based Popular Nasserist Organization (PNO). A third illegal port located at the Karantina dock area in East Beirut was briefly held by the INM since November 1975, until being forced out by the Christian militias on January 18, 1976.

Like other Lebanese factions, the INM operated its own media services. A radio station was set up in 1975, the "Voice of Arab Lebanon" (Arabic: Iza'at Sawt Lubnan al-Arabi), followed in 1982 by a television station, the "Television of Arab Lebanon" (Arabic: Televizyon Lubnan al-Arabi), their broadcasting facilities being allocated at the Mahallat Abu Shaker Party headquarters' offices near the Gamal Abdel Nasser Mosque.

They also had a medical relief agency, designated the Lebanese Red Crescent Association (Arabic: جمعية الهلال الأحمر اللبناني | Jameiat al-Hilal al-Ahmar al-Lubnaniyya), best known as Al-hilal for short.

== The Al-Mourabitoun in the Lebanese Civil War ==
=== Ascendancy 1975–76 ===
When the Lebanese Civil War broke out in April 1975, as a member of the LNM the INM/Al-Mourabitoun was an active founder of its military wing, the Joint Forces (LNM-JF). The movement claimed that was the first amongst the Lebanese "progressive" militias during the war, and by 1977 it was the largest organization within the LNM-JF, both in terms of popular support and military capacity.

During the 1975-77 phase of the Lebanese Civil War, the al-Mourabitoun militia forces were heavily committed in several battles and suffered considerable casualties, especially at the Battle of the Hotels in October 1975 where they engaged Christian Kataeb Regulatory Forces and Tigers Militia fighters, and later at the 'Spring Offensive' held against East Beirut and Mount Lebanon in March 1976. They also took part on January 20 of that same year in the violent (and controversial) sieges of the Christian towns of Es-Saadiyat, Damour, and Jiyeh in the Iqlim al-Kharrub, on the side of PLO and Palestine Liberation Army (PLA) units to avenge the earlier Tel al-Zaatar massacre by the Lebanese Front militias.

=== Reversals 1976–82 ===
The Syrian military intervention of June 1976 – which the INM/al-Mourabitoun initially strongly opposed, even fighting the Syrian Army at the Battle of Bhamdoun in the Aley District, but gradually came to terms with it – and the slow decline of the Movement's political role at the beginning of the 1980s, caused their influence within the Sunni community to wane, losing in the end its final base of support amongst the political and intellectual elites.

Towards the end of the 1970s heavy casualties and their involvement in atrocities against non-Muslims caused the number of militants from other sects in the ranks to drop sharply, a situation further aggrieved by internal splits that occurred at the early 1980s. This led a significant number of prominent Sunnis – such as the jurist Walid Eido and the activist Samir Sabbagh – to leave the INM leadership board to set up their own organizations, and thereby the Movement became an exclusively Sunni Muslim force. Relations with its Lebanese coalition partners were also strained to the point of the al-Mourabitoun battling rival Nasserite parties such as the Nasserite Correctionist Movement (NCM) in November 1975 over control of the Karantina district in East Beirut, later fighting the Syrian Social Nationalist Party (SSNP) factions in 1980–81 for the possession of certain West Beirut quarters.

Nevertheless, the al-Mourabitoun did not lost its military capabilities, and during the June 1982 Israeli invasion of Lebanon, they helped the PLO in the defense of the southwestern outskirts of the Lebanese Capital from IDF attacks until the end of the siege in September of that year. The 1982 Israeli Judicial inquiry into events in Beirut estimated that the strength of the al-Mourabitoun in West Beirut was 7,000 fighters.

=== Decline and demise 1983–88 ===
On January 29, 1983, the Israeli-run Front for the Liberation of Lebanon from Foreigners (FLLF) detonated a car-bomb close to the Fatah HQ at Chtaura, and another in West Beirut, close to the HQ of the INM/al-Mourabitoun. Some sixty people were killed and hundreds wounded.

Ibrahim Kulaylat emerged from the wreck of the LNM and the Palestinian withdrawal as the dominant Sunni leader, though he opted not to join the LNRF/Jammoul nor the pro-Syrian LNSF alliances in the mid-1980s, and consequently the political influence of the INM/al-Murabitoun had waned significantly. The Movement initially waged its own guerrilla war at the Beirut area against Israeli forces, but later fought in a more conventional fashion at the 1983–84 Mountain War allied with the Druze PSP/PLA, the LCP/Popular Guard and SSNP in the Chouf District against the Christian Lebanese Forces (LF) and the Lebanese Army. Later during the Coastal War in March–April 1985, the Al-Mourabitoun joined in a Syrian-backed coalition with the Popular Nasserist Organization (PNO), the Druze PSP/PLA and the Shi'ite Amal Movement, which defeated the Christian Lebanese Forces (LF) attempts to establish bridgeheads at Damour and Sidon.

This alliance was short-lived, however, and in March 1985, the Druze PSP/PLA stormed and seized the Al-Mourabitoun facilities in West Beirut, including their Party' Headquarters and their radio and television studios. When the War of the Camps broke out in April that year at West Beirut, it saw the Al-Mourabitoun allied with the PLO, the Nasserite Sixth of February Movement, the Communist Action Organization in Lebanon (OCAL), and the Kurdish Democratic Party – Lebanon (KDP-L) pitted against a powerful coalition of Shia Amal movement, pro-Syrian SSNP-L, the Lebanese Army, and anti-Arafat dissident Palestinian guerrilla factions of the Palestinian National Salvation Front backed by Syria. Eventually, the al-Murabitoun was crushed after a week of brutal fighting, and ceased to exist as a significant fighting force. Following its defeat, the movement lost many of its Shia foot-soldiers and members, becoming an almost exclusively Sunni Muslim militia.

Deprived from its own military wing, the weakened INM went underground again for the remainder of the war and gradually withered away, forcing Ibrahim Kulaylat to flee the Country in 1986 to seek political asylum in Switzerland. Some remnants of the Al-Mourabitoun, however, remained at large in West Beirut, waging a fierce guerrilla war against the Syrian Army until February 1987, only to be brutally suppressed in the 1987–88 anti-militia sweeps carried out jointly by Syrian Commando troops and the Lebanese Internal Security Forces (ISF).

=== The post-war years ===
After a long period of inactivity throughout the 1990s, the INM finally returned to the spotlight in April 2001, when they announced in a press conference held in Beirut their official comeback to Lebanese domestic politics. In 2006 it re-opened offices in Beirut, the North (Tripoli and the Akkar), the Beqaa Valley and the South (Jabal Amel). Since 2009, the movement has been led by Kulaylat's nephew and retired army general, Mustafa Hamdan.

== In popular culture ==
Al-Mourabitoun fighters are featured on 1970s archived TV news footage in the episode of the 2018 Al Jazeera English War Hotels documentary series dedicated to the Holiday Inn Hotel in west Beirut.

== See also ==
- Arab Socialist Union (Lebanon)
- Coastal War
- Lebanese Civil War
- Lebanese Communist Party
- Lebanese National Movement
- List of extrajudicial killings and political violence in Lebanon
- List of weapons of the Lebanese Civil War
- People's Liberation Army (Lebanon)
- Popular Guard
- Popular Nasserist Organization
- Progressive Socialist Party
- Sixth of February Movement
- Nasserism
- War of the Camps
- 6th Infantry Brigade (Lebanon)
- 8th Infantry Brigade (Lebanon)
