= Ali Al Hajj =

Lebanese Army general (born 1955)

- Born: Ali Al Hajj; 1955 (age 70–71)
- Occupation: Security officer
- Spouse: Samar Al Hajj
- Children: 2
- Military career
- Rank: Major general

Ali Al Hajj (Arabic: علي الحاج; born 1955) is a former major general and ex-director general of the Lebanese Internal Security Forces.

== Early life ==
Hajj was born into a Muslim Sunni family based in northern Lebanon in 1955.

== Career ==
Hajj was in charge of government protection for Rafik Hariri from 1992 to 1998. He was removed from his post when Hariri discovered Hajj was also working for Syrian intelligence. He was appointed the director general of the Lebanese internal security forces in 2004 by Interior Minister Suleiman Frangieh. He stepped aside on 22 April 2005 and was replaced by Ashraf Rifi. He was one of seven pro-Syrian officials whose resignations had been requested by the Lebanese opposition after the assassination of Hariri.

== Controversy ==
The first UN team investigating the Hariri assassination led by Irish deputy Garda Commissioner Peter Fitzgerald discovered that the wreckage of Hariri's six-car motorcade had been removed from the crime scene at midnight on 14 February 2005. It was further found that other materials were not associated with the bomb placed in the massive crater. The man responsible for doing so was allegedly General Ali Al Hajj. It was also found that General Hajj after being appointed to the post as the head of the internal security forces reduced the number of state bodyguards of Hariri from 40 down to eight in November 2004. The reason for this reduction was given to be a letter from then Lebanese president Emile Lahoud and then Lebanese prime minister, indicating that Lebanese law should be applied on all levels and in all matters. According to a decree (3509 of 1993), the number of security staff for a person in the Hariri category should be eight.

On 30 August 2005, the Lebanese authorities arrested and detained four high-level officials including General Jamil Al Sayyed, former head of the Lebanese general security (Sûreté Générale), General Ali Al Hajj, former head of the internal security forces, General Raymond Azar, former head of military intelligence and General Mustapha Hamdan, commander of the republican guard brigade. They were arrested at the request of German prosecutor Detlev Mehlis, who was carrying out the UN investigation about the assassination. The Mehlis report dated October 2005 quoted a witness stating that Jamil Al Sayyed cooperated closely with Mustapha Hamdan and Raymond Azar in the preparation of the Hariri assassination and that Hajj knew about the attack in advance. However, later reports about the assassination did not repeat the allegations against these Lebanese generals. Hajj and other generals were held in Roumieh prison, northeast of Beirut from 2005 to April 2009. They were released from the prison upon the order of the Special Tribunal for Lebanon pre-trial judge Daniel Fransen due to lack of evidence. They were not charged with any crime.

== Personal life ==
Ali Al Hajj married Samar Al Hajj, who is a social activist. His son is a major in the Lebanese Internal Security Forces.
