= Roumieh =

Roumieh رومية
- City
- Location within Lebanon
- Coordinates: 33°52′52″N 35°36′55″E
- Country: Lebanon
- Governorate: Mount Lebanon Governorate
- District: Matn District
- Highest elevation: 700 m (2,300 ft)
- Lowest elevation: 100 m (330 ft)
- Time zone: UTC+2 (EET)
  - Summer (DST): UTC+3 (EEST)
- Dialing code: +961

Roumieh (Levantine Arabic: رومية, romanized: Rūmiyeh) is a town north-east of Beirut in Lebanon. Surrounded by pine-forested hills, Roumieh is a 10- or 15-minute drive from the coast. Roumieh is known as a pleasant, picturesque small mountain town with many gardens.

== Agriculture ==
In addition to pine forests there are vineyards, fig orchards, olive groves and thyme grow in abundance. The village is well known for the Arak liquor it produces.

== Climate ==
Roumieh is characterized by a temperate climate, including dry summers, rainy winters, and transitional fall and spring seasons. It is located 550 to 700 meters above sea level.

== Demographics ==
The village's community is mainly constituted of Maronite Catholics and Greek Catholics, as well as Greek Orthodox and Armenian Orthodox. It is populated by approximately 5,000 permanents residents, excluding the prison's population.

== Topography ==
The word "Roumieh" comes from Aramaic, meaning "hills" and refers to this characterising feature of the local terrain. This is understandable when one sees the "bumpy" pinetree-covered hills in the pastures of the village.

Like all Lebanese mountain villages, Roumieh is marked with very beautiful terraces (Jleleh), designed to optimise the use of its land for agriculture and horticulture. Indeed, as cited above, some of the crops grown in Roumieh are exceptionally good given that the community ceased being agrarian nearly half a century ago.

There used to be several natural streams (Ain) that surfaced in the village which were a good source of water for the residents. However, due to disorganised and sporadic construction in some of the marginal parts of town, most of these have disappeared. There is only one that remains properly functional, at the fountain in the centre of the village. The square surrounding the fountain has always been very pretty but has now been somewhat diminished by political graffiti and political propaganda posters.

One can find some very pretty traditional Lebanese houses (pyramidal red brick roofs, white or sandstone walls with overlooking balconies and verandas shaped with arches in the old Levantine style) in Roumieh. Examples of this are some surrounding the Saydeh Church, and others in the Naas and Haret el Tahta and Fawka neighbourhoods.

== History and People ==
Whilst the village itself is quite old (founded circa 1500), the 20th Century saw the village coming to a more prominent role in the area. With the ongoing diaspora towards the West including both North and Latin America, the village acquired wealth. Relatively to other similar villages, its inhabitants became increasingly educated (partially thanks to the proximity of Beirut and its institutions). Lebanon has been plagued by sectarian violence since the 19th century, when Maronite and Druze communities were fighting in the mountains. More recently, the Civil War that erupted in 1975 was the scene of severe sectarian tensions.

Although Roumieh is known for its people quarrelling over politics and even fighting from time to time, it is a tight-knit community that has survived the most divisive horrors of the Lebanese Civil War and the ongoing political turmoil. The village's diversity of opinions underlines its development that outdoes by far other villages in the area. The villagers may disagree with each other on matters of politics, and given how seriously they take this, they may even go as far as being hostile to each other. However, Roumieh remains a community that its forefathers built and will remain so thanks to some outstanding members who have been known to put family and village before anything else. Lebanese villages have always been collectivistic societies. Lebanon's villagers have always put the family in the first place, followed by the individual. The family, the church and the community at large dictate group patterns in Lebanese villages.

Roumieh's population has changed due to the relocation of many people to the center of Lebanon, Maten and its areas. But Roumieh maintained its look and vision, unlike surrounding towns, due to its closed-knit community and people of the town.

== Public institutions ==
- "Dahr el-Bachek" hospital (originally established to treat patients with Tuberculosis) was founded in 1909, primarily intended as a place where inhabitants of Beirut could come to enjoy fresh air and rest. In 1931, the first pieces of hospital equipment were added.
- Faculty of engineering of the Lebanese University (Second Branch)
- Roumieh prison, Lebanon's largest prison located at a lower elevation at the western entrance of the town. Severely overcrowded, (holding up to 5,500 prisoners) it violates basic UN standards for safety and hygiene. It is often the site of inmate uprisings, the most recent one on 15 February 2013 when a group of Islamist prisoners rioted over the decision to transfer one of their members to another cell.
- Der el Rahmeh (retirement home for senior citizens)
- Barracks of the Lebanese Army's Special Forces

== Education ==
- Brummana High School Brummana High School (BHS), a British Quaker School founded in 1873
- Lycée Charlemagne, a French international school,
- Antonine Sisters High School, a trilingual school, is located in Roumieh.
- Lebanese University faculty of Engineering
