= Lycée Charlemagne (Lebanon) =

French international school in Lebanon

Lycée Charlemagne is a French international school in Roumieh, Lebanon. It serves petite section through terminale, the final year of lycée (senior high school/sixth form college).

The school first opened with maternelle (kindergarten) students in 1997. The French Ministry of National Education approved the school during the 2004–2005 school year, and the ministry approved the whole school at the primary level in 2006. In 2008-2009 secondary school classes opened. It originated from the Home Des 7 Nains, a school established in 1988 by Mr. and Mrs. El Chaer.
