= Qubbah prison =

Prison in Tripoli, Lebanon

Qubbah prison (Arabic: سجن القبة) is the largest correctional facility in northern Lebanon, located in Tripoli, Tripoli District. It regularly holds nearly 600 prisoners and has been deemed to be very overcrowded.

On Sunday January 25, 2009, at around 5:30pm a mutiny erupted in the prison and prisoners took control of the second floor where an estimated 20 prisoners set fire to their bed mats and held two security officers working at the prison's pharmacy prisoner as hostages. Prisoners demanded amnesty and reduced sentences.

The riot was ended by a special commando unit on Monday January 26, 2009. The intervention was reportedly swift and did not include the use of deadly force.

On 7 April 2020, a riot broke out at Qubbah prison, with reports of a "number of injuries". In a separate incident, Lebanese security forces thwarted a mass escape attempt at a prison in Beqaa Governorate, which relatives of inmates said was linked to fears of COVID-19.

== See also ==
- Yarze prison
- Roumieh prison
