= Mustafa Hamdan =

Lebanese general

Mustafa Hamdan (or Mustapha Hamdan), (Arabic: مصطفى حمدان; born 1955) is a retired Lebanese army general and head of the presidential guard, and head of Al-Mourabitoun movement. He is also the nephew of the group's founder, Ibrahim Kulaylat.

== Career ==
Mustafa Hamdan was tasked with protecting army commander Émile Lahoud in 1990. He was appointed head of the Republican Guard in 1998. He is known to be a close aide-de-camp to Lebanese President Émile Lahoud and Michel Aoun.

== Controversy ==
On 30 August 2005, Hamdan was arrested along with three other Lebanese generals during the investigation of the assassination of former Lebanese Prime Minister Rafik Hariri, who was killed on 14 February 2005 in a massive explosion targeting his motorcade near downtown Beirut. The other generals arrested were Jamil al Sayyed, Ali Al Hajj and Raymond Azar. The 19 October 2005 Mehlis report stated Hamdan told a witness: "We are going to send him on a trip -- bye, bye Hariri." It also quoted a witness saying that Hamdan had provided logistical support. Hamdan and other generals were held in Roumieh prison, northeast of Beirut from 2005 to 29 April 2009 . They were released from the prison upon the order of Special Tribunal Lebanon Pre-Trial Judge Daniel Fransen due to lack of evidence. They were not charged with a crime.

== See also ==
- Lebanese Arab Army
- Lebanese Civil War
