= Yarze Prison =

Lebanese prison southeast of Beirut

Coordinates: 33.8869°N 35.5131°E

Yarze Prison is a Lebanese prison located southeast of Beirut. It is under the direct control of the Ministry of Defense.

One of the most well-known prisoners has been Samir Geagea, the Christian leader of the Lebanese Forces political party and former militia. Geagea spent 11 years and 3 months in a small prison cell, which he describes as "a dungeon". He was released on 26 July 2005 to a hero's welcome as part of the Cedar Revolution revolt against the Syrian-controlled government.

== See also ==
- Roumieh Prison
- Qubbah prison
