= Toyota Land Cruiser (J40) =

Series of four-wheel-drive vehicles

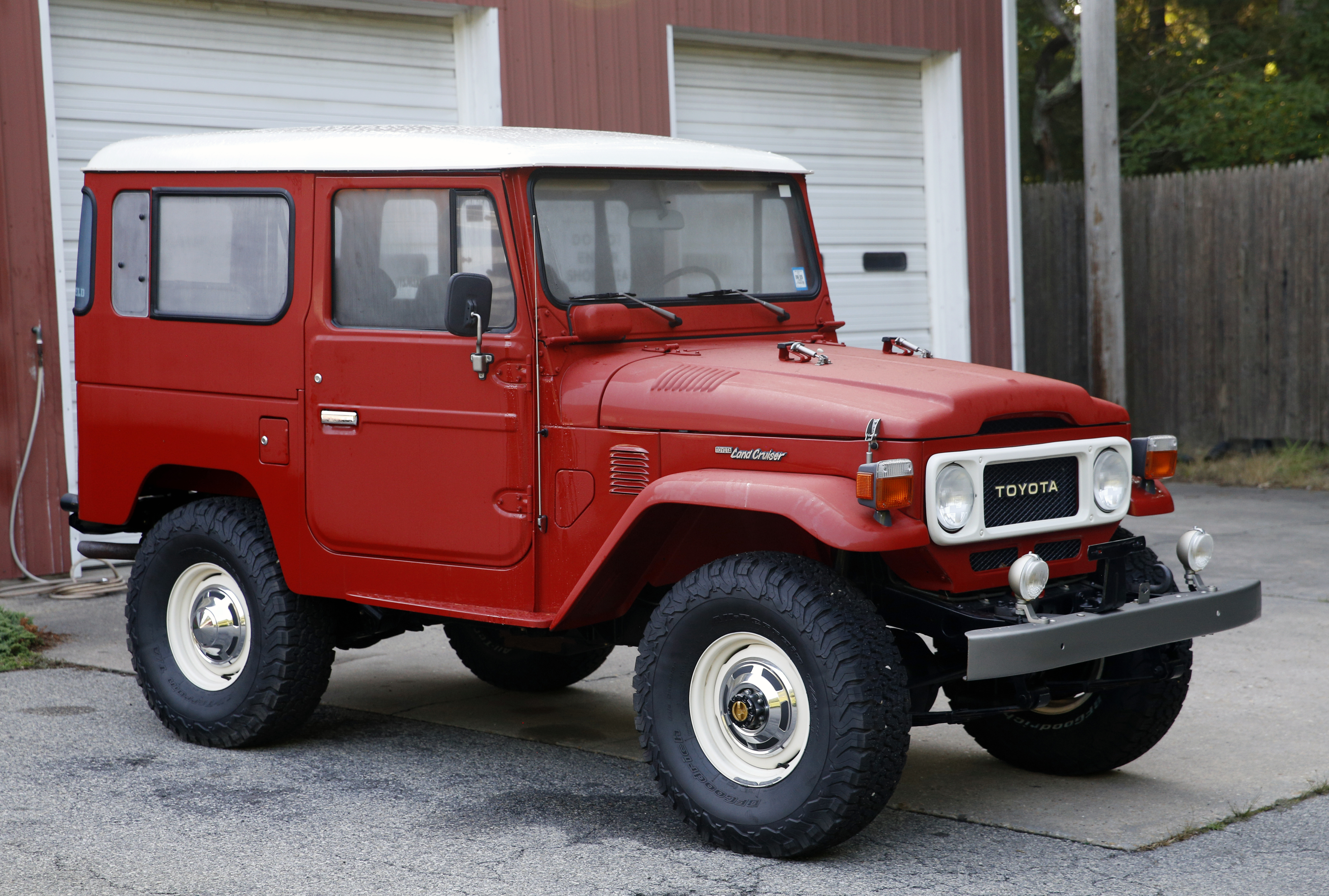

Overview
- Manufacturer: Toyota
- Also called: Toyota Bandeirante (Brazil)
- Production: 1960–1984; 1968–2001 (Brazil)
- Assembly: Japan: Toyota City; Brazil: São Bernardo; Venezuela: Cumaná; Indonesia: Jakarta; Malaysia: Sarawak

Body and chassis
- Class: Off-road vehicle
- Body style: 2-door pickup; 2-door off-road vehicle; 4-door pickup; 4-door off-road vehicle (1960–1966)
- Layout: Front-engine, rear-wheel-drive / four-wheel-drive

Powertrain
- Engine: Petrol: 3.9-litre F I6; 4.2-litre 2F I6; Diesel: 3.0-litre B I4; 3.2-litre 2B I4; 3.4-litre 3B I4; 3.6-litre H I6; 3.7-litre 14B I4 (Bandeirante); 3.8-litre Mercedes OM314 I4 (Bandeirante); 4.0-litre 2H I6; 4.0-litre Mercedes OM364 I4 (Bandeirante)
- Transmission: 3-speed manual; 4-speed manual (from 1974); 5-speed manual (from 1984)

Dimensions
- Wheelbase: 2,285 mm (90.0 in); 2,430 mm (95.7 in); 2,650 mm (104.3 in); 2,950 mm (116.1 in)

Chronology
- Predecessor: Toyota Land Cruiser (J20)
- Successor: Toyota Land Cruiser (J50); Toyota Land Cruiser (J70)

The Toyota Land Cruiser (J40) is a series of Land Cruisers made by Toyota from 1960 until 2001. The 40 series Land Cruisers featured a traditional body on frame construction, and most were built as 2-door models with slightly larger dimensions than the similar Jeep CJ.

The model was available in short (J40/41/42), medium (J43/44/46) and long (J45/47) wheelbase versions, with petrol and diesel engines. Unlike previous models, the J40 was fitted with a two-speed transfer case, allowing for easier low-speed maneuvering on steep terrain.

== History ==
Timeline and Model Designations:

- 1960: J40 series launched (wheelbase 2,285 mm (90.0 in)/2,430 mm (95.7 in)/2,650 mm (104.3 in)).
- 1962: Bandeirante production in Brazil started with the FJ25 model in November 1962. In December 1962 the engine was changed to the locally produced Mercedes-Benz diesel engine.
- 1963: Longer wheelbase (2,950 mm (116.1 in)), FJ45-B, pickup and cab-chassis were added).
- 1967: End of four-door FJ45V (I) (2,650 mm (104.3 in) WB) production, replaced by FJ55 Station wagon).

2-door FJ45-B renamed FJ45 (II) (2,950 mm (116.1 in) WB).

- 1968: Bandeirante production changed to the FJ40 body, still using Mercedes-Benz diesel engines.

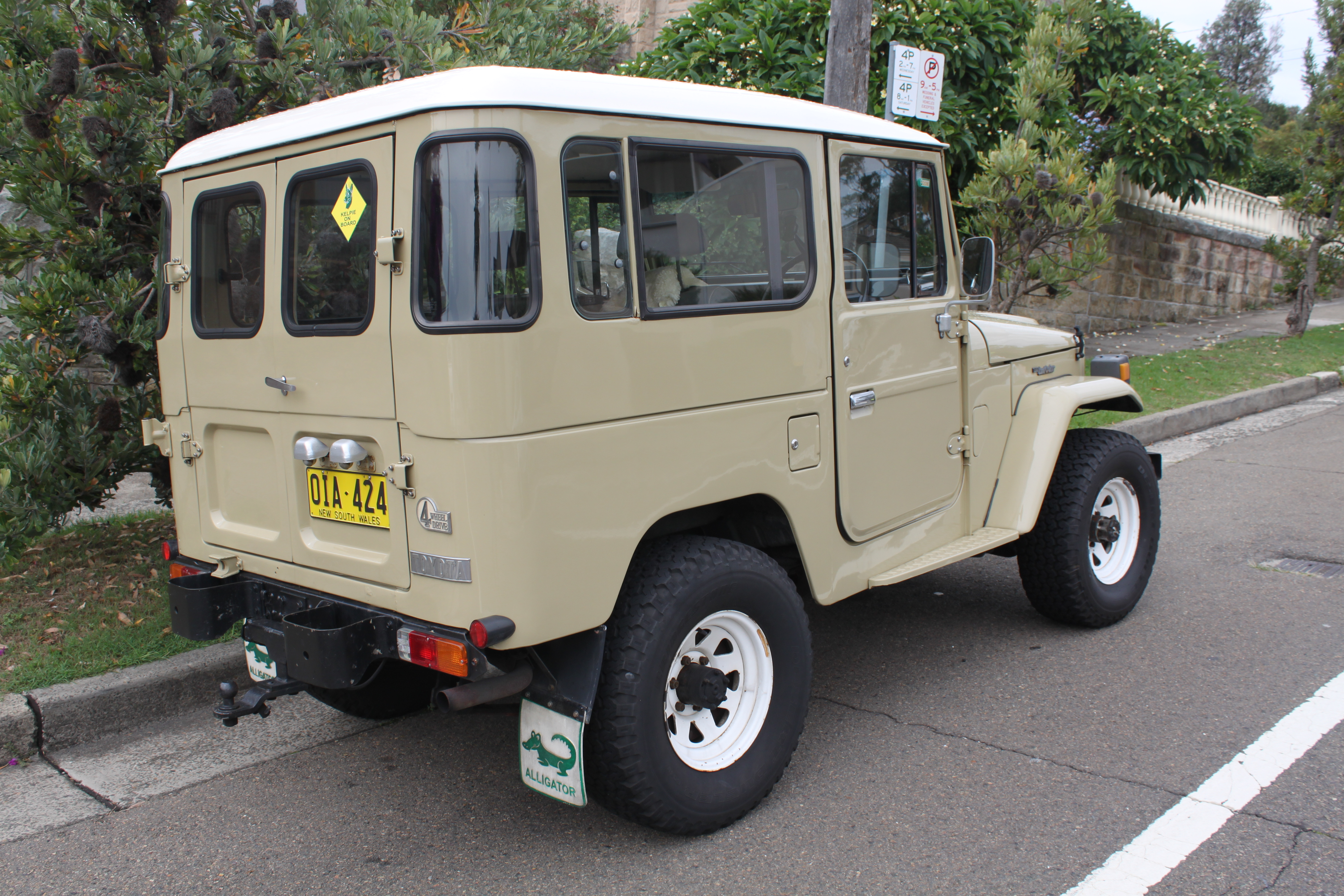
Toyota Land Cruiser hardtop

- 1972: HJ45 launched with the H, 3.6-litre inline 6-cylinder diesel engine.
- 1974: BJ40/43 launched with the B, 3.0-litre inline 4-cylinder diesel engine. A factory-fitted roll bar becomes standard in the United States (FJ40).
- 1975: Rear barn doors are added to US model FJ40s. The lift gate remains available as an option in other countries.
- 1976: Disc brakes on the front axle.
- 1977: Front door vent windows removed, added rear vent windows on the hard top in the United States
- 1979: Power steering (only F models) and air conditioning added to the options, gear ratios modified from 4.11 to 3.70 in the United States to be more freeway friendly. 1979 and later FJ40s square grille bezels.
- 1980: HJ47 launched with a 4.0-liter six-cylinder diesel engine. End of HJ45 production.

BJ42/46 and BJ45 launched with a 3.4-liter four-cylinder diesel engine.

- 1981: Power steering added on the BJ models to the options, disc brakes added in Australia.
- 1984: End of J40 series production in most markets (replaced by J70 series). Continued as the Bandeirante in Brazil.
- 1993: Five-speed transmission becomes available for the Toyota Bandeirante.
- 1994: In Brazil, the locally built Mercedes-Benz OM-364 engine is replaced by the imported Toyota 14B unit.
- 2001: End of Bandeirante production.

=== In Brazil ===
In Brazil, the J40 was known as the Toyota Bandeirante, and made from 1968 until 2001. The previous generation, built in Brazil from 1958 to 1962, received the series code FJ25 (open roof) and FJ25L (soft top) but are often referred to as FJ-251, and in 1961 thanks to a new motor called 2F - not to be confounded with the later 2F engine from 1975 - some late units were built with the series code FJ-151L (soft top). Bandeirantes built from 1968 to 1993 were fitted with locally manufactured Mercedes-Benz engines and received OJ40/45–series chassis codes (OJ50/55 from 1973). Imported Toyota engines were once again used on those built from 1994 to 2001, which have BJ50/55 series model codes.

== Models ==
- The J40/41/42 was a two-door short wheelbase four-wheel-drive vehicle, with either a soft or a hardtop (V). It was available with various petrol or diesel (from 1974) engines over its lifetime. It was replaced on most markets from 1984 by the J70 series (70/71).
  - The FJ42 is 4X2 model only sold in the Middle East.
- The J43/44/46 was an extremely rare two-door medium wheelbase four-wheel-drive vehicle, with either a soft or a hard-top (V). It was replaced on most markets from 1984 by the J70 series (73/74).
- The J45/47 was a long-wheelbase four-wheel-drive vehicle, available in two-door hardtop, three-door hardtop, four-door station wagon and two-door pickup models. The four-door station wagon model (FJ45-V/LV) was the shortest-lived of the J40 series, as it was replaced by the FJ55G/V in 1967.
- The Bandeirante TB25/TB41/TB51 Series are J25 series Land Cruisers built in Brazil by Toyota do Brasil Ltda from 1962 to 1968. In 1966 they were replaced by the OJ32 (soft top) and OJ31 (hard top) for the TB25, and the TB81 for the TB51.
- The second generation Bandeirante OJ40/OJ45 Series (1968 to 1973), OJ50/OJ55 Series (1973 to 1994) and BJ50/BJ55 Series (1994 to 2001) are J40 series cars built in Brazil by Toyota do Brasil Ltda from 1968 to 2001. Identical to the BJ40 in almost every respect, it had a few stylistic modifications to the grille (models produced from 1989 on featured square headlights, instead of the round ones used before) and used Mercedes-Benz OM-314/OM-324/OM-364 diesel engines (replaced by Toyota 14B inline 4 direct injection Diesel engine in 1994) for much of its production life; another visible major characteristic are the entire hind doors (like in Land Rover SUVs) rather than the traditional Toyota two-wing hind doors at the Bandeirante's hard top models.

Land Cruiser paint color codes
Code	Color
012	Cygnus White
031	White (?-'80)
033	White ('80-)
113	Health Grey
309	Freeborn Red
310	Capri Blue
414	Buffalo Brown
415	Pueblo Brown
416	Dune Beige
464	Beige; Traditional Beige
474	Dark Copper
532	Mustard Yellow
611	Dark Green
621	Rustic Green
622	Nebula Green
653	Sicilian Olive
681	Green (Nicknamed "John Deere Green")
808	Horizontal Blue
822	Royal Blue
854	Sky Blue
857	Nordic Blue; Feel Like Blue

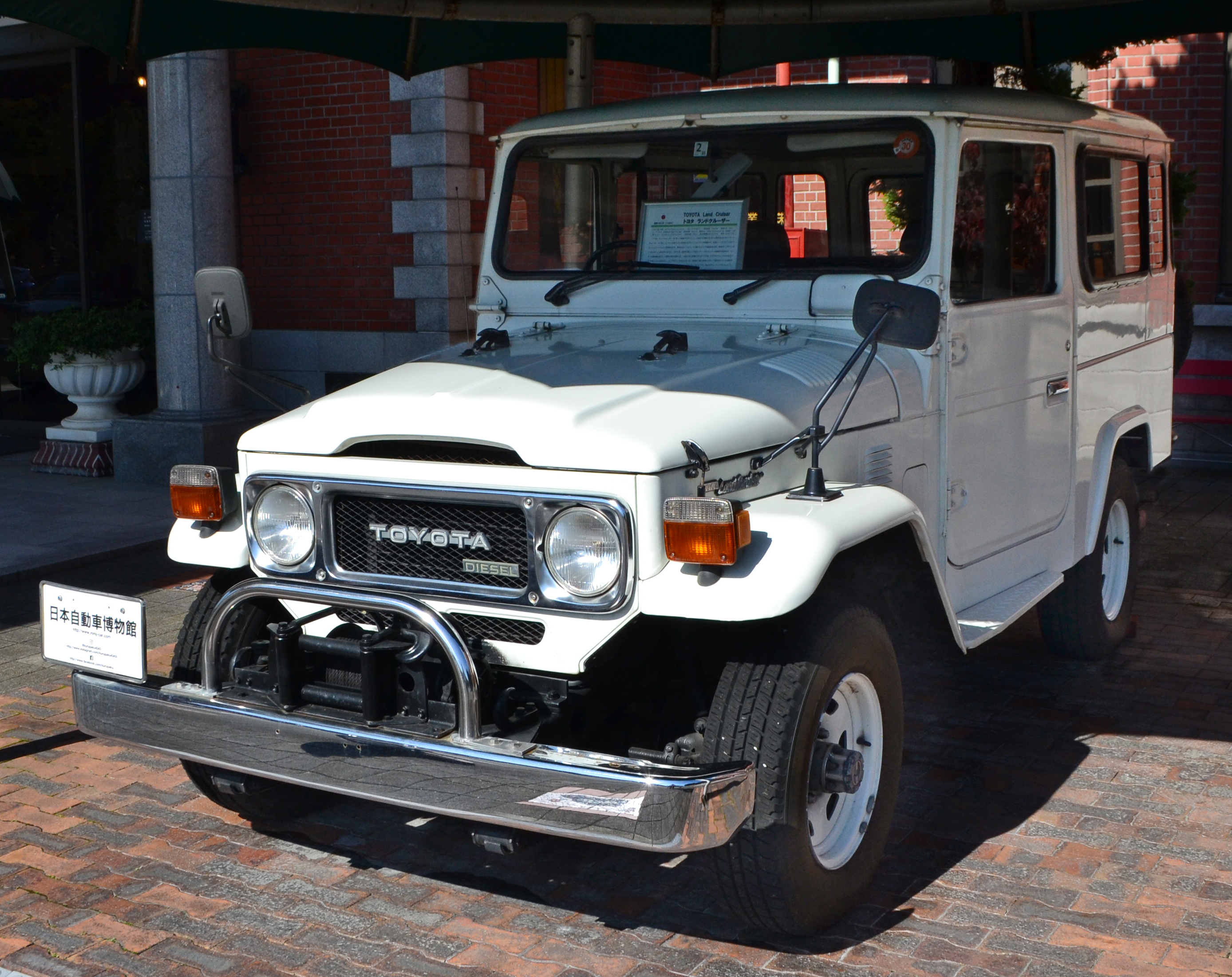
A medium wheelbase BJ46-V Hardtop (1984; JDM)

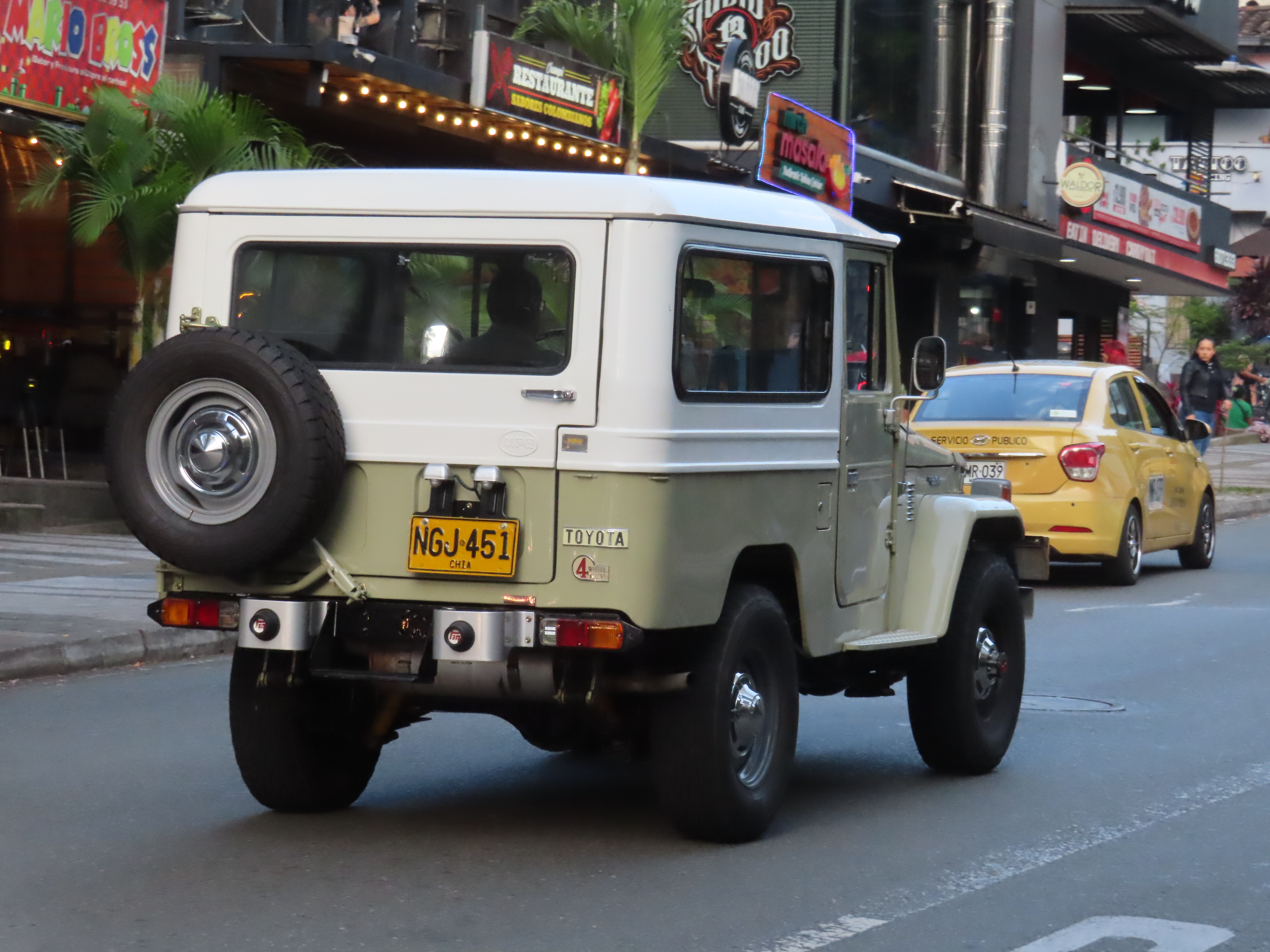
A medium wheelbase J43 with a fibreglass hardtop (Colombia)

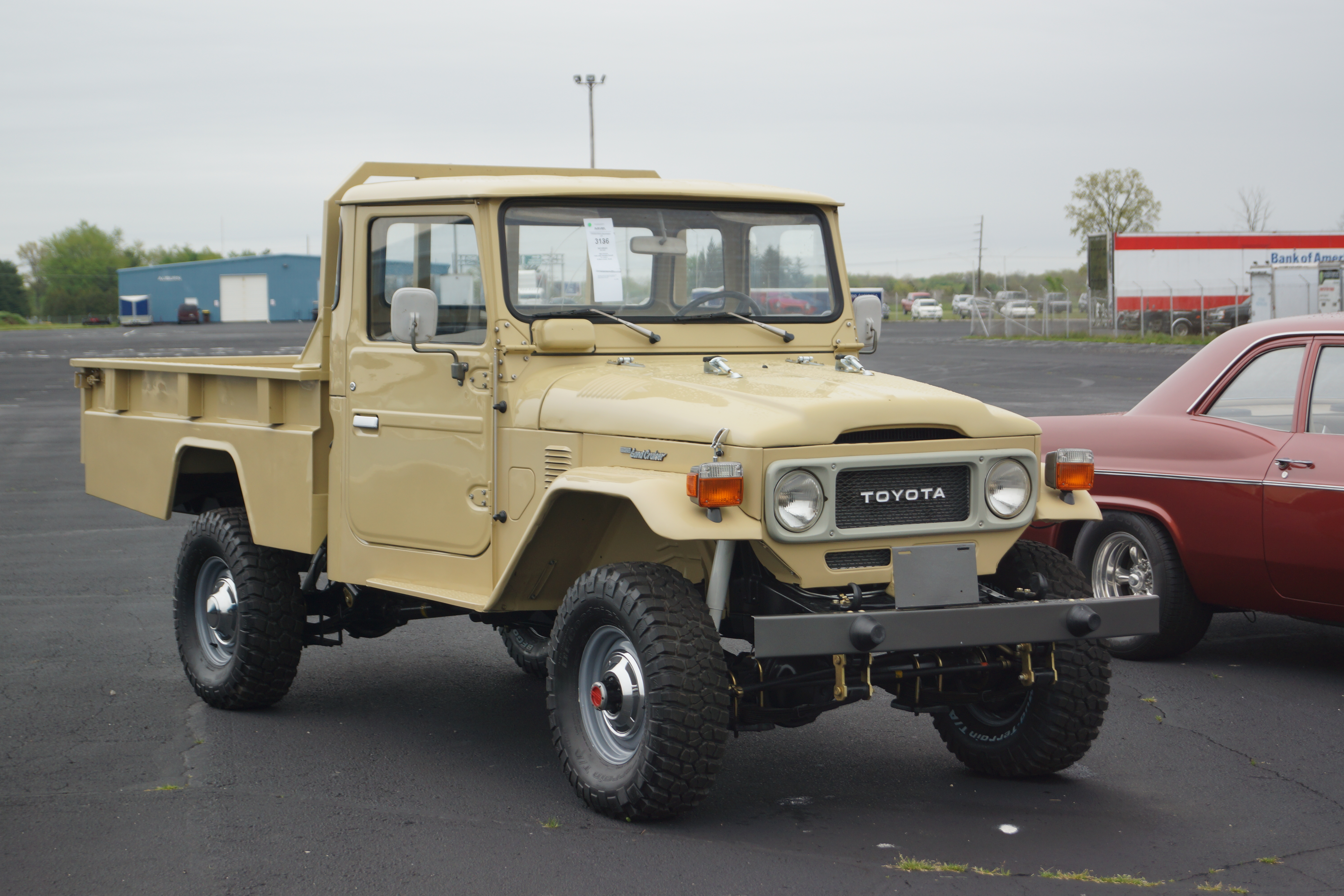
1985 Land Cruiser FJ45 pickup

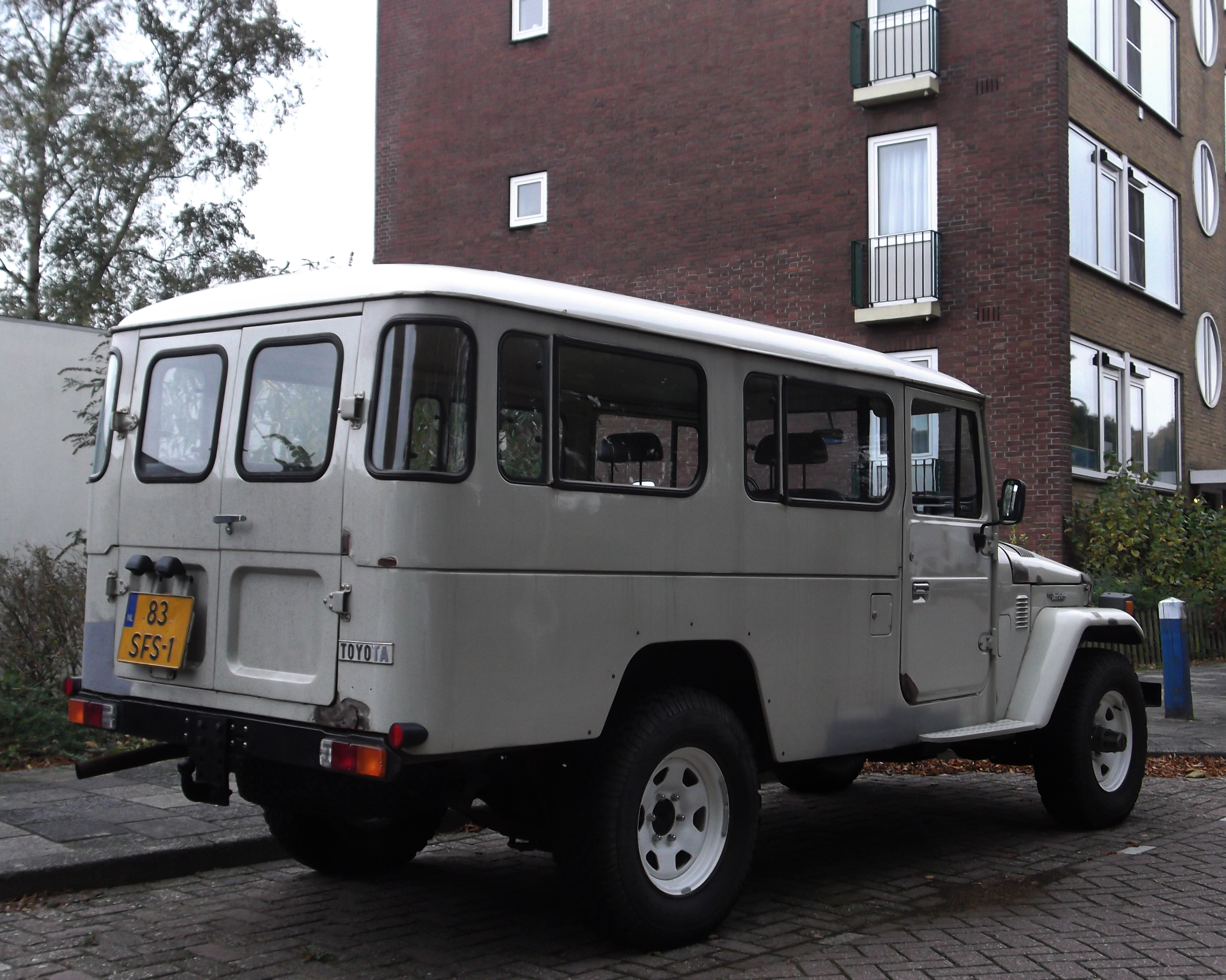
Land Cruiser Station Wagon (FJ45)

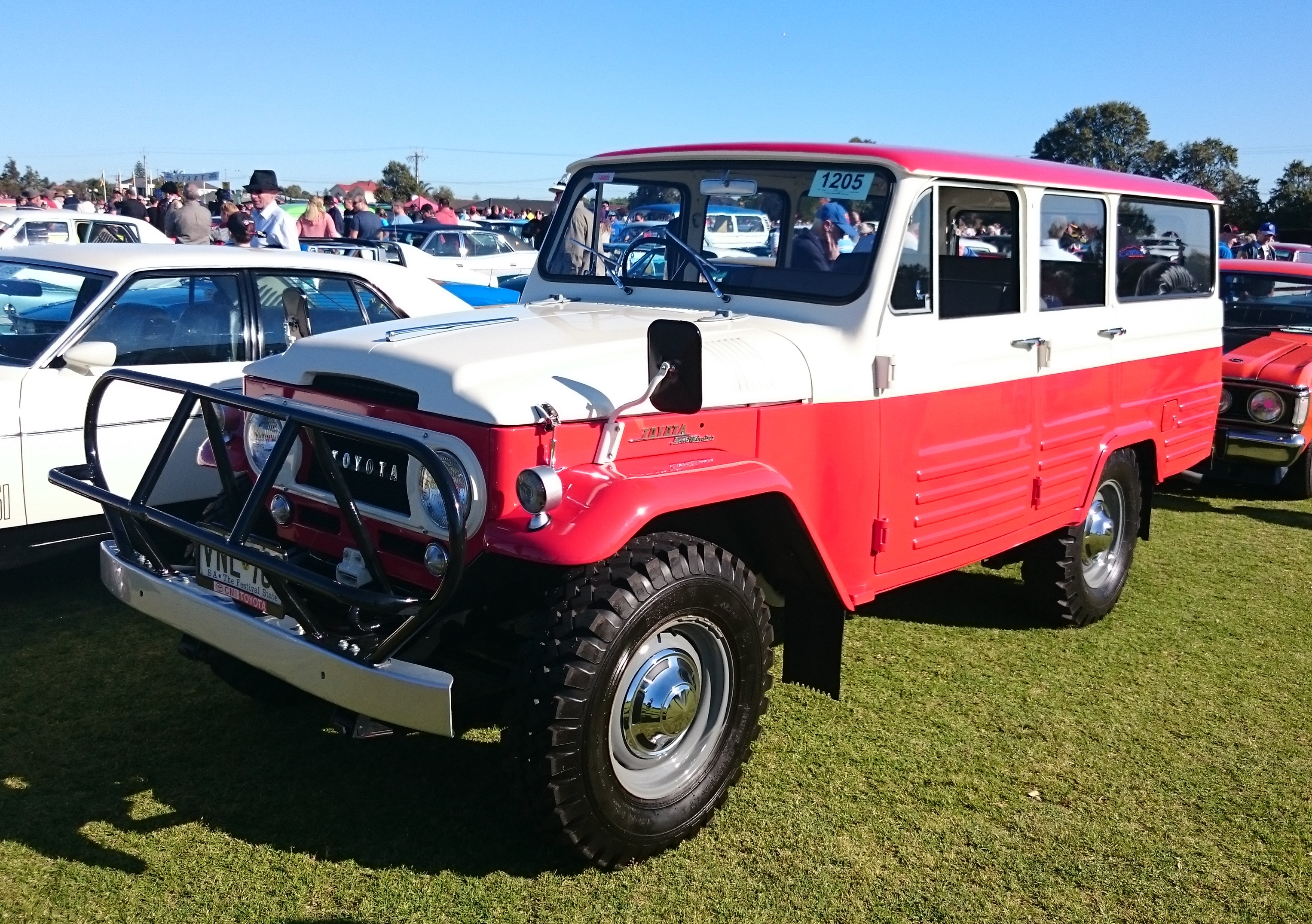
1963 Land Cruiser 4-door Station Wagon (FJ45-V)

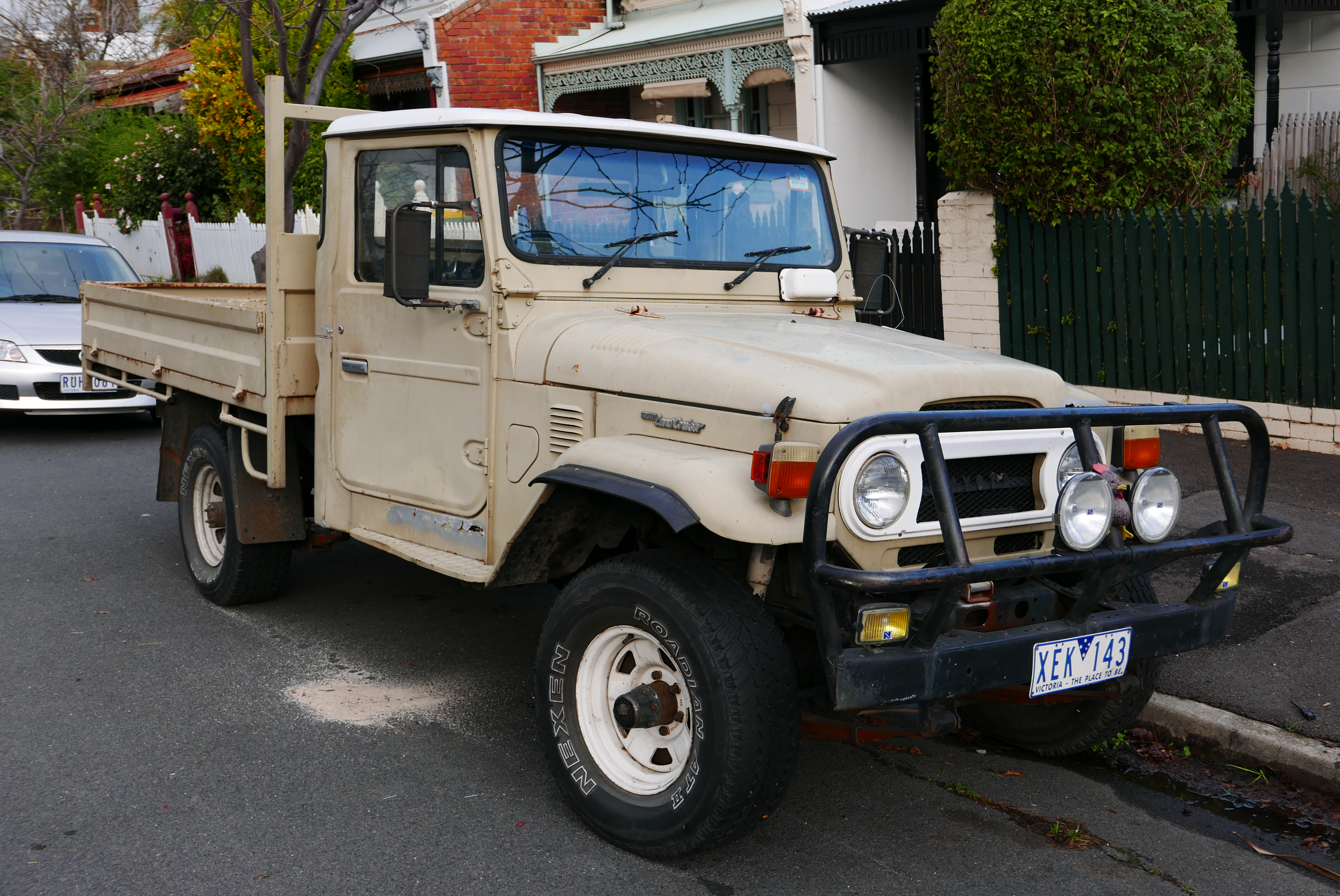
1981 Land Cruiser HJ47 utility

=== The Bandeirante Models ===
- 1968:
  - OJ40L - Short soft top bushdrive car - motor Mercedes-Benz OM-324 (September 1968 to January/February 1973) - replaces the OJ32L
  - OJ40LV - Short hard top bushdrive car - motor Mercedes-Benz OM-324 (October 1968 to January/February 1973) - replaces the OJ31L
  - OJ40LV-B - Long hard top bushdrive car - motor Mercedes-Benz OM-324 (October 1968 to January/February 1973) - replaces the TB41L
  - OJ45LP-B - Short pickup with native bed - motor Mercedes-Benz OM-324 (September 1968 to January/February 1973) - replaces the TB81L
- 1973:
  - OJ50L - Short soft top bushdrive car - motor Mercedes-Benz OM-314 (February 1973 to November 1989) - replaces the OJ40L
  - OJ50LV - Short hard top bushdrive car - motor Mercedes-Benz OM-314 (February 1973 to November 1989) - replaces the OJ40LV
  - OJ50LV-B - Long hard top bushdrive car - motor Mercedes-Benz OM-314 (February 1973 to November 1989) - replaces the OJ40LV-B
  - OJ55LP-B - Short pickup with native bed - motor Mercedes-Benz OM-314 (February 1973 to November 1989) - replaces the OJ45LP-B
- between 1973 and 1989:
  - OJ55LP-B3 - Short chassis-cab pickup - motor Mercedes-Benz OM-314 (19?? to November 1989) - new in 19??
  - OJ55LP-BL - Long pickup with native bed - motor Mercedes-Benz OM-314 (19?? to November 1989) - new in 19??
  - OJ55LP-BL3 - Short chassis-cab pickup - motor Mercedes-Benz OM-314 (19?? to November 1989) - new in 19??
  - OJ55LP-2BL - Long 2-door double cabin pickup with native bed - motor Mercedes-Benz OM-314 (19?? to November 1989) - new in 19??
- 1989:
  - OJ50L - Short soft top bushdrive car - motor Mercedes-Benz OM-364 (November 1989 to April 1994) - replaces the OJ50L with Mercedes-Benz OM-314 motor
  - OJ50LV - Short hard top bushdrive car - motor Mercedes-Benz OM-364 (November 1989 to April 1994) - replaces the OJ50LV with Mercedes-Benz OM-314 motor
  - OJ50LV-B - Long hard top bushdrive car - motor Mercedes-Benz OM-364 (November 1989 to April 1994) - replaces the OJ50LV-B with Mercedes-Benz OM-314 motor
  - OJ55LP-B - Short pickup with native bed - motor Mercedes-Benz OM-364 (November 1989 to April 1994) - replaces the OJ55LP-B with Mercedes-Benz OM-314 motor
  - OJ55LP-B3 - Short chassis-cab pickup - motor Mercedes-Benz OM-364 (November 1989 to April 1994) - replaces the OJ55LP-B3 with Mercedes-Benz OM-314 motor
  - OJ55LP-BL - Long pickup with native bed - motor Mercedes-Benz OM-364 (November 1989 to April 1994) - replaces the OJ55LP-BL with Mercedes-Benz OM-314 motor
  - OJ55LP-BL3 - Long chassis-cab pickup - motor Mercedes-Benz OM-364 (November 1989 to April 1994) - replaces the OJ55LP-BL3 with Mercedes-Benz OM-314 motor
  - OJ55LP-2BL - Long 2-door double cabin pickup with native bed - motor Mercedes-Benz OM-364 (November 1989 to April 1994) - replaces the OJ55LP-2BL with Mercedes-Benz OM-314 motor
- 1994:
  - BJ50L - Short soft top bushdrive car - motor Toyota 14B - April 1994 to November 2001 - replaces the OJ50L
  - BJ50LV - Short hard top bushdrive car - motor Toyota 14B - April 1994 to November 2001 - replaces the OJ50LV
  - BJ50LV-B - Long hard top bushdrive car - motor Toyota 14B - April 1994 to November 2001 - replaces the OJ50LV-B
  - BJ55LP-B - Short pickup with native bed - motor Toyota 14B - April 1994 to November 2001 - replaces the OJ55LP-B
  - BJ55LP-B3 - Short chassis-cab pickup - motor Toyota 14B - April 1994 to November 2001 - replaces the OJ55LP-B3
  - BJ55LP-BL - Long pickup with native bed - motor Toyota 14B - April 1994 to November 2001 - replaces the OJ55LP-BL
  - BJ55LP-BL3 - Long chassis-cab pickup - motor Toyota 14B - April 1994 to November 2001 - replaces the OJ55LP-BL3
  - BJ55LP-2BL - Long 2-door double cabin pickup with native bed - motor Toyota 14B - April 1994 to November 2001 - replaces the OJ55LP-2BL
- 1999:
  - BJ55LP-2BL4 - Long 2-door double cabin pickup with native bed - motor Toyota 14B - 1999 to November 2001 - new in 1999
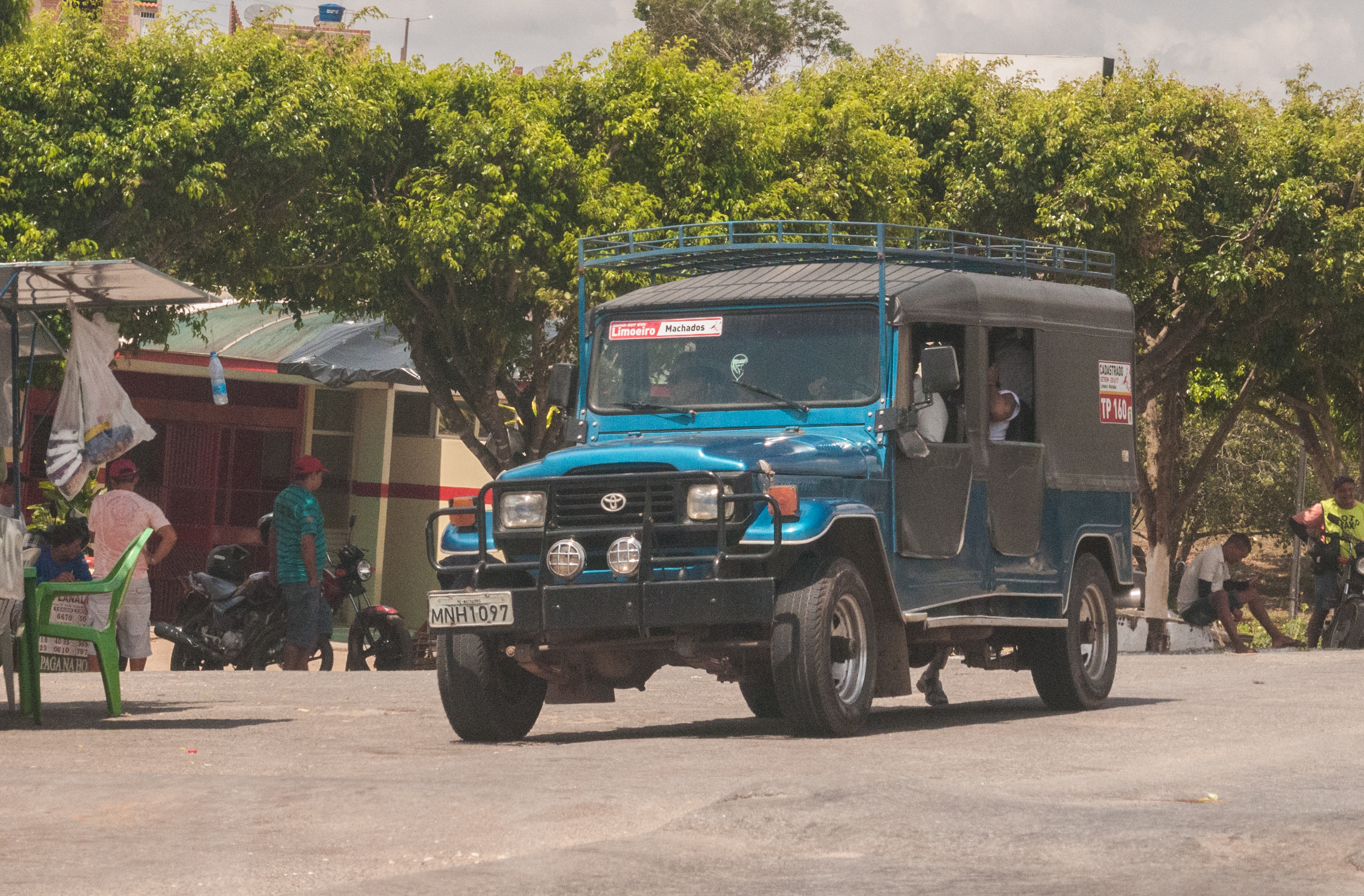
Toyota Bandeirante

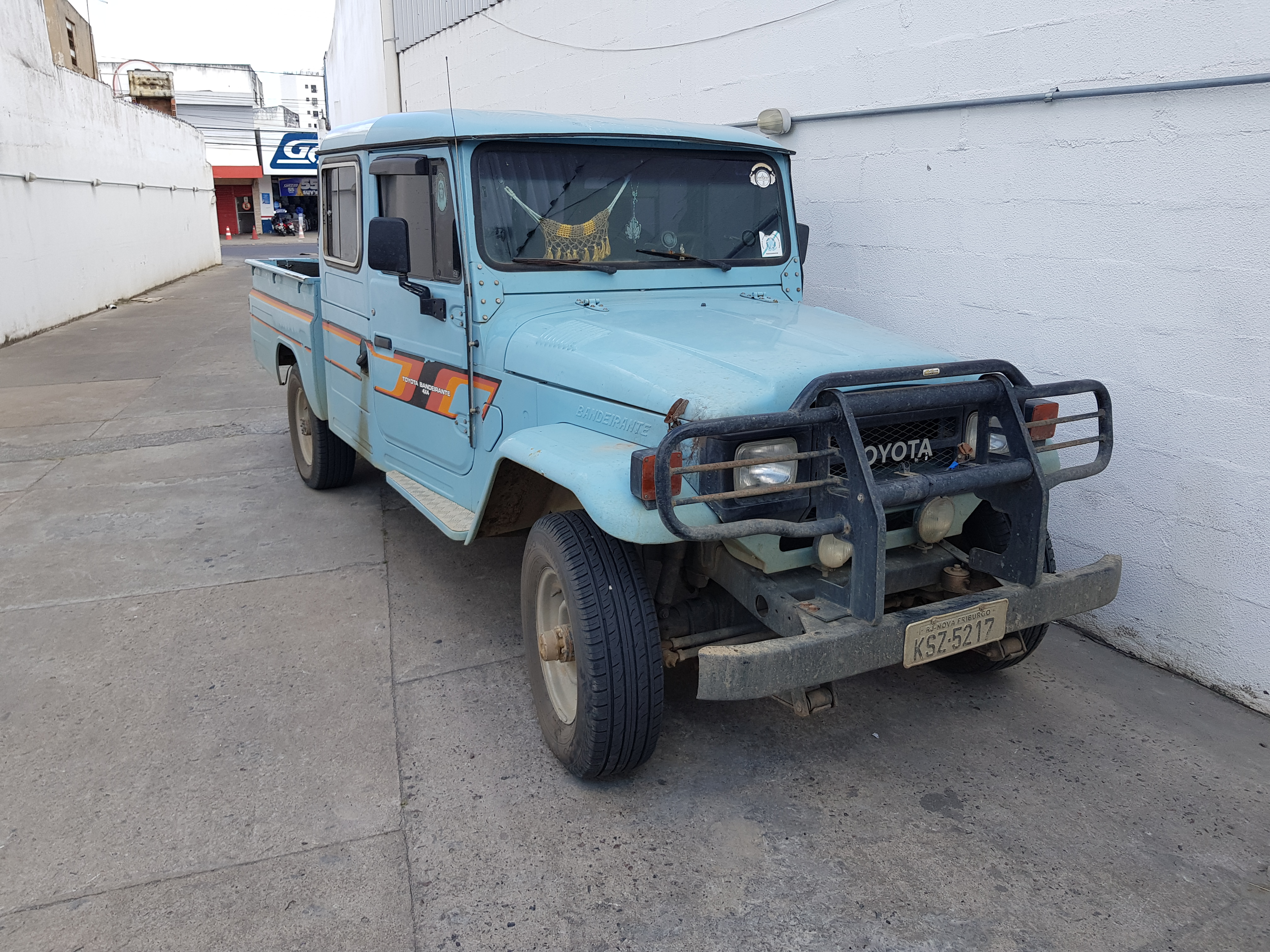
Toyota Bandeirante Pick up

== Engines ==
The J40 series was produced with both diesel and petrol engines. The F series was a 6-cylinder petrol motor, B series a 4-cylinder diesel, and H series a 6-cylinder diesel. The diesel trucks were never sold to the general public in the United States, though some found their way in as mine trucks. Some engines are similar within their series; for example, the F and 2F engines share many of the same parts. However the H and 2H designations have almost nothing in common.

Engines included (power and torque figures may vary depending on the market):

Petrol
Engine	Capacity (L)	Power (hp)	Torque	Used	Notes
F	3.9	78 kW (106 PS; 105 hp); 93 kW (127 PS; 125 hp); 96 kW (130 PS; 128 hp)	256 N⋅m (189 lb⋅ft); 283 N⋅m (209 lb⋅ft); 294 N⋅m (217 lb⋅ft)	1960–1975	Japan
2F	4.2	99 kW (135 PS; 133 hp)	284 N⋅m (210 lb⋅ft)	1975–1984	Not in Japan

Diesel
Engine	Capacity (L)	Power (hp)	Torque	Used	Notes
B	3.0	60 kW (81 PS; 80 hp); 63 kW (85 PS; 84 hp)	191 N⋅m (141 lb⋅ft); 196 N⋅m (145 lb⋅ft)	1974–1984	Japan
2B	3.2	68 kW (93 PS; 92 hp)	215 N⋅m (159 lb⋅ft)	1979–1981	
3B	3.4	67 kW (91 PS; 90 hp)	217 N⋅m (160 lb⋅ft)	1979–1984	
H	3.6	70 kW (95 PS; 94 hp)	216 N⋅m (159 lb⋅ft)	1972–1980	
2H	4.0	78 kW (106 PS; 105 hp)	240 N⋅m (177 lb⋅ft)	1980–1984	
OM324	3.4	57 kW (78 PS; 77 hp)	262 N⋅m (193 lb⋅ft)	1961–1973	Bandeirante
OM314	3.8	63 kW (85 PS; 84 hp)	235 N⋅m (174 lb⋅ft)	1973–1989	Bandeirante
OM364	4.0	66 kW (90 PS; 89 hp)	319 N⋅m (235 lb⋅ft)	1989–1994	Bandeirante
14B	3.7	71 kW (96 PS; 95 hp)	239 N⋅m (176 lb⋅ft)	1994–2001	Bandeirante

== Features ==
- A pair of jump seats folded behind the front seats, maximizing cargo space compared to the full width folding rear seat of the Jeep CJ series.
- Original factory optional winches were P.T.O. driven. Later models were electric powered.

== Legacy ==
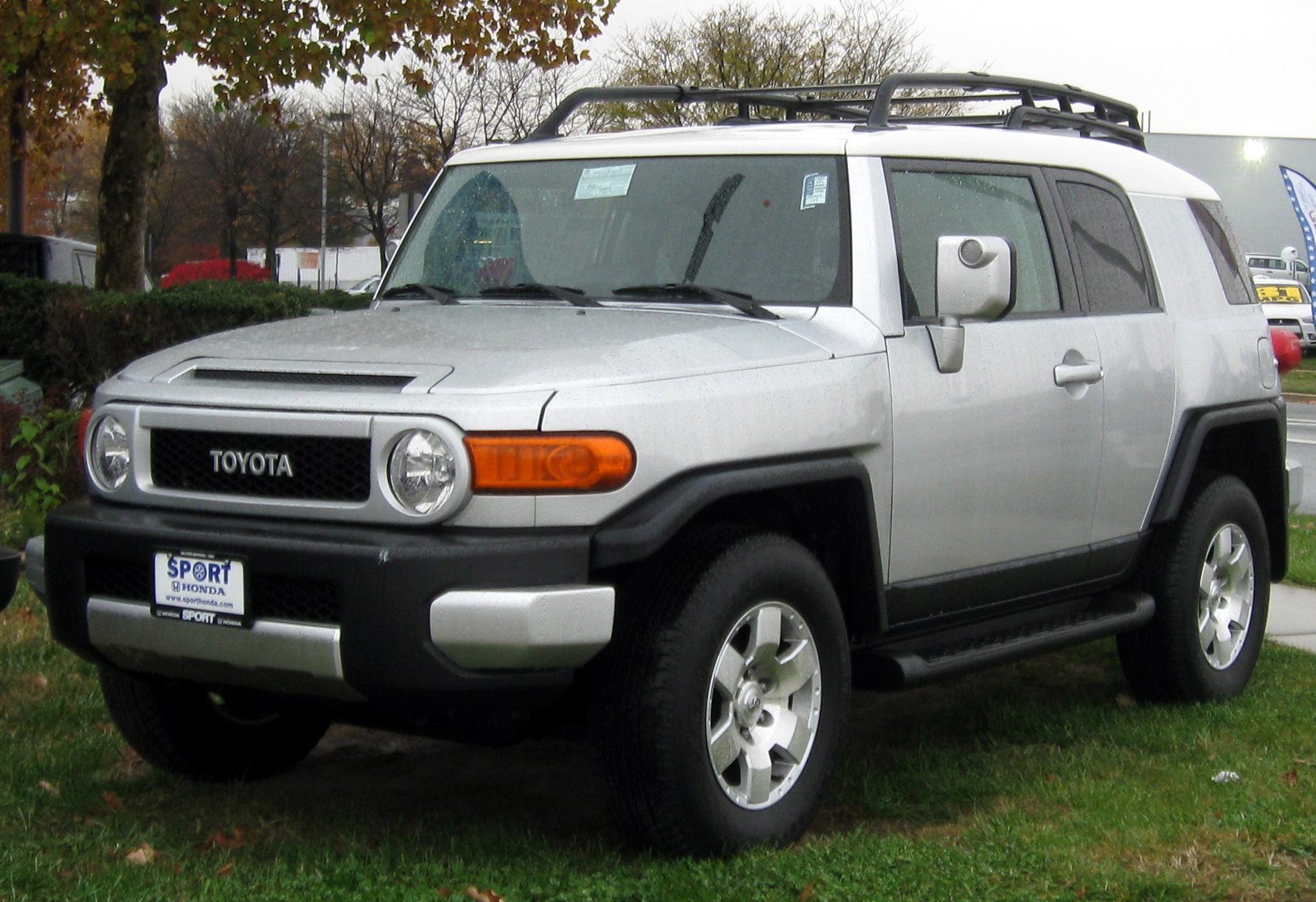
Toyota FJ Cruiser - front view

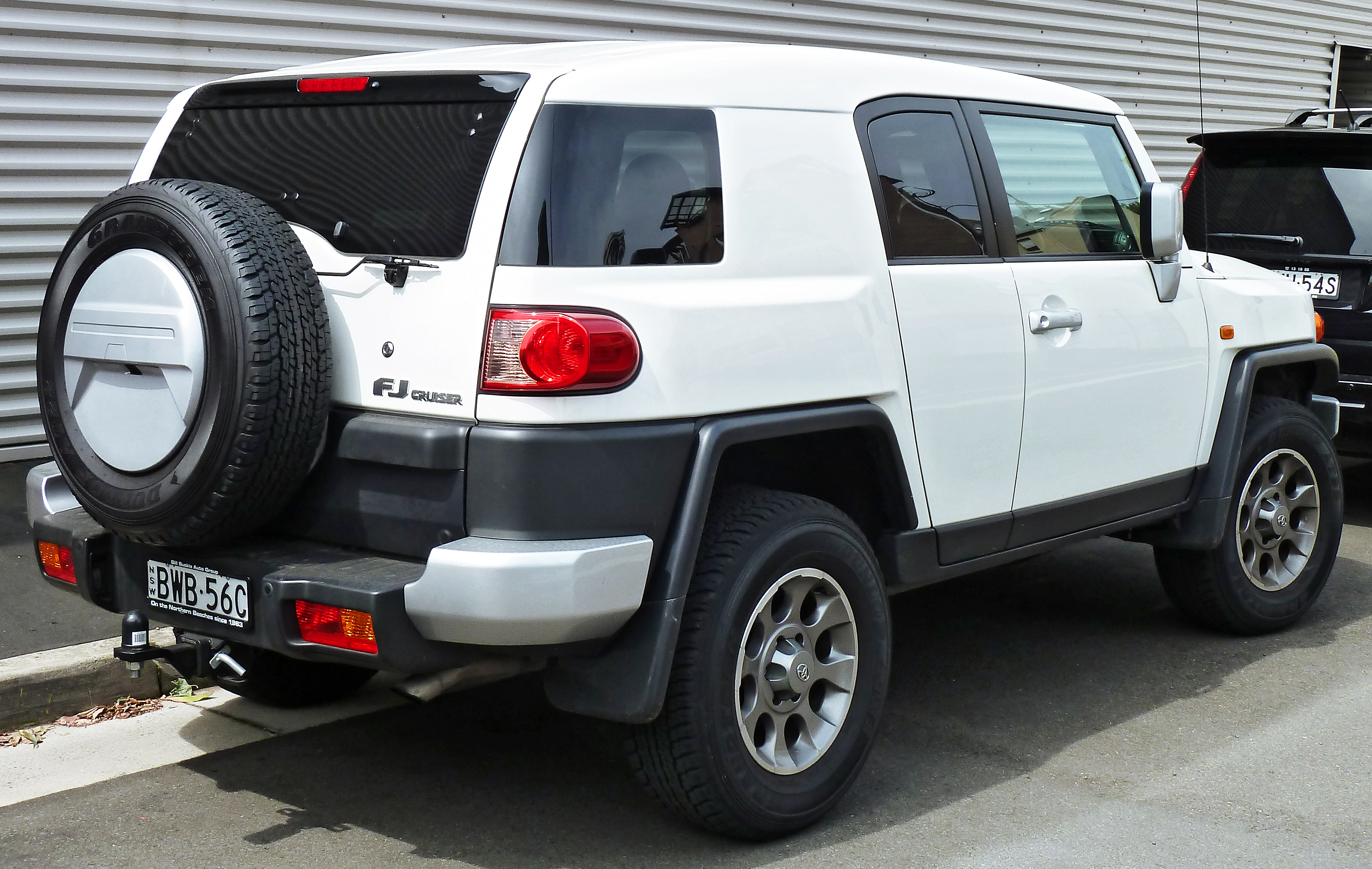
Toyota FJ Cruiser - rear view

Toyota still offers many replacement parts for the J40, available through Toyota parts departments worldwide.

In 2006, Toyota introduced the FJ Cruiser, a modern SUV with styling paying homage to the J40 Land Cruiser. The FJ Cruiser (FJC) went on sale in the spring of 2006.
