= Ibrahim Kulaylat =

Lebanese politician

- إبراهيم قليلات
- Born: 1940 (age 85–86); Lebanon
- Occupations: Politician, Founder of the Independent Nasserist Movement (Al-Mourabitoun)
- Years active: 1957–present
- Era: Lebanese Civil War, post-independence Lebanon
- Known for: Leadership during Lebanese Civil War, alliance with Palestine Liberation Organization (PLO)
- Notable work: Leadership during Lebanese Civil War, alliance with Palestine Liberation Organization (PLO)

Ibrahim Kulaylat (Arabic: إبراهيم قليلات; born 1940) is a Lebanese politician and founder of the Independent Nasserist Movement (known as Al-Mourabitoun), established in 1957-58. He organized a multi-confessional militia, consisted specially of Sunni, Shia Muslims and left-wing Christians. This militia numbered more than 3,000 fighters and took an active part in the Lebanese War of 1982 in alliance with the Palestine Liberation Organization (PLO) led by Yasser Arafat, also cooperating with the other left-wing parties to form the Lebanese National Movement against the parties of the Lebanese right with Christian majority.

In 1982 al-Mourabitoun militia defended Beirut, besieged by the Israeli army over a period of 3 months. It continued its dogged resistance to the occupation up to the withdrawal of Israeli troops from the Lebanese capital.

In 1985 his former allies in the Progressive Socialist Party and the Amal group, under pressure from the Syrian government, took advantage of his exile in France and turned against him after he had allied himself with the Lebanese Army.

From that time onwards, he chose exile and did not play a part in the Lebanese political scene. In 2001, his party was reorganised and renewed its alliances with the other Lebanese parties, but since the intensification of the political crisis in Lebanon and following the murder of Lebanese ex-Prime Minister Rafic Hariri, numerous rumours hinted at his return to the country.
