= Human trafficking in Lebanon =

Lebanon ratified the 2000 UN TIP Protocol in October 2005.

In 2008, Lebanon was a destination for Asian and African women trafficked for the purpose of domestic servitude, and for Eastern European and Syrian women trafficked for the purpose of commercial sexual exploitation. Lebanese children were trafficked within the country for the purpose of commercial sexual exploitation and forced labor in the metal works, construction, and agriculture sectors. Women from Sri Lanka, the Philippines, and Ethiopia migrated to Lebanon legally, but often found themselves in conditions of forced labor, through unlawful withholding of passports, non-payment of wages, restrictions on movement, threats, and physical or sexual assault. During the armed conflict in July 2006, Sri Lankan domestic workers reported being restricted from leaving the country by their employers. Eastern European and Syrian women came to Lebanon on "artiste" visas, but some became victims of trafficking for commercial sexual exploitation when they are subjected to coercive acts such as unlawful withholding of passports, restrictions on movement, threats, and physical assault.

Since the refugee crisis in Syria, the sex trade and trafficking of Syrian girls and women has increased in Lebanon.

Since the non stop Lebanese economic crisis and increase in poverty, Lebanese women and girls are vulnerable of being subjected to sex trafficking into other Arab countries.

In 2008 the Government of Lebanon did not fully comply with the minimum standards for the elimination of trafficking; however, it made significant efforts to do so. Although it reported 17 prosecutions in 2007, the government failed to convict or criminally punish anyone for trafficking offenses, despite ample evidence of conditions of forced labor. In addition, the government continued to lack victim protection services or a formal system to ensure that victims are not punished.

In 2017, the Internal Security Forces (ISF) stated that 29 victims of sex trafficking had been identified, but the International Organisation for Migration (IOM), the United Nations High Commissioner for Refugees (UNHCR) and NGOs estimate the number of victims to be in the thousands.

The U.S. State Department's Office to Monitor and Combat Trafficking in Persons placed the country in "Tier 2" in 2017.

In 2019, the US State Department continued to classify the country as Tier 2 because the minimum standards for eliminating trafficking were not fully met. However, it was recognised that the government was making significant efforts to achieve this. For example, its partnership~~s~~ with NGOs (like Caritas) had been strengthened and the investigation of suspected trafficking cases has been stepped up.

In 2023, the country was placed on the Tier 2 Watch List. In the same year, the Organised Crime Index noted the country’s collaboration with international agencies to combat human trafficking and human smuggling.

== Prosecution (2008) ==
Lebanon did not make significant efforts to prosecute or criminally punish trafficking offenses during the reporting period. Lebanon prohibits forced prostitution through Article 524 of its penal code; prescribed punishment under this statute is imprisonment for at least one year. In addition, commercial sexual exploitation of a person under 21 years old is prohibited by Article 523 of the penal code; the prescribed penalty for violation is imprisonment of one month to one year. The Lebanese Penal Code does not specifically prohibit forced labor, but Article 569's prohibition against deprivation of an individual's liberty to perform a task could be used to prosecute forced labor; the prescribed penalty under this statute is temporary hard labor. The prescribed penalties for acts of sex trafficking are not commensurate with those for other grave crimes, such as rape, and the prescribed penalties for prostitution of children and forced labor are not sufficiently stringent. Due to political constraints, during the reporting period, no legislation could be passed in Lebanon, on trafficking or otherwise. Domestic workers are not protected under Lebanese labor law provisions. Despite the availability of these statutes and laws against physical and sexual assault, the government reported no criminal prosecutions, convictions, or punishments for trafficking offenses; this represents a significant decrease from the 17 prosecutions reported last year. Although police arrested one employer for attempting to murder his domestic worker by beating her severely with a hammer on her back, shoulders, and hands, he was later released without a prison sentence in exchange for giving the worker $6,500; the case is being investigated. Under its administrative laws, the government suspended the licenses of 11 recruitment agencies and closed two for, among other violations, physically abusing workers; nonetheless, no recruitment agent was criminally prosecuted or punished for the abuse. Moreover, despite widespread reports of withholding of passports - a potential indicator of forced labor - the government did not report enforcing laws against this practice. Lebanon similarly did not report any prosecutions, convictions, or punishments for the forced labor or commercial sexual exploitation of children. Despite receiving 31 reports of physical abuse, rape, and withheld wages among adult club employees, these cases were settled out of court, and did not result in any prosecutions or convictions for trafficking offenses.

== Protection (2008) ==
The Government of Lebanon did not make sufficient efforts to protect victims of trafficking during the reporting period. Though government officials received training on victim interview techniques paid for by UNODC and the NGO Caritas Lebanon, the government does not have a formal procedure to identify victims of trafficking among vulnerable populations, such as foreigners arrested for immigration violations or prostitution. As a result, victims of trafficking were likely punished for acts committed as a result of being trafficked, as foreign workers without valid residency and work permits are subject to arrest, detention, and deportation. Consistent with government regulations, it remains common for employers to force a domestic worker who breaks her contract to repay residency and work permit fees, or pay for a paper releasing her from her contract; there is no exception for workers who break their contracts due to their employers’ abuse. Victims are neither encouraged to participate in trials, nor offered legal alternatives to deportation to countries where they would face hardship or retribution. Rather, victims are often deported home before being given the opportunity to testify against their traffickers. Lebanon does not offer protection services to victims of trafficking; the government, however, referred nine trafficking victims to NGO shelters during the reporting period.

== Prevention (2008) ==
Lebanon made minimal efforts to prevent trafficking in persons. The government partnered with an NGO to produce a public awareness campaign on migrant workers’ rights. In August, the Sûreté General and Ministry of Labor met with recruitment agencies to warn them against trafficking workers. The government did not take any steps to reduce the demand for commercial sex acts in Lebanon. The government similarly did not institute a public awareness campaign targeting citizens traveling to known child sex tourism destinations.
