= Raymond Azar =

General and former head of Lebanese military intelligence

- Born: Raymond Azar; 1953 (age 72–73); Jezzine, Lebanon
- Occupations: General and former head of military intelligence

Raymond Azar (Arabic: رايموند أزار; born 1953) was the head of the Lebanese military intelligence.

== Early life and education ==
Raymond Azar was born into a Maronite family in the mostly Christian village of Machmouche in 1953. He studied to be a priest before joining the army.

== Career ==
Azar was appointed to head of military intelligence in 1998 when Emile Lahoud was elected president. He was at this post at the time of Hariri assassination.

== Controversy ==
Raymond Azar fell under suspicion of playing a role in the 2005 assassination of Rafiq Hariri a former prime minister of Lebanon. The Mehlis report included a witness as indicating that Azar, like Mustafa Hamdan, provided logistical support for the assassination. He and other three generals including Jamil Al Sayyed were arrested on 30 August 2005. They were held in Roumieh prison, northeast of Beirut from 2005 to April 2009. It is argued that first loyalty of all four generals was to Syrian government rather than Lebanese government. They all were released in April 2009 due to lack of evidence.
