= Roumieh Prison =

Prison in Lebanon

Roumieh prison (Arabic: سجن رومية) is the largest and most notorious prison in Lebanon, located in Roumieh, Matn district. It was designed to hold 1,050 inmates, though as of 2017 is extremely overcrowded and at about 300% capacity; this represents nearly half the prisoners in Lebanon. Roumieh Prison holds convicted prisoners and prisoners on remand. It holds juveniles, women and men, all in separate sections.

== History ==
Roumieh prison was built in late 1960s, and was inaugurated in 1970 to host 1,500 prisoners.

Although regarded as one of the best correctional facilities in Lebanon, Roumieh prison still lacks the minimum requirements to meet United Nations standards.

On April 7, 2011, a mutiny erupted in a wing of the prison and prisoners armed with makeshift knives held five prison guards as hostages. Security officials stated that the initial protest was fueled by both the unfair imprisonment of a detainee found innocent by the Lebanese justice as well as the poor conditions of detention. The mutiny was contained after security forces reached a compromise with the detainees.

On January 12, 2015, Lebanese security forces stormed the building designated to Islamist prisoners in Roumieh prison, where clashes occurred between the two parties. According to the Ministry of Interior statement, the prisoners rioted and set fires in protest against the security measures implemented by the security guards.

== See also ==
- 12 Angry Lebanese, a 2009 documentary filmed inside the prison
- Qubbah prison
- Yarze prison
- Capernaum (film)
