= Khatoun Salma =

Lebanese poet

- Died: April 8, 2026; Beirut, Lebanon
- Occupation: Poet

Khatoun Salma (died April 8, 2026) was a Lebanese poet, the author of two poetry collections published by Dar al Jadeed, in 2009 and 2012. She was killed in an Israeli airstrike alongside her husband on April 8, 2026 in Beirut's neighbourhood of Tallet al-Khayyat.
