= Umam Documentation & Research =

Nonprofit cultural organization in Lebanon

Coordinates: 33°51′30″N 35°30′29″E

Umam Documentation & Research أمـم للتوثيق والأبحاث
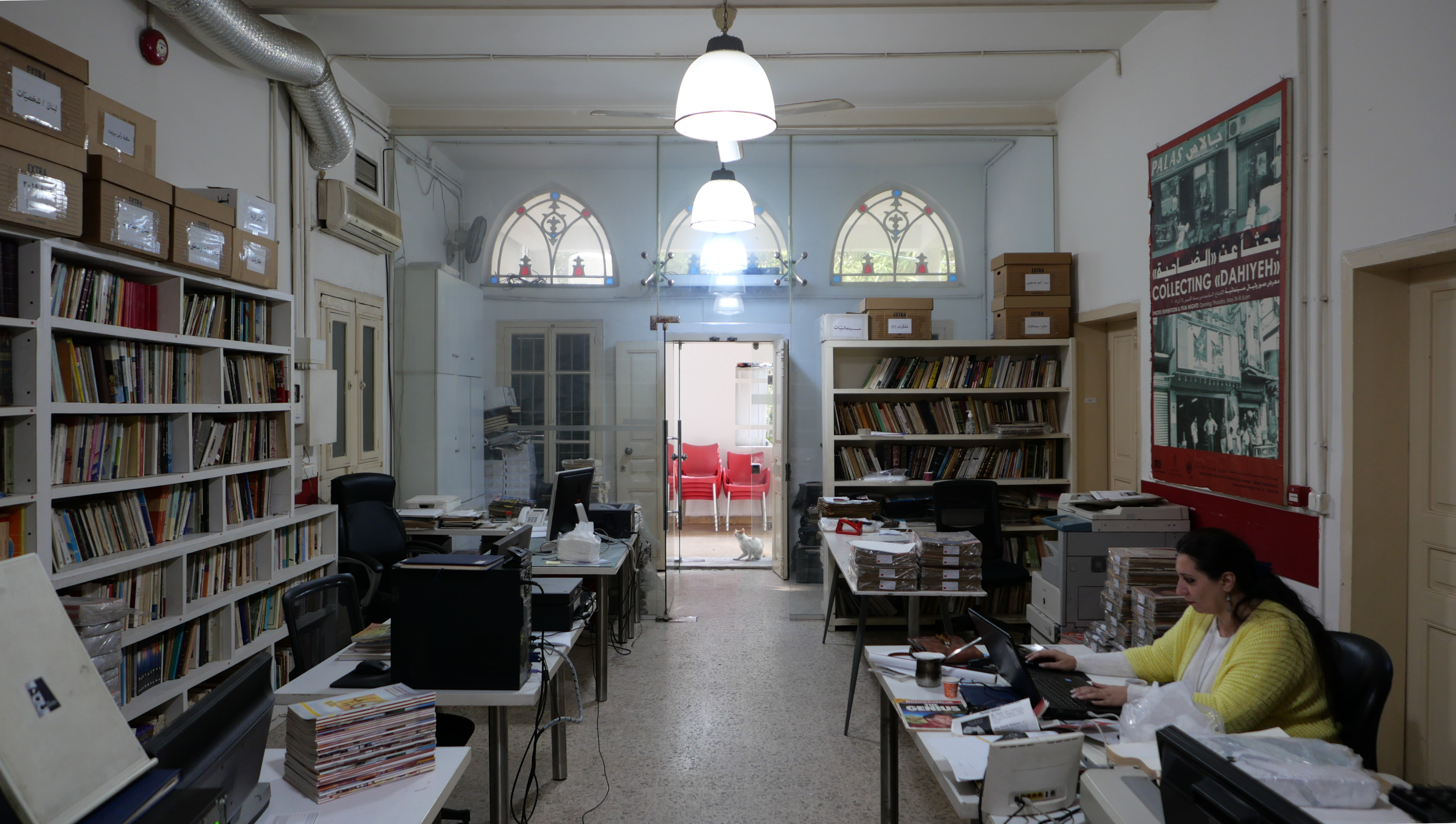
- Founded: 2004
- Founder: Lokman Slim; Monika Borgmann
- Type: Non-profit
- Location: Haret Hreik, Dahieh (Lebanon)
- Website: http://www.umam-dr.org

UMAM Documentation and Research (UMAM D&R) is a nonprofit cultural organization founded in 2004 by Lokman Slim and Monika Borgmann. It is located in Haret Hreik, a town part of the Dahieh Southern suburb of Beirut, Lebanon, that was heavily bombed during the 2006 Lebanon War. UMAM D&R works towards raising awareness of civil violence and war memories in Lebanon.

== Documentation and Archive ==
Umam handles archival documents related to Lebanon from 1840 till today and has assembled a vast collection that ranges from materials such as books, newspapers, leaflets, posters, videos and magazines, to personal and official documents, narratives, interviews, and various types of “gray” or uncategorized but related information, in order to document Lebanon's recent social and cultural history. Umam has initiated several projects and events in order to promote their collection.

== The Hangar ==
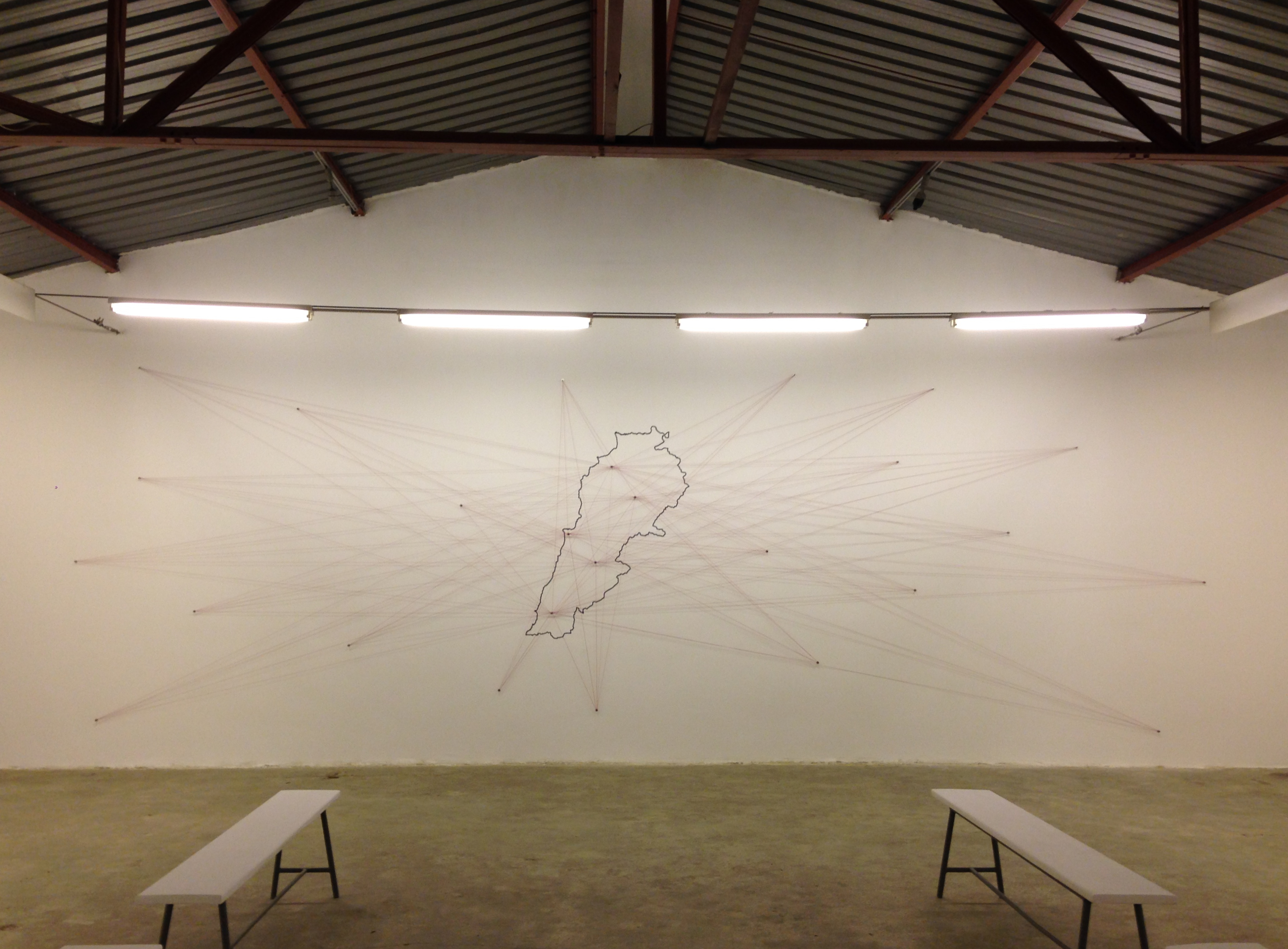
The Hangar in 2018

The hangar is a former warehouse for fruits and vegetable, adjacent to the villa housing Umam D&R. It opened in 2005 as a cultural venue for art exhibitions and films. It suffered of light damage during the 2006 war and was refurbished.

The hangar featured events with numerous artists including Marwa Arsanios, Houssam Boukeili, Gregory Buchakjian, Sophie Calle & Walid Raad, Omar Fakhoury, Sirine Fattouh, Gilbert Hage, Nathalie Harb, Maxime Hourani, Hatem Imam, Lady Lena Kelekian, Jeroen Kramer, Ilaria Lupo, Noel Nasr, Cynthia Nohra, Estefania Penafiel Loaiza, Amal Saade, Stephanie Saade, Walid Sadek, Roy Samaha, Nada Sehnaoui, Siska, Souheil Sleiman, Alfred Tarazi, Karine Wehbe and Raed Yassin.
