= Rasha al Ameer =

Lebanese publisher, cultural critic and novelist

Rasha al Ameer is a Lebanese novelist and publisher. She is best known for her novel in Arabic, The Last Day (2002), and as co-founder with her brother Lokman Slim of the publishing house Dar al-Jadeed.

== Biography ==
Rasha Al-Ameer, by her birth name Rasha Slim, was born to a Lebanese father and a her mother (Salma Merchak) was born in Egypt to a Syrian father and a Lebanese mother. Her father was a member of the Lebanese parliament. She flew with her family the country for France during the Lebanese civil war, where she studied history and fine arts

Having become a journalist for An-Nahar International and Al-Watan al-Arabi, she then adopted the pseudonym of Rasha Al-Ameer.

After returning to Lebanon in 1990, she and her brother, Lebanese writer and translator Lokman Slim, founded in Beirut the publishing house Dâr al-Jadeed, · which publishes works of fiction, poetry and essays, sometimes in a bilingual version. Dar al-Jadeed, published for example, Arabic authors such as the poet Mahmoud Darwich, the writers Taha Hussein and Malika Oufkir, the novelist Inaam Kachachi, as well as European authors translated into Arabic such as René Char, Emil Cioran, Jean Tardieu or Paul Celan.

R. al Ameer perfected her skill in classical Arabic by studying with an imam, deepened her knowledge in theology and became more acquainted with Arabic poetry, specially the work of the 10th century Iraqi poet Al-Mutanabbi. At the end of this initiation, she published a novel in 2002 entitled The Last Day. Confession of an Imam (original title: Yawm al-dîn), translated into English, French, and Italian. The work traces the psychological evolution of a man who, following his encounter with a beloved woman, has a new look at the world and overcomes his inhibitions. The story also deals with social themes such as the relationship between religion and modernity, between Islam and the state.

Al-Ameer published two playful tales, Petit Pays (2008, in French), which deals with Lebanon, and Kitab al-hamza (2011), which deals with Arabic grammar.

== Works ==
=== The Last day ===
An imam from an Arab country recounts his life. After having been accused of apostasy and threatened with death by his enemies—fundamentalists—who also promulgated a fatwa against him, he had to remain in a barrack under the protection of the police. Writing a long letter to the woman who introduced him to love, and from whom he is separated, allows him to break the isolation in which his situation condemns him.

The character recalls his poor family background. He studied at a Koranic school where a reforming ulema (theologian), having recognised his talent, appointed him to carry out a delicate mission in a foreign country which is not named, but which can be identified as Lebanon. There, the imam must try to contain the rise of fundamentalism in the mosque under his responsibility. Close to official Islam, he gave sermons on television which earned him great popularity. His life changes when he responds to the solicitations of a young woman from a cosmopolitan background, with a modern lifestyle, who has undertaken to establish an index of the work of a 10th century Arab poet, Al- Mutanabbi. The book relates the nocturnal exchanges between the imam and the woman, in which the reading of poems promotes the birth of love and the blossoming of desire.

A distinctive feature of the novel is the use of classical Arabic · which brings “a remote flavor to the exposition of hot topics such as sex, religion, politics and celebrity” according to literary critic Marcia Lynx Qualey. The book's English translator, Jonathan Wright, also compares the novel's style to that of Jane Austen, due to the frequency of long sentences, meticulous attention to detail, and taste for psychological analysis.

=== Petit pays ===
Petit pays is a story in French; this children's book evokes the history of a small country ignored by geographers. Seen from afar, the country looks like a paradise, but in reality, life there is hell. Coveted by its neighbours, it is the scene of merciless wars. While its inhabitants were considering war as inevitable, birds carry this small country on their wings, far from its turbulent neighbors, towards a “region that only birds can reach”, and where it finds a sense of harmony. The story of the “little country” is an allegory of Lebanon unfolded in a poetic style.

=== Kitab al-Hamza ===
Al-Ameer devotes a book, Treatise on the hamza, to a sign of the Arabic alphabet, the hamza, which transcribes a glottal plosive consonant, or "glottis stop". It is “the most controversial sign of the Arabic language”. This consonant is not considered as a letter; it is sometimes pronounced, sometimes elided, stable or unstable depending on the case. The book is, according to L'Orient littéraire, a “playful tale”, which can make one think of a poem by Jacques Prévert.] The hamza plays the role of a full-fledged character who initiate a young schoolboy to its multiple positions on the line of writing, "well seated on its seat, wandering, lonely on the calligraphic line, or anchored to a letter (the wāw), perched on another (the alif) when it is not nailed to its boot». Several Arab grammarians are summoned during the story, such as Khalil ibn Ahmad, Sîbawayh, Abu al-Aswad al-Du'ali.

== Awards ==
Rasha Al-Ameer received as a co-founder of the Dar al Jadeed publishing house the Voltaire Prize from the International Publishers Association, in November 2021; the prize is also awarded to her brother Lokman Slim, assassinated in 2021, whose murder is attributed to Hezbollah. Rasha Al-Ameer received in April 2021 from the Abu Dhabi Arabic Language Center, the Sheikh Zayed Book Award in the category Publishing and Technology Award, which recognizes the publishing house Dar al Jadeed.

== Works ==
- Yawm al-din, Beirut: Dar Al-Jadeed, 2002.
- Translated into French by Youssef Seddik as Le dernier jour: confessions d'un imam, Paris: Actes Sud, 2009.
- Translated into English by Jonathan Wright. Judgment Day: A Modern Arabic Novel, Oxford University Press, 2011.

== Bibliography ==
- « Ameer, Rasha Al- », dans Collectif; Fouque, Antoinette; Calle-Gruber, Mireille; Didier, Béatrice (2015-11-26). Le Dictionnaire universel des créatrices (in French). Éditions des femmes. ISBN 978-2-7210-0651-6.
- "Rasha Slim, l'Antigone libanaise ?". L'Orient-Le Jour. 2021-02-15.
- “"Le Jour dernier. Confession d'un imam", de Rasha Al-Ameer : par la foi de l'amour”, Le Monde.fr, 2009-06-18
- البكر, بشير. "رشا الأمير الساكنة في الكلمة.. بيتها الأبديّ". almodon (in Arabic).
- Ordine, di Nuccio (2017-08-21). "L'intolleranza trasformata in dialogo dalla letteratura e dall'amore. La rivoluzione di Rasha Al-Ameer". Corriere della Sera (in Italian).
- "Banipal (UK) Magazine of Modern Arab Literature - Book Reviews - Yawm al-Din (Judgment Day)". www.banipal.co.uk.
- "La lingua salvata | L'impresa di tradurre un romanzo contemporaneo scritto in arabo classico". Linkiesta.it (in Italian). 2021-02-04.
- Tondi, Arianna (2021-02-14). "Rasha al-Amir, scrivere è impegno civile | Left" (in Italian).
