= Dar al Jadeed =

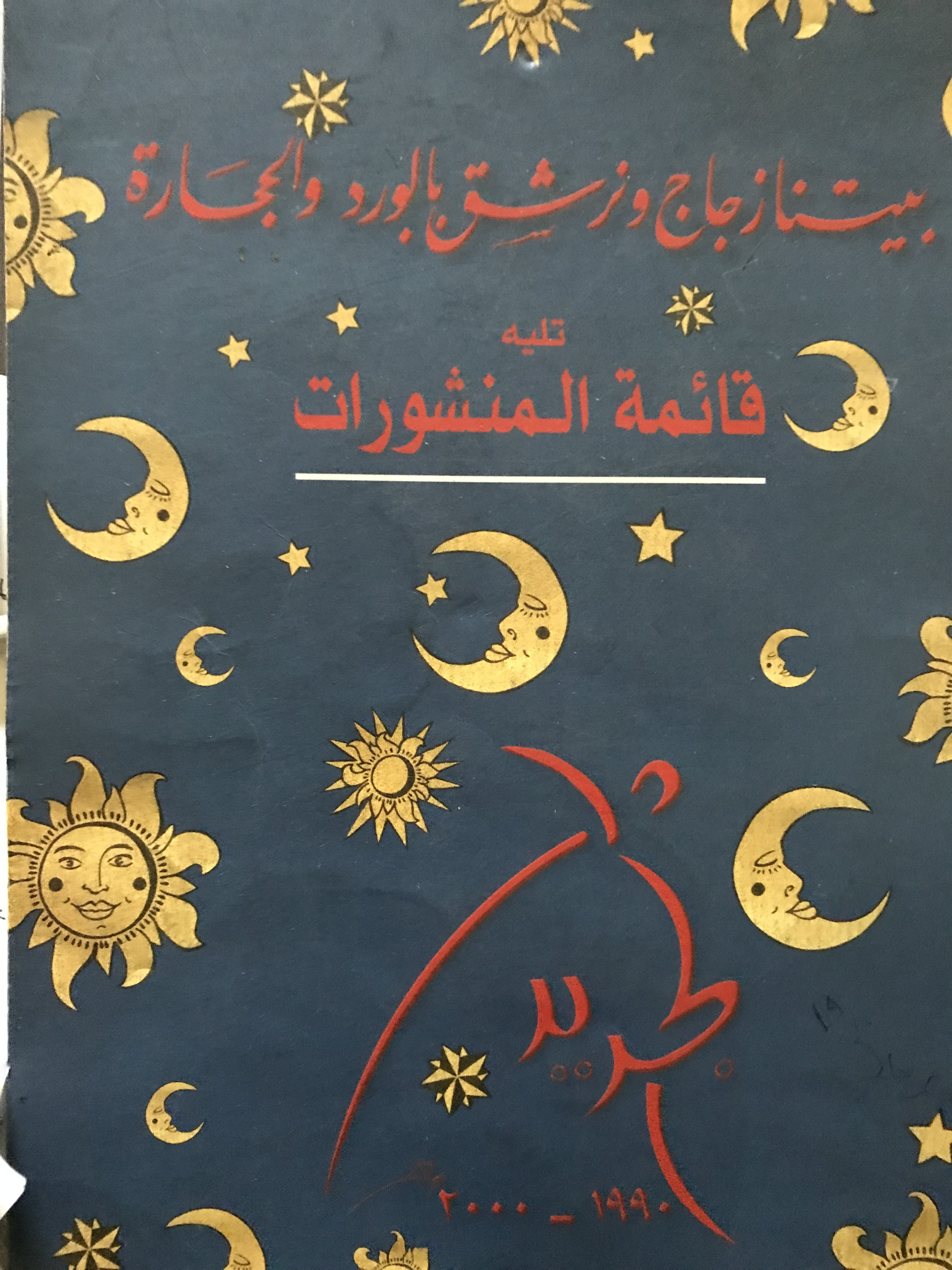
Dar al Jadeed catalogue.

Dar al Jadeed is a Lebanese publishing house based in Beirut. It was co-founded in 2000 by political activist and commentator Lokman Slim and his sister, novelist Rasha al Ameer.

Lokman was killed in February 2021. In November of that year, the company won the Prix Voltaire from the International Publishers Association (IPA). The IPA's then-president, Bodour bint Sultan bin Mohammed Al Qasimi, explained, "This year’s Prix Voltaire laureate paid the ultimate price standing up for freedom of expression as an enabler of tolerance and conflict resolution in Lebanon. His loss is a loss to the entire international publishing community."
