= Monika Borgmann =

German-Lebanese journalist (born 1963)

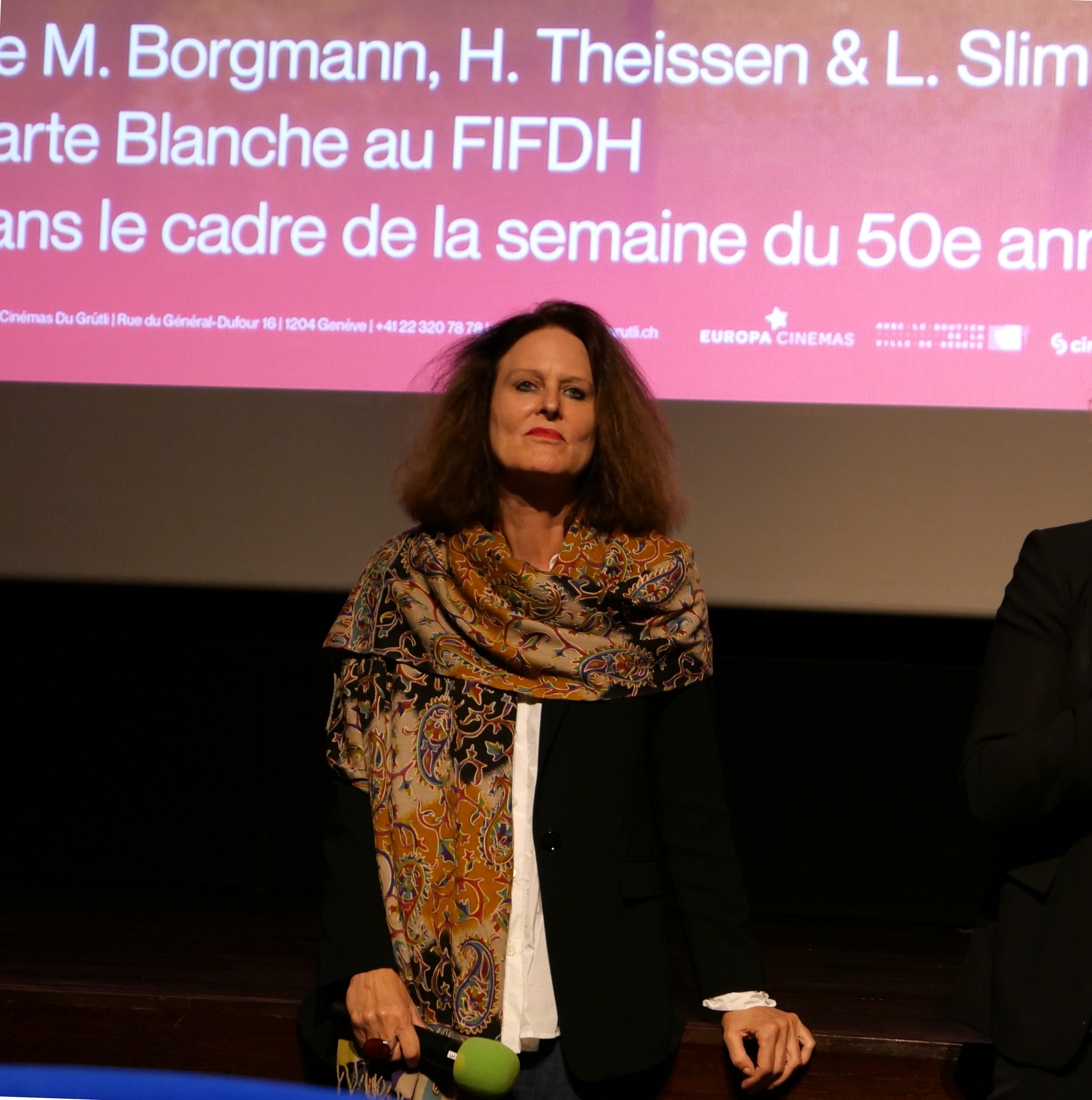
- Borgmann in 2022 at the International Film Festival and Forum on Human Rights in Geneva
- Born: 25 November 1963 (age 62); Aachen, Germany
- Education: University of Bonn
- Occupations: journalist; filmmaker
- Spouse: Lokman Slim
- Website: umam-dr.org

Monika Borgmann-Slim (born 25 November 1963) is a German-Lebanese journalist, award-winning documentary filmmaker, and archivist. She is an activist against what she describes as Lebanon's culture of impunity and Vergangenheitsbewältigung, countering official amnesia about the Lebanese Civil War (1975–1990). She is the widow of the Lebanese filmmaker, archivist and activist Lokman Slim, who was assassinated in 2021.

== Life ==
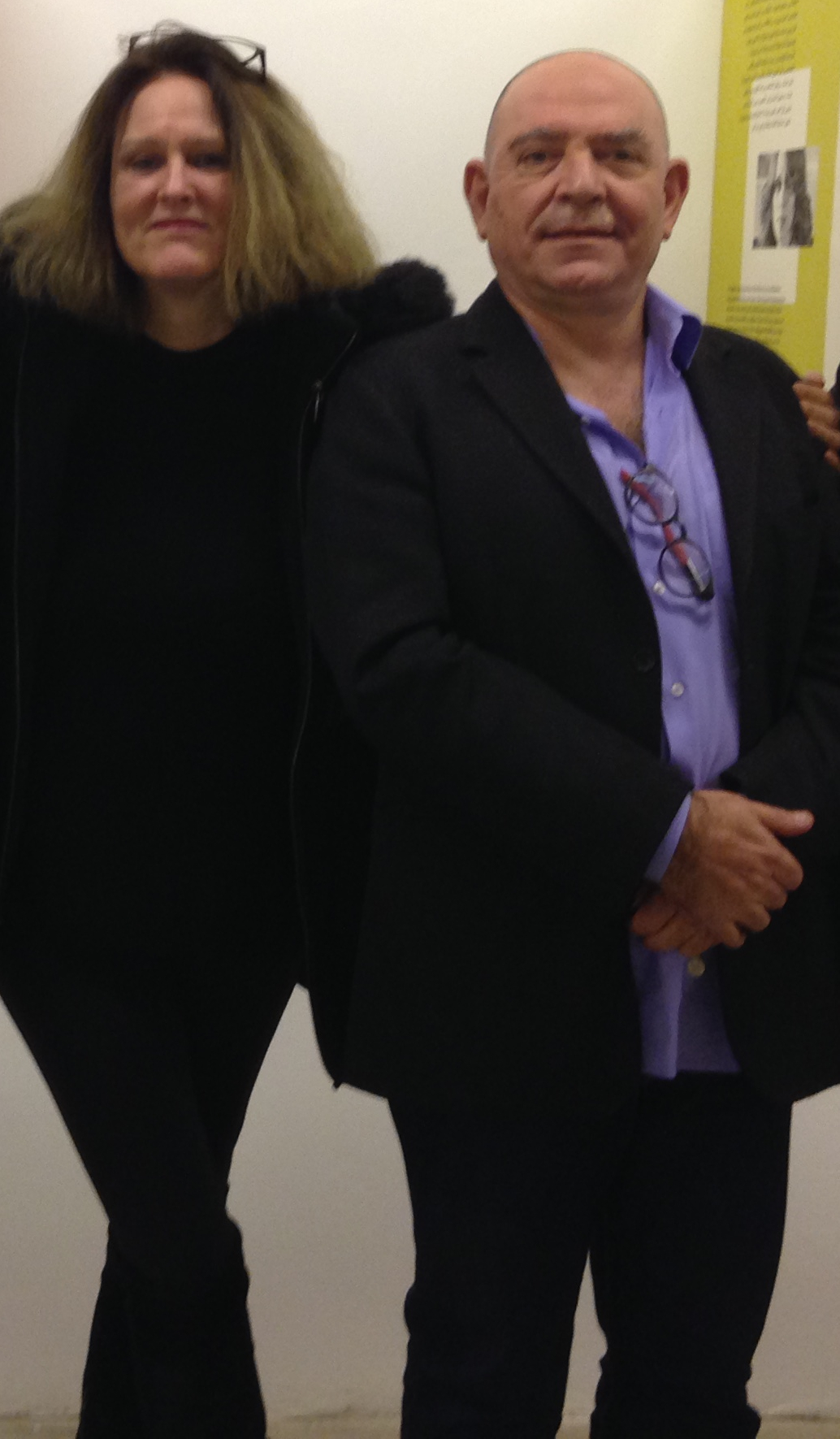
Borgmann and Slim in 2018 at the "Hangar" on their UMAM D&R compound during the exhibition "In Praise of Lebanese Fusion" about the multi-cultural and foreign roots of many prominent artists in Lebanon. In the background is a photo of the super-star singer Fairuz.

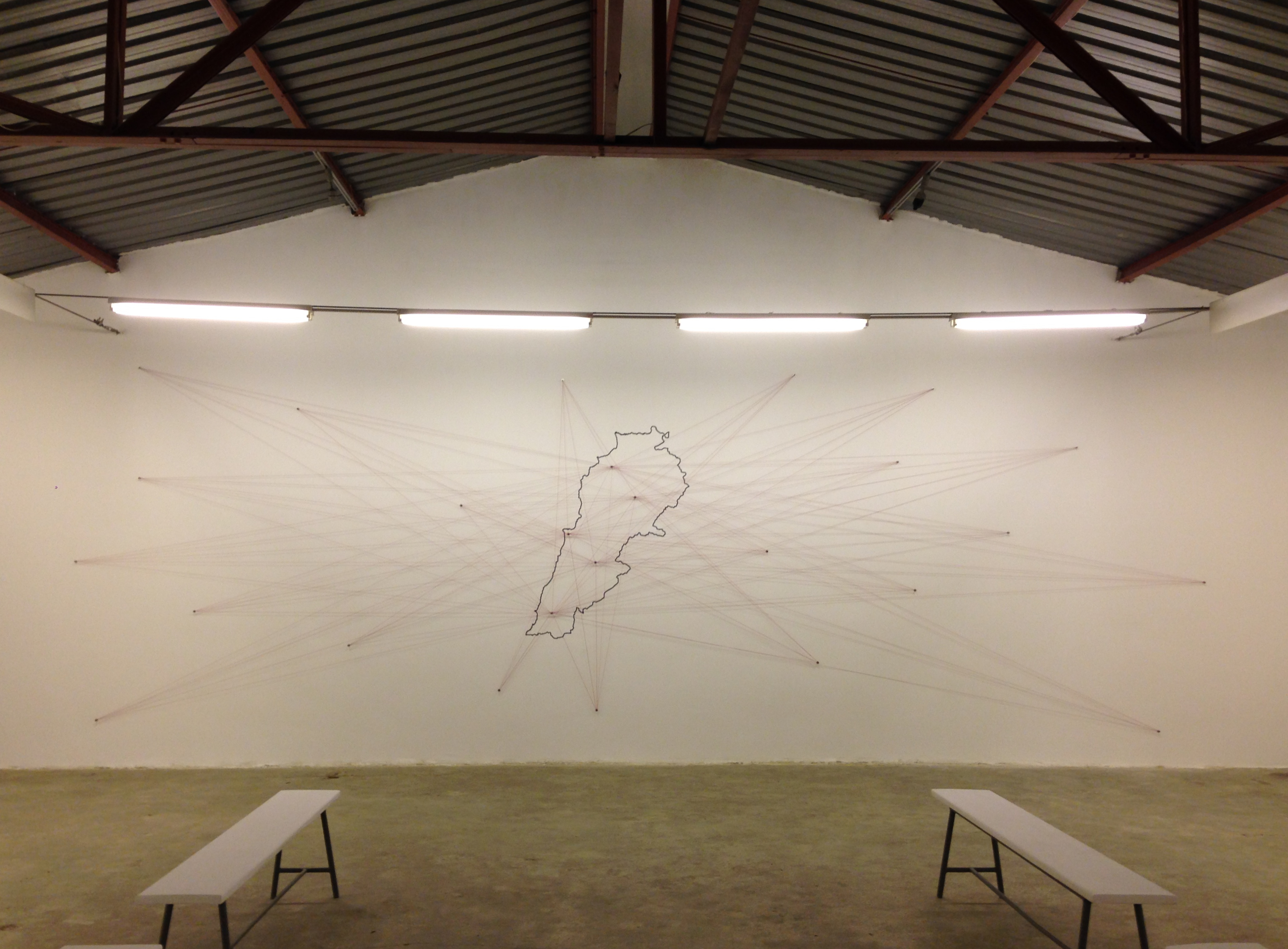
The Hangar exhibition hall with an artistic map of Lebanon on the wall

Born in Aachen, the westernmost city in Germany at the borders with Belgium and the Netherlands, Borgmann studied Arabic philology and political science at the University of Bonn which was then the capital of West Germany. In the context of these studies she spent a year in 1986/87 in Damascus, Syria, focussing on Islamic studies. From there she visited Beirut for the first time, when Lebanon was 10 years into the civil war and its capital devastated by heavy fighting.

After graduating from university, Borgmann started working as a freelance journalist in 1988. Upon the recommendation of Rupert Neudeck (1939–2016), a journalist and prominent humanitarian activist, Borgmann produced her first radio feature about daily life in wartime Beirut. In 1990 she moved to Cairo from where she mainly produced radio features for the ARD, the joint organisation of Germany's regional public-service broadcasters. In addition, she wrote for the German weekly newspaper Die Zeit and other publications like TransAtlantik and Lettre International.

In 1992, Borgmann returned to Lebanon for the first time since the official end of the civil war with a project to portray former snipers. At the same time, she moved into the field of documentary films, when she worked as a location manager during the production of the documentary Balagan by German director Andreas Veiel about the Jewish-Palestinian acting troupe Akko.

In early 2001, Borgmann moved from Cairo to Beirut for a film project about the 1982 Sabra and Shatila massacre that was perpetrated by Phalanges militia fighters who killed up to 3,500 civilians, mostly Palestinian refugees and Lebanese Shiites. In June 2001, the Syrian journalist and human rights activist Ali al-Atassi introduced Borgmann to the publisher Lokman Slim, who was one year older than her. Hailing from an influential family in the now Shiite-dominated southern part of Beirut, he had studied philosophy and Ancient Greek at Sorbonne University in Paris during the 1980s. Still in 2001, both Borgman and Slim became professional partners by founding UMAM Productions as well as private partners. Following their wedding in 2004 Borgmann also obtained Lebanese citizenship.

For four years, Borgmann and Slim worked on their documentary project about the perpetrators of the Sabra and Shatila massacres. When their first interview partners got arrested and the filmmakers themselves were taken in for interrogation by the Lebanese security forces, Borgmann and Slim started working underground. The couple found six former militia men who took part in the slaughter and convinced them to tell their accounts on camera, while protecting their identities. In 2005, Borgman and Slim presented Massaker (Massacre) with their co-director Hermann Theißen (1954–2016) for the world premiere in the Panorama section of the Berlin International Film Festival, which stressed in its film file:

Drawing a parallel between the protagonists' psychological disposition and their political environment, the film uses the perpetrators’ narratives to address the phenomenon of collective violence per se.

UMAM D&R

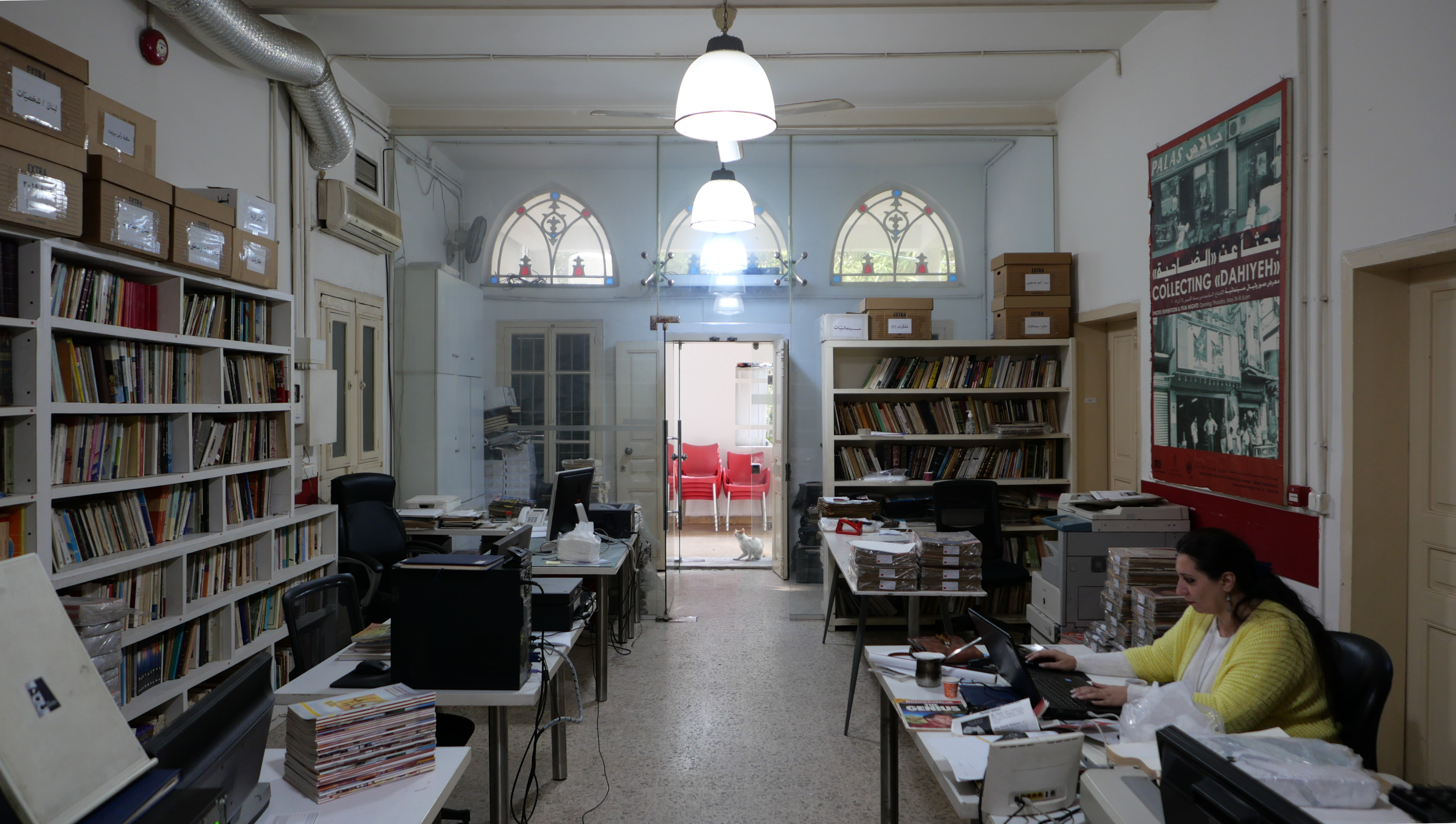
The entrance hall

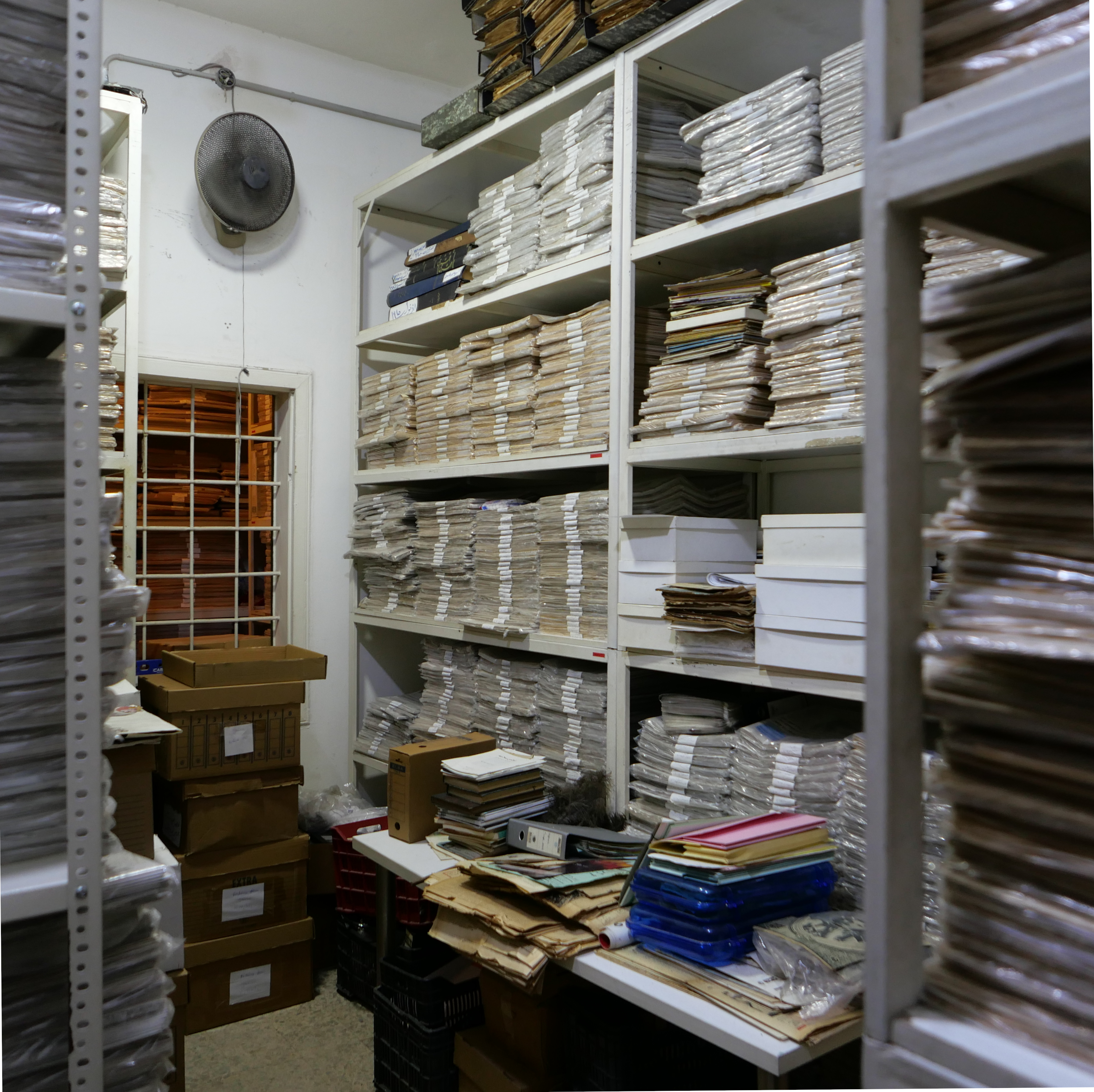
Newspaper & magazine archives

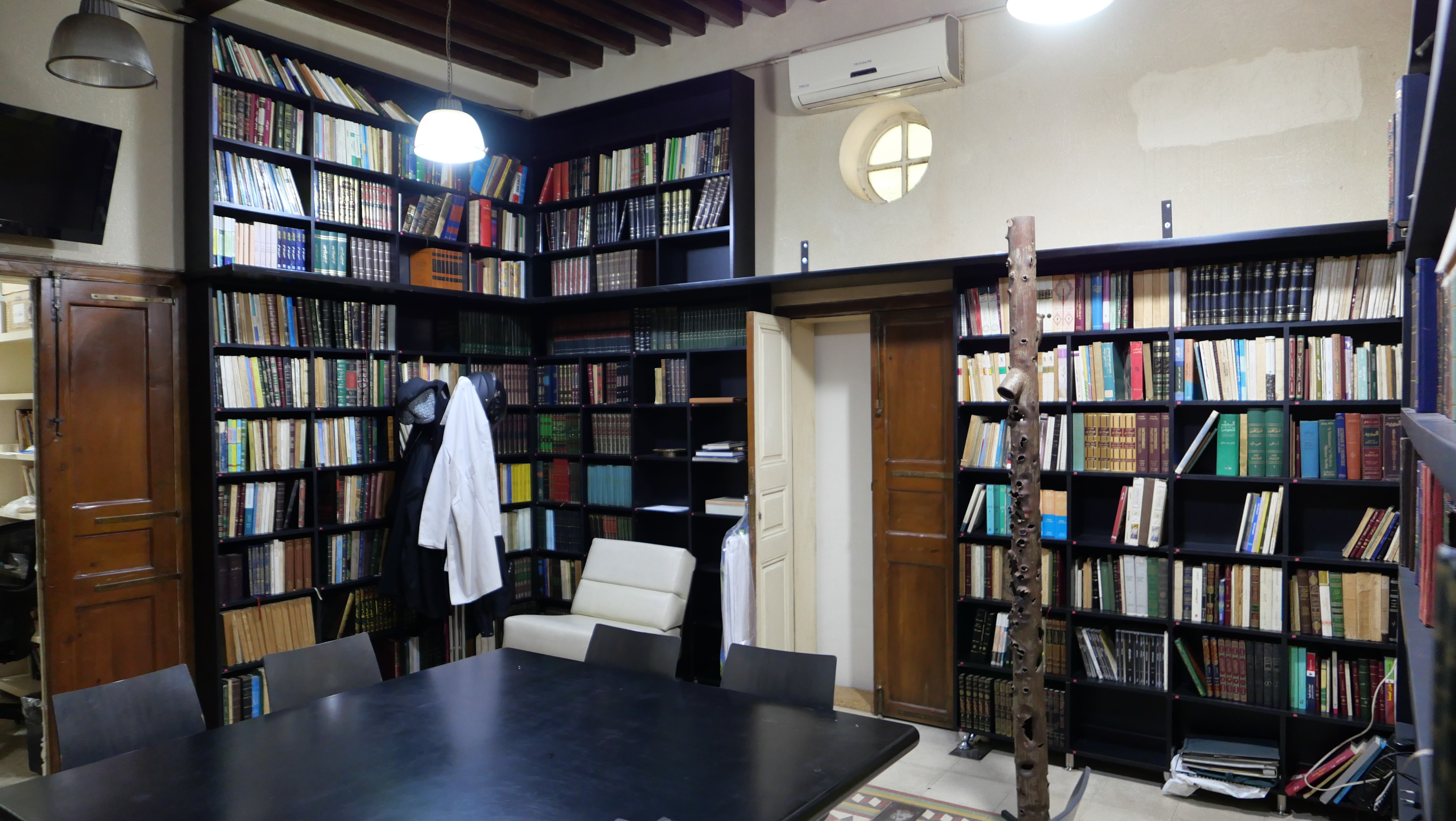
Slim's office with his jackets still hanging in the wardrobe as he left it on the day of his assassination. To the right is lamppost which was riddled by bullets at a Beirut frontline during the civil war.

The film won the Panorama-award of the International Film Critics Association (Fédération Internationale de la Presse Cinématographique – FIPRESCI), with the jury arguing that

It leads its audience in an inevitable claustrophobic experience with its extreme concentration on the language of murderers. The film shows in an oppressive way how people lose all human, moral and ethic rules under terrible circumstances in a civil war.

Shortly afterwards, Massaker also won the IDÉE SUISSE award of the Swiss Broadcasting Corporation at the internationally renowned documentary film festival Visions du Réel (Visions of Reality) in Nyon. The Marseille Festival of Documentary Film honoured the production with a special mention. Altogether, it was selected for more than 50 festivals.

Still in 2005, Borgmann and Slim co-founded the Umam Documentation & Research (UMAM D&R) centre with a twofold objective: to build a citizen archive accessible to the general public, and to raise awareness within the Lebanese population on the subjects of war and violence through the arts, e.g. exhibitions, publications, film screenings etc. In 2009, for instance, the couple presented the Israeli-animated war documentary drama film Waltz with Bashir about the key role of the Israel Defense Forces in the Sabra and Shatila Massacre to an audience of about 90 people. Since trade with Israel is forbidden by Lebanese law, the event was dubbed as private, but still sparked a national controversy.

In 2012, one year after the beginning of the popular uprising in Syria, Borgmann and Slim supported a project by seven Lebanese men, who had been detained in Syrian prisons for periods between eight and fifteen years. The result was a stage play with the title The German Chair, named after a tool for torture which was once introduced by German henchmen. The former prisoners performed the drama in five German cities.

Following up on this project, Borgmann and Slim directed the documentary film Tadmor, in which 22 former detainees from Lebanon reenacted their daily life of suffering from brutal torture in the notorious Tadmor Prison in the Syrian city of Palmyra. The premiere took place in April 2016 at the Visions du Réel in Nyon. It won two awards at that festival and was also honoured with the Political Film Award of the Friedrich Ebert Foundation at the Filmfest Hamburg.

On February 3, 2021, Slim – a prominent critic of Hezbollah as well as of all other sectarian parties – was found assassinated in his car following a visit to a friend in Hezbollah-dominated Southern Lebanon. Having received death threats before, he was shot several times in the head and the back. Borgmann has been stressing to international media her demand for an international investigation ever since, as she could not trust the Lebanese authorities. She has continued the work of her slain husband emphasizing:

The fight against the culture of impunity has always been at the centre of our work [..] Now we need to do it without him, but for him.

For this purpose, Borgmann cofounded the Lokman Slim Foundation on the first anniversary of his killing. She also runs the MENA Prison Forum, which does research and calls for attention to inhumane detention conditions in the wider region. At the end of 2021, Borgmann was awarded the Franco-German Prize for Human Rights by the Ministry for Europe and Foreign Affairs of France and Germany's Federal Foreign Office.

== Filmography ==
- 2005: Massaker, feature film (director & script), with Lokman Slim and Hermann Theißen
- 2009: Sur place – 4 Revenants des guerres libanaises, feature film (director & script), with Lokman Slim
- 2016: Tadmor, feature film (director & script), with Lokman Slim

== Selected writings ==
- Saïd Mekbel, une mort à la lettre, published by Dar Al-Jadeed, Beirut 2008 and Téraèdre Éditions, Paris 2013 (French)
- عن ستوديو بعابك ومنازل لبنانية اخرى, with Lokman Slim, published by Umam Documentation & Research, Beirut 2013 (Arabic)
