= Lokman Slim =

Lebanese publisher and political activist (1962–2021)

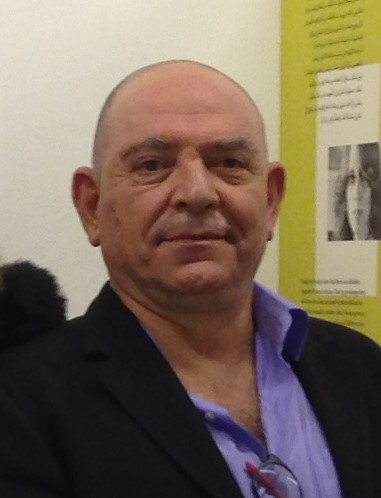
- Lokman Slim in 2018
- Born: 17 July 1962; Haret Hreik, Lebanon
- Died: 3 February 2021 (aged 58); Sidon District, Lebanon
- Cause of death: Murder (gunshot wounds)
- Education: Master, Sorbonne
- Title: Director Hayya Bina
- Website: http://www.hayyabina.org; http://www.umam-dr.org

Lokman Mohsen Slim (Arabic: لقمان محسن سليم; 17 July 1962 – 4 February 2021) was a Lebanese Shiite publisher, political activist, and commentator. As a contributor to the development of civil-society initiatives, several of which he founded, he promoted a Culture of Remembrance to cope with the many past and present conflicts of Lebanon and the whole region. Slim was known to be a prominent critic of Hezbollah (as well as all other sectarian parties).

He was found shot to death in his car in Hezbollah-dominated southern Lebanon in 2021. Many people, including Slim's sister have alleged Hezbollah to have committed the assassination, a charge that Hezbollah has denied.

== Early life and career ==
Lokman Mohsen Slim was born in Haret Hreik, what was then a village near and is now Southern Beirut. He was the scion of an influential Lebanese-Shia family with strong ties to the Christian elites. His mother Salma Merchak, who survived him, was an Egyptian born novelist of Lebanese Christian roots. His father Mohsen Slim was a deputy (MP) in the Lebanese parliament from 1960 to 1964 and in 1977 founded the Shia-dominated party of the Union des Forces Libanaises, which demanded the disarmament of the militant Palestinian forces in Lebanon. Later in the course of the Lebanese Civil War he moved his law practice to Paris.

Lokman Slim moved to France in 1982 to study philosophy at the Paris-Sorbonne University. He returned to Beirut in 1988. Two years later, he founded Dar al Jadeed Publishing House, which publishes Arabic literature and essays of controversial content. Its publications range from books banned by the Lebanese General Security to the first Arabic translations of the writings of Muhammad Khatami, the former Iranian reformist president, which generated controversy within the Shia community in Lebanon.

Several of Slim's articles, essays, and translations have been published in English, French, and Arabic newspapers and books.

He lived and worked in the Southern Suburbs of Beirut, Greater Beirut, South Lebanon, and the Bekaa Valley.

== Art as political activism ==
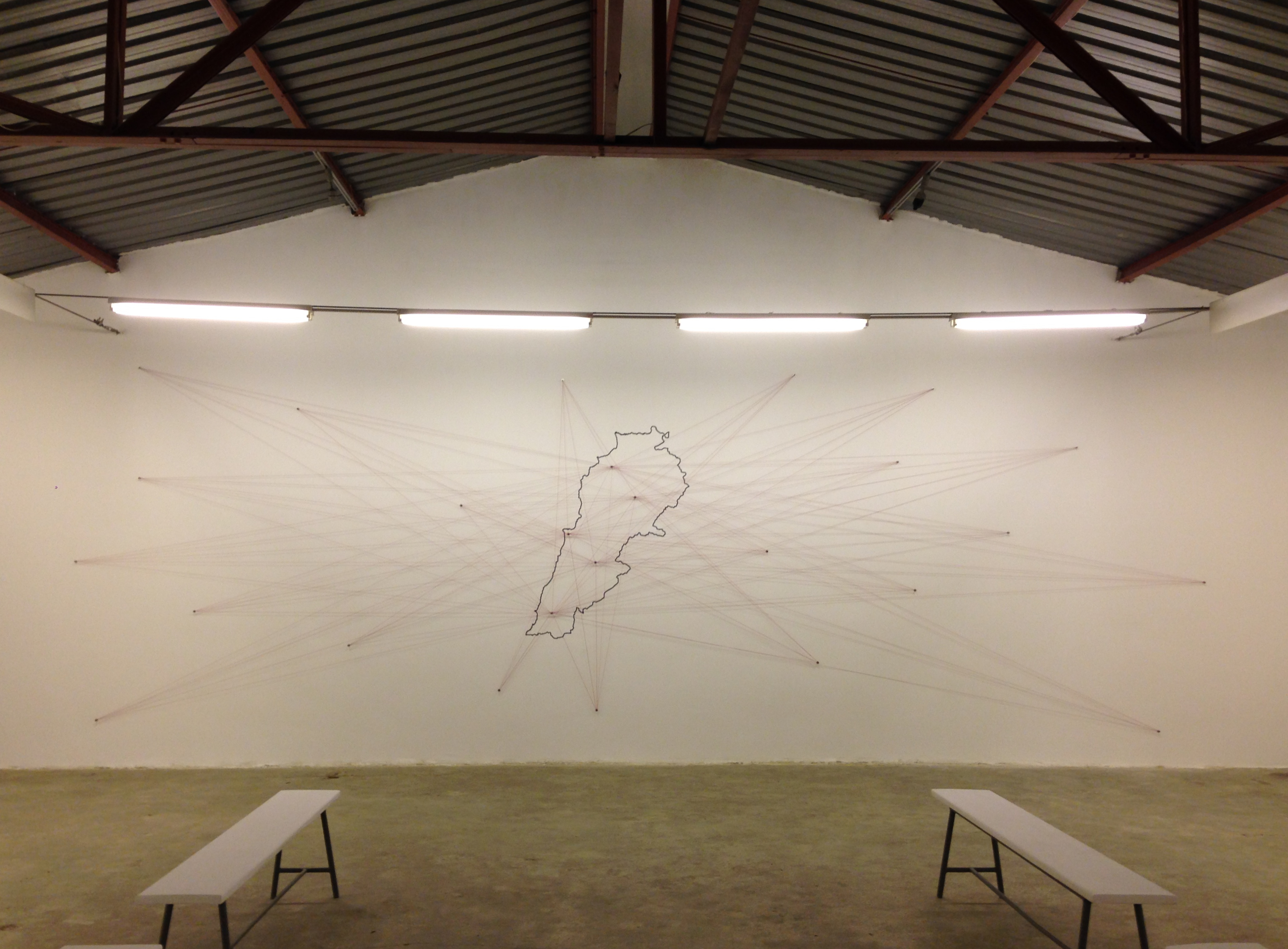
The UMAM-Hangar during the 2018 exhibition "In Praise of Lebanese Fusion"

In 2001, Slim moved into film with the establishment of Umam Productions, which has produced several films, including Massaker co-directed by Slim and his German wife Monika Borgmann. It won the Fipresci Award at the Berlin International Film Festival in 2005.

In 2004, he co-founded Umam Documentation & Research (D&R), a non-profit organization based in the southern Beirut suburb of Haret Hreik, where the organization is creating an open archive of materials concerning Lebanon's social and political history. The organization organizes and facilitates exhibits at its famous “Hangar” for artists to openly address the scars of the Lebanese Civil War (1975–1990), which is considered taboo and taught neither at the elementary or high school levels. Umam also organizes film screenings, art exhibitions, and discussions relating to civil violence and war memory.

One of Umam's ongoing exhibits since 2008 is “Missing,” a collage of photographs depicting persons missing from the Lebanese Civil War. The exhibition is presented in conjunction with the "Committee of the Relatives of the Kidnapped and Missing in Lebanon," "Support of the Lebanese in Detention and Exile (SOLIDE)," and the "Committee of the Families of Lebanese Detainees in Syria," along with hundreds of individuals related to the missing.

== Civic education as driver for political change ==
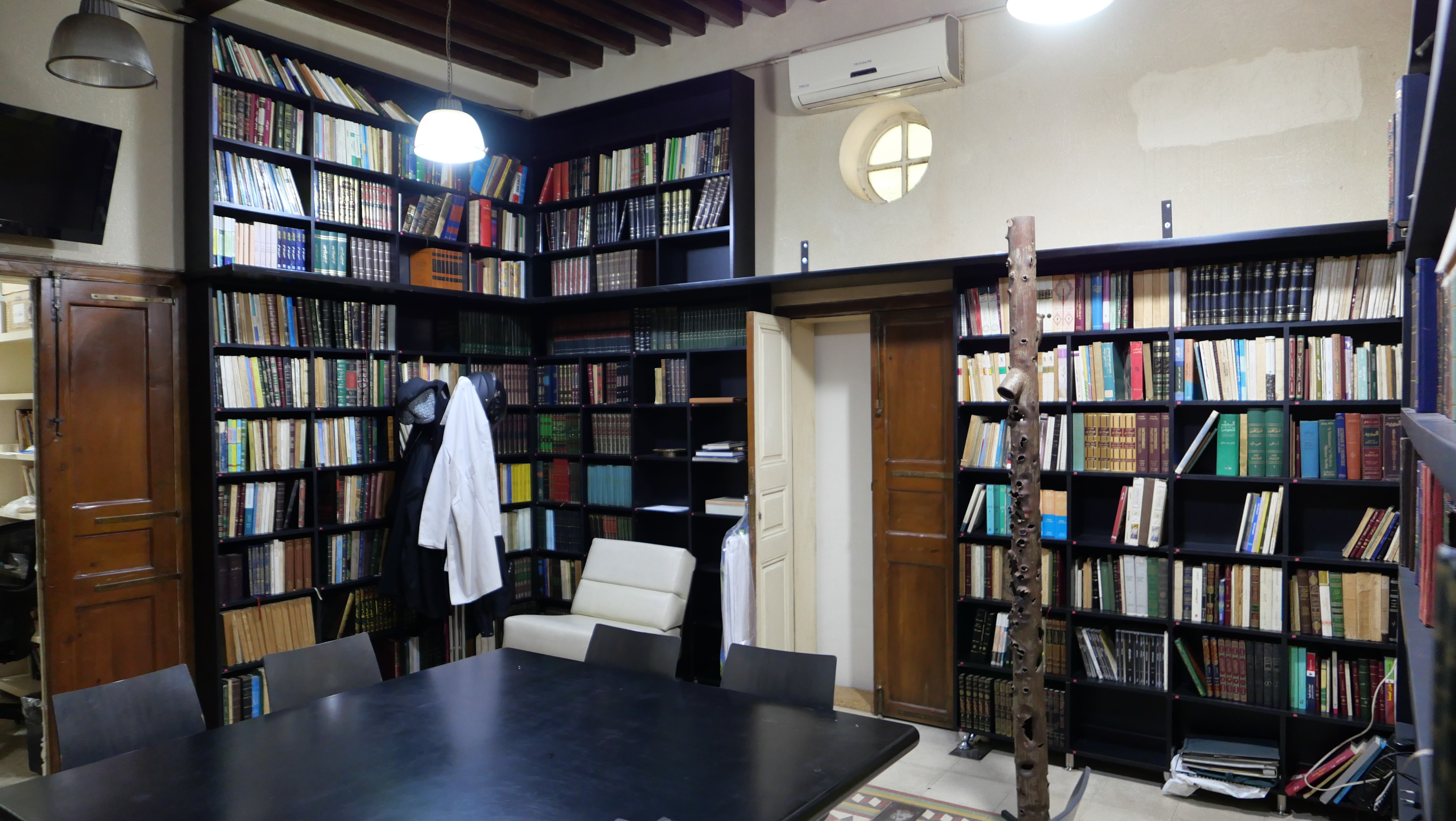
Slim's office at UMAM with his jackets still on the wardrobe as he left them before his assassination. To the right is a bullet-riddled lamppost that used to stand at the green line during Lebanon's Civil War.

Slim's project Hayya Bina (HB) (an Arabic phrase meaning "Let’s Go") is an initiative which began during the 2005 parliamentary elections in Lebanon with the aim of promoting citizen involvement in the political process and opposing Lebanon's sectarian system. Slim himself compared the religiously-based sectarian communities to “cells in which the Lebanese are jailed." Hayya Bina implements projects nationwide, working particularly in the Shiite communities of South Lebanon, the “Dahieh” of Beirut, Mount Lebanon, and the Bekaa Valley regions.

In 2008, Hayya Bina participated as a partner with the National Democratic Institute's (NDI) “Citizen Lebanon” project. In conjunction with leadership and civic participation trainings conducted by NDI, Hayya Bina spearheaded a number of public advocacy projects in Shiite areas of Lebanon. In Baalbek, Hayya Bina's field staff organized a pesticide project in order to help boost the economy of local farmers; in Shmustar, staff coordinated with residents to publicly advocate for garbage collection services to prevent communicable diseases from spreading; in Hermel, a region-wide project to clean up the Assi River. This project included environmental awareness activities, cleanup days, and formal discussions with elected officials.

Hayya Bina continues to implement Lebanon's only nationwide English education program for adult women, “Teach Women English,” recruiting teachers in rural areas in order to bring classes to economically depressed areas in the south and Bekaa Valley. The program's pedagogy combines formal grammar with substantive nodes, such as human rights, civics, workplace, and around-the-home vocabulary. The program's cross-regional emphasis has also enabled rural teachers who have never left their villages to travel across the country for teacher training programs.

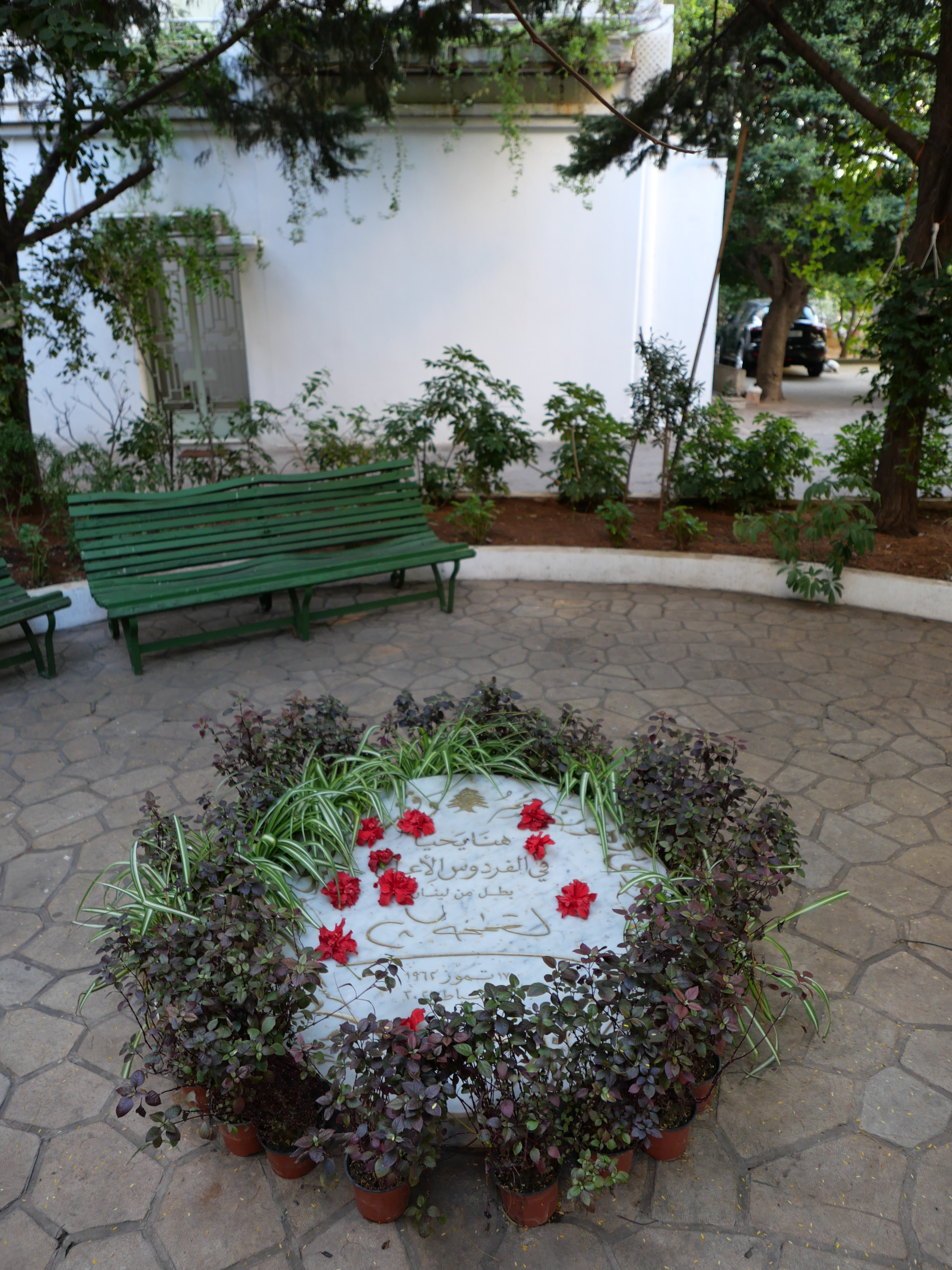
The grave of Slim at UMAM

== Political views and threats ==
Slim stated in 2019 that Hezbollah's leader was responsible for alleged incidents where people came to his home and offices to chant slurs and threats. He also reported death threats after a debate during the 2019–2020 Lebanese protests. Slim has stated a belief that Hezbollah had a role in the 2020 Beirut explosion.

== Death ==
On the night of 3 February 2021, during the COVID-19 pandemic lockdown, Lokman was returning alone in his rented car to Beirut, after visiting a friend in the village of Niha, Tyre District, and was not traceable in the next hours. Later his car was discovered in a remote area between the villages of Addousiyeh and Tafahta in southern al Zahrani district, Sidon District, and Lokman was found dead inside it, after being shot four times in the head and once in the back. He was admitted to a local hospital, where he was declared dead. His sister said that "probably there's an ideological and political background in the assassination".

Slim had, in the days before the killing, stated that Hezbollah supporters had been threatening him at his home and accusing him of treason. After the death was confirmed, Jawad Nasrallah, the son of Hezbollah's leader, tweeted: "The loss of some people is in fact an unplanned gain #notsorry". He later deleted the message and denied that he had been referring to Slim. It was part of an attack and hate campaign on social media targeting Slim. Hezbollah condemned the killing, denied any involvement and called for an immediate investigation. According to sources Hezbollah's Unit 121 was responsible for the assassination. DW judged that Slim was "one in a long list of killings" befalling Hezbollah's critics, and that "no one in Lebanon expects any resolution to Slim's murder".

=== Investigation ===
The investigation into Slim's death was completed by the Internal Security Forces. In May 2021, the public prosecutor for southern Lebanon closed in the investigation with no arrests and charges having been made. Following complaints by Slim's family, the case was referred to an investigative judge.

In 2022, Human Rights Watch raised concerns about the "flawed" investigation, citing evidence including the ISF's failure to secure the crime scene, potentially leading to the contamination of evidence. Slim's family criticised that the investigation was initially led by local officers in Srifa and Zefta, prompting the ISF to transfer the investigation to its Information Branch. They also commented that the investigation appeared focused on Slim's death being as a result of a personal dispute or suicide. The investigations of the murder as well as the Beirut Port explosion lead to Unit 121 assassination squad that was headed at the time by Salim Ayyash.

In November 2023, the judge overseeing the investigation, Charbel Ali Samra, retired. Slim's family reported that Samra only interviewed three witnesses during his two years of involvement. The following month, Bilal Halawi took over as the investigating judge.

In February 2024, Human Rights Watch renewed its appeal for prosecutorial and investigative authorities in Lebanon to ensure justice for Slim.

== Calls for investigation renewal ==
As the fourth anniversary of Slim's death approached, calls to renew the investigation into his murder grew. However, the president and prime minister-designate remained firm in rejecting these demands. Later, MP Ashraf Rifi was quoted by MTV Lebanon: "closing the investigation file into the assassination of the martyr of the word, Lokman Slim, constitutes a black stain on the history of the judiciary and an underestimation of the values represented by the great martyr. We also consider it a blatant transgression,".

== Personal life ==
Lokman Slim was married to Monika Borgmann.

== See also ==
- List of extrajudicial killings and political violence in Lebanon
