= Lebanese detainees in Syria =

The Lebanese prisoners detained in Syria or the Missing Lebanese in Syria are hundreds or even thousands (estimated at 622) of Lebanese citizens who were detained or disappeared during the Lebanese Civil War (1975–1990) and after, in the time of the Syrian occupation of Lebanon, which lasted until 2005. These detentions included individuals from various political parties, activists, and journalists. Even after the war, the plight of detainees in Syrian prisons has persisted as a topic of discussion and contention in Lebanon, with families demanding to know their fate and calling for their release. Despite years of denial by the Syrian regime of the presence of Lebanese detainees in its prisons, many were released on various occasions.

On December 5, 2024, Hay’at Tahrir al-Sham announced the release of approximately 100 Lebanese prisoners from the Hama prison following clashes in Aleppo, giving renewed hope to families of detainees.

== Historical context ==
During the Lebanese Civil War, Syrian forces entered Lebanon as part of the Arab Deterrent Forces and intervened in Lebanese affairs. Many individuals were arrested and transported to Syrian prisons under various accusations, such as collaboration with Israel, opposition to the Syrian regime, or affiliation with specific political parties. Following the war, arrests continued, particularly targeting political dissidents. Many of these detainees were sent to notorious Syrian prisons like Tadmor, Sednaya, Mezzeh, Damascus, Aleppo, Adra, Hama, Suwayda, Homs, and Far' Falastin.

- 1998: Syria released 121 Lebanese detainees.
- 2000: Syria released 54 Lebanese detainees, claiming they were the last remaining political prisoners.
- 2009: A political association called the "Association of Lebanese Political Prisoners in Syrian Prisons" led by Ali Abou Dehn, was founded in Beirut to assist detainees.
- December 5, 2024: Hay’at Tahrir al-Sham announced the release of approximately 100 Lebanese prisoners from Hama prison following clashes in Aleppo, giving renewed hope to families of detainees who believed their loved ones might still be alive.

== Number of detainees ==
Determining the exact number of Lebanese detainees in Syrian prisons is challenging, with estimates varying widely. However, families, associations, and human rights organizations estimate that 622 individuals were forcibly disappeared. The Syrian authorities deny the presence of any Lebanese detainees in their prisons, but these claims are met with skepticism by families and rights groups.

=== List ===
Name	Date of disappearance	Location	Description	Reference
Boutros Khawand	1992			
Jack Abi Mrad	13 February 1985			
Jihad George Eid	13 October 1990			
Johnny Salem Nassif	13 October 1990			

== Efforts to address the issue ==
=== Local efforts ===
- Organizations like SOLIDE were established under Ghazi Aad's leadership to represent families and demand accountability for their missing relatives.
- Protests and demonstrations are regularly held in front of embassies and Lebanese governmental institutions.

=== Government efforts ===
- The issue has been raised sporadically in Lebanese-Syrian negotiations, but no definitive results have been achieved.
- A lack of strong governmental pressure has allowed delays in resolving the matter.

=== International efforts ===
- Organizations like Amnesty International and Human Rights Watch have highlighted the issue and called on both Lebanese and Syrian governments to investigate enforced disappearances.

== Challenges ==
- Political tensions between Lebanon and Syria.
- A lack of documented evidence due to the secretive nature of these detentions.
- Regional and international neglect of the issue.

== NGOs ==
- Support of the Lebanese in Detention and Exile (SOLIDE) - (دعم المعتقلين والمنفيين اللبنانيين (سوليد, under the leadership of the late Ghazi Aad
- Committee of the Families of Kidnapped and Disappeared in Lebanon (CFKDL): founded in 1982
- Act for the Disappeared (ACT) is a Lebanese human rights organization, created in 2010 to help with the fate of the disappeared and missing in Lebanon

== See also ==
- List of Lebanese in Syrian jails
- Boutros Khawand: A member of the Lebanese Kataeb Party who was kidnapped in Beirut in 1992 and whose fate remains unknown to this day.
- War of Liberation

== Bibliography ==
- Back from Hell by Ali Abou Dehn, recounting his experience in Syrian prisons.
