= Tyre Necropolis =

Lebanese UNESCO World Heritage site

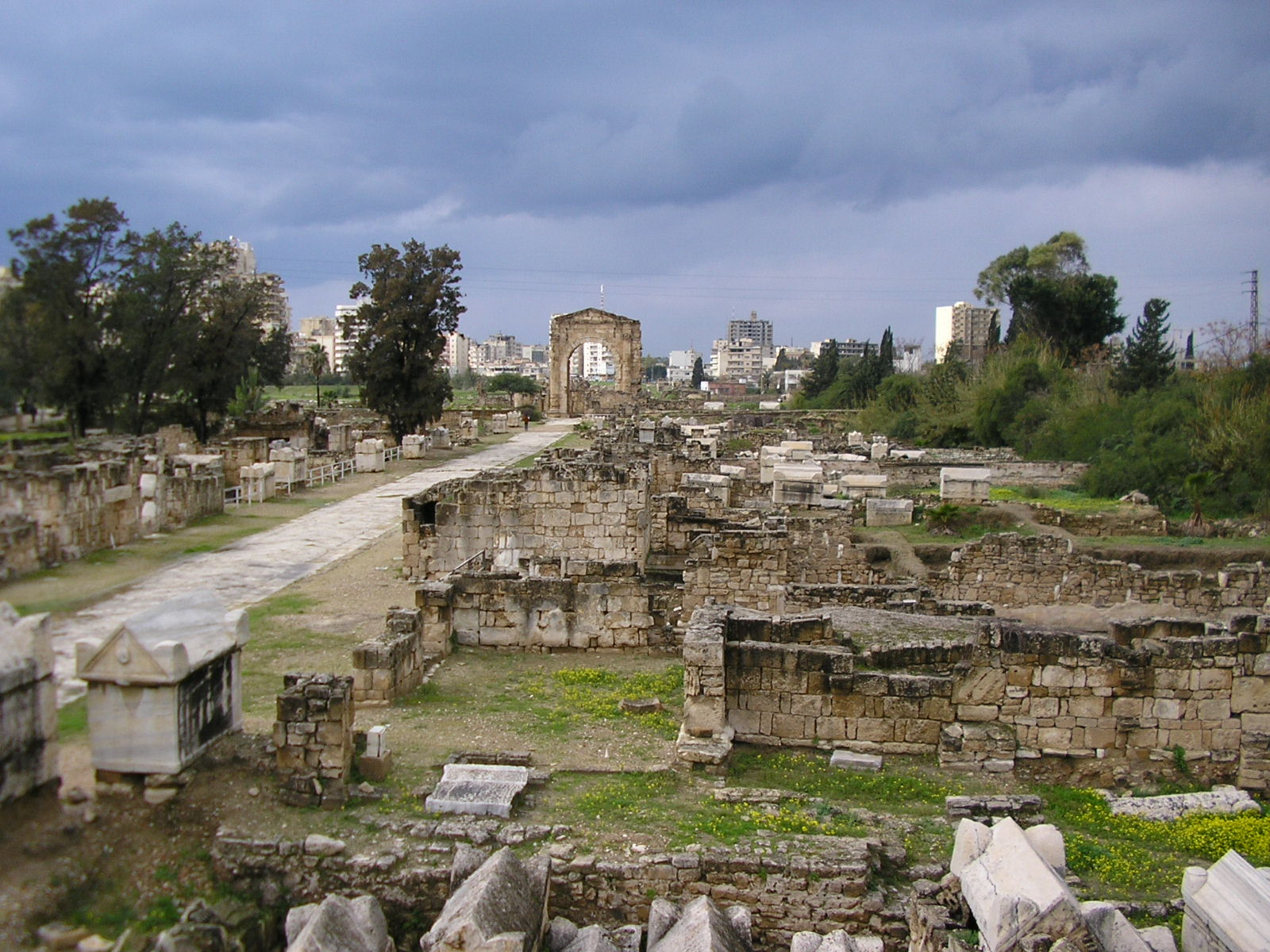
- The al-Bass archaeological site

- Location within Lebanon
- 33°16′20″N 35°12′35″E
- Location: Tyre, Lebanon

Site notes
- Excavation dates: 1997–2008

The al-Bass necropolis is a Lebanese UNESCO World Heritage Site, part of the al-Bass archaeological site in the city of Tyre situated next to the el-Buss refugee camp. The necropolis, constituting the principal entrance of the town in antique times, is to be found on either side of a wide Roman and Byzantine avenue dominated by a triumphal arch of the 2nd century. Other important monumental vestiges of this archaeological area are an aqueduct, which carried water to the city, and a 2nd-century hippodrome.

== History ==
=== Phoenician period ===
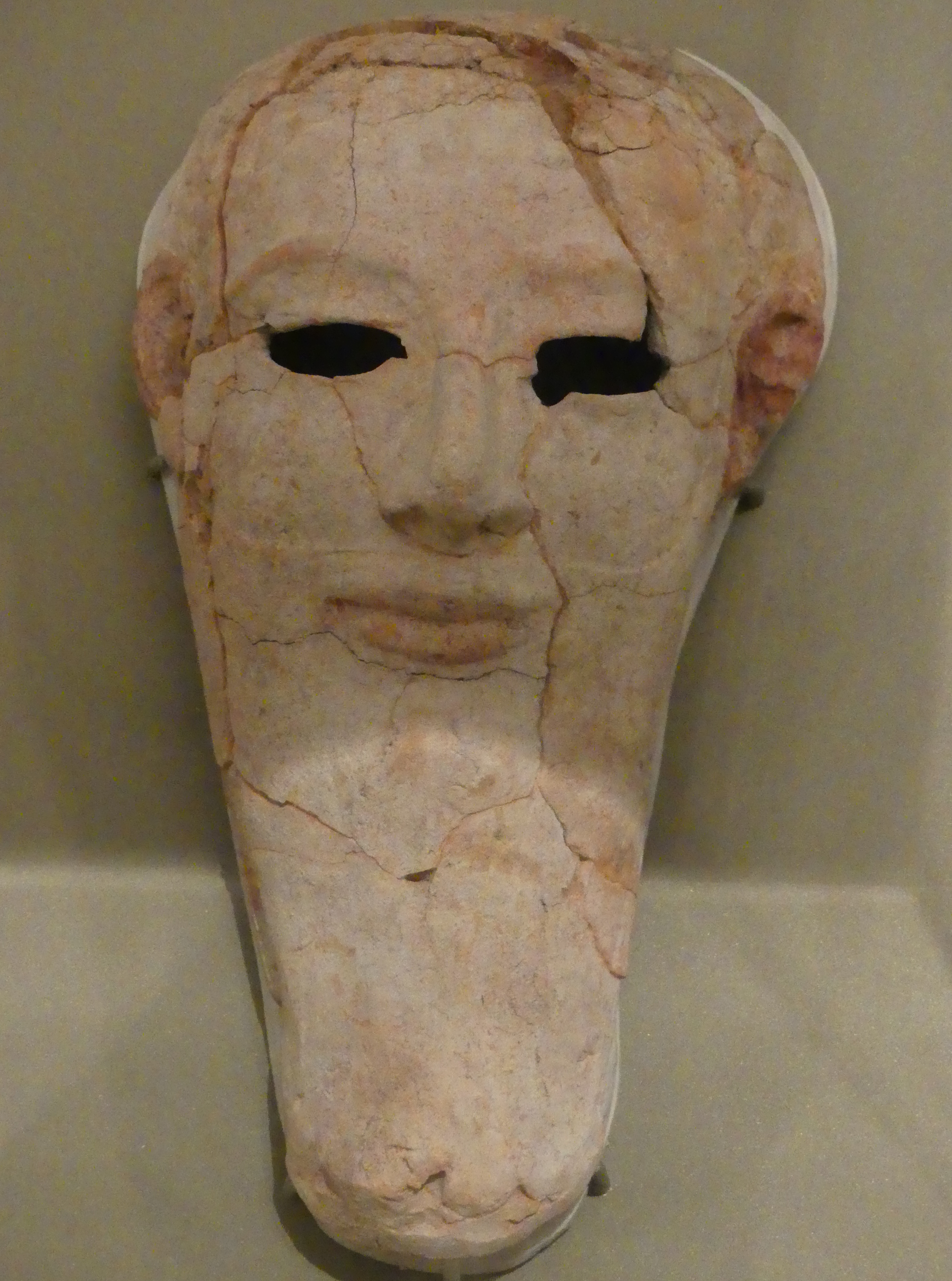
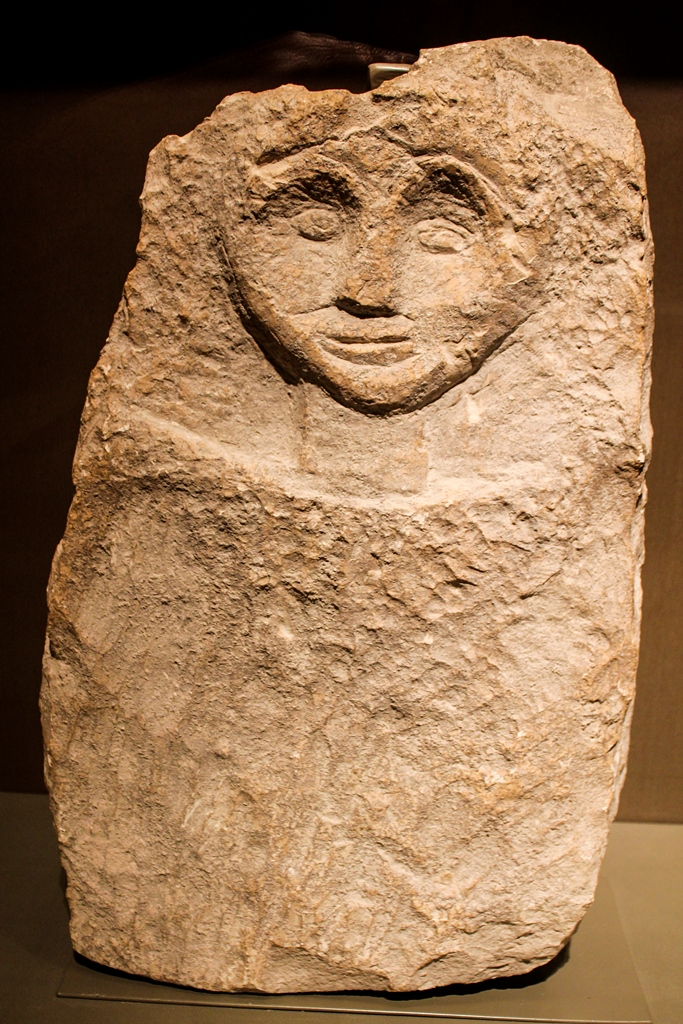
Phoenician terracotta funerary mask (7th c. BCE) and stela from El-Buss at the National Museum of Beirut

The al-Buss site dates back at least three thousand years. A Phoenician cremation cemetery from the Iron Age was uncovered in an area of some 500 square meters in the southeastern corner of the Palestinian refugee camp, the first discovery of its kind and with about 320 excavated urns the most densely occupied Phoenician cemetery known in the Levant. El Buss was the principal graveyard for the maritime merchant-republic city-state of Tyre in its most expansive and prosperous era for almost four hundred years. It thus offers unique windows into the Phoenician past:

The cemetery was established at the end of the tenth century BCE on what was then a sea-beach at the edge of the coast opposite of what was then the island city of Tyre. The beach originally also bordered the southern edge of an ancient creek delta. The landscape shifted though over the centuries and millennia. Hence, the creek bay turned into a lagoon, separated from the sea by a sand bar:

"Paleobotanical and faunal analyses of the sand sediment in the area show that the creek became a lake during the ninth and eighth centuries B.C.E."

The most common type of burial in this necropolis was made up of twin-urns with the remains of the same individual - one containing the ashes and the other the bones mixed personal possessions, as well as two jugs and a bowl for drinking. About a fifth of the discovered urns with bone remains contained a scarab-amulet. The researchers, led by Professor María Eugenia Aubet from the Pompeu Fabra University in Barcelona, also excavated a few stelae which bore inscriptions and human masks sculpted from terracotta. Some of them are considered to be masterpieces and on display at the National Museum of Beirut. Altogether, one has to imagine a beach with such personalised gravestones sticking out of the sand, with a view on the fortified island city. Aubet concludes:

"The structure of the cemetery at Tyre is in some ways reminiscent of the European urnfields, in which apparently little formal differentiation according to the sex, age, and content of the burials can be seen, although their structure in fact conceals genuine social asymmetries. [..] Rather than an 'egalitarian' society for Tyre, we should probably speak of an egalitarian ideology, appropriate to a wholly urban and sophisticated society, characterized by the relative simplicity and lack of ostentation of its funeral customs. A communal ideology that concealed differences of wealth and power is evident. [..] with only limited evidence of social stratification, such a conclusion should be regarded as tentative and subject to refinement on the basis of further and future excavations at Tyre."

=== Hellenistic period ===
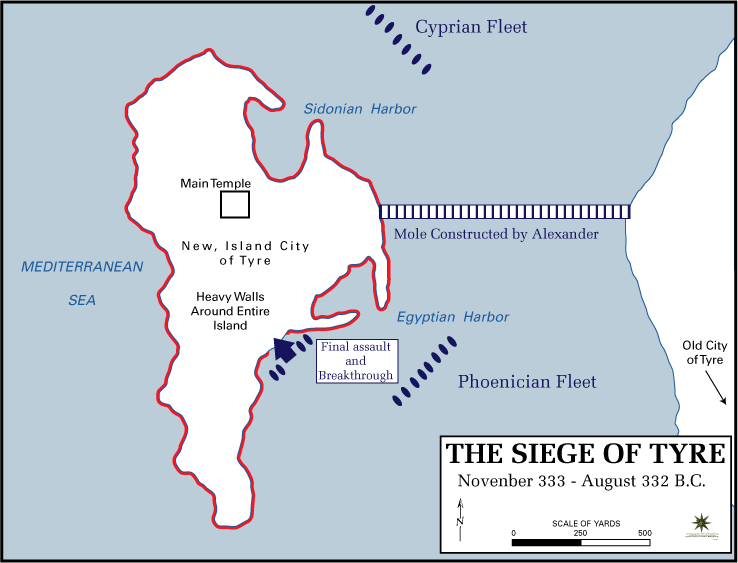
Illustration of Alexander's siege by the United States Military Academy

In 332 BCE, Alexander the Great had an isthmus of about 1.000 meters length constructed in 332 BCE to breach the fortifications of offshore-Tyre. This causeway increased greatly in width because of extensive silt depositions on either side over the centuries. The growing tombolo linked the original island permanently to the adjacent continent and made the city a peninsula. As a consequence of this man-made metamorphosis of the Tyrian coastal system, the Phoenician graves in El Buss were buried under sediments of clay and sand. After almost two and a half millennia, they are now at more than 3.5 m under the ground level of El Buss.

Before the landscape changed though, the Phoenician funerary site of El Buss was still used during the Hellenistic era. In addition, the area just neighbouring to the North, now known as Jal Al Bahr, became a burial ground, as recent excavations have shown. To the South of it, a sanctuary dedicated to the Olympian deity of Apollo was constructed, possibly still at the end of the Hellenistic era or latest in the first century CE:

=== Roman period ===
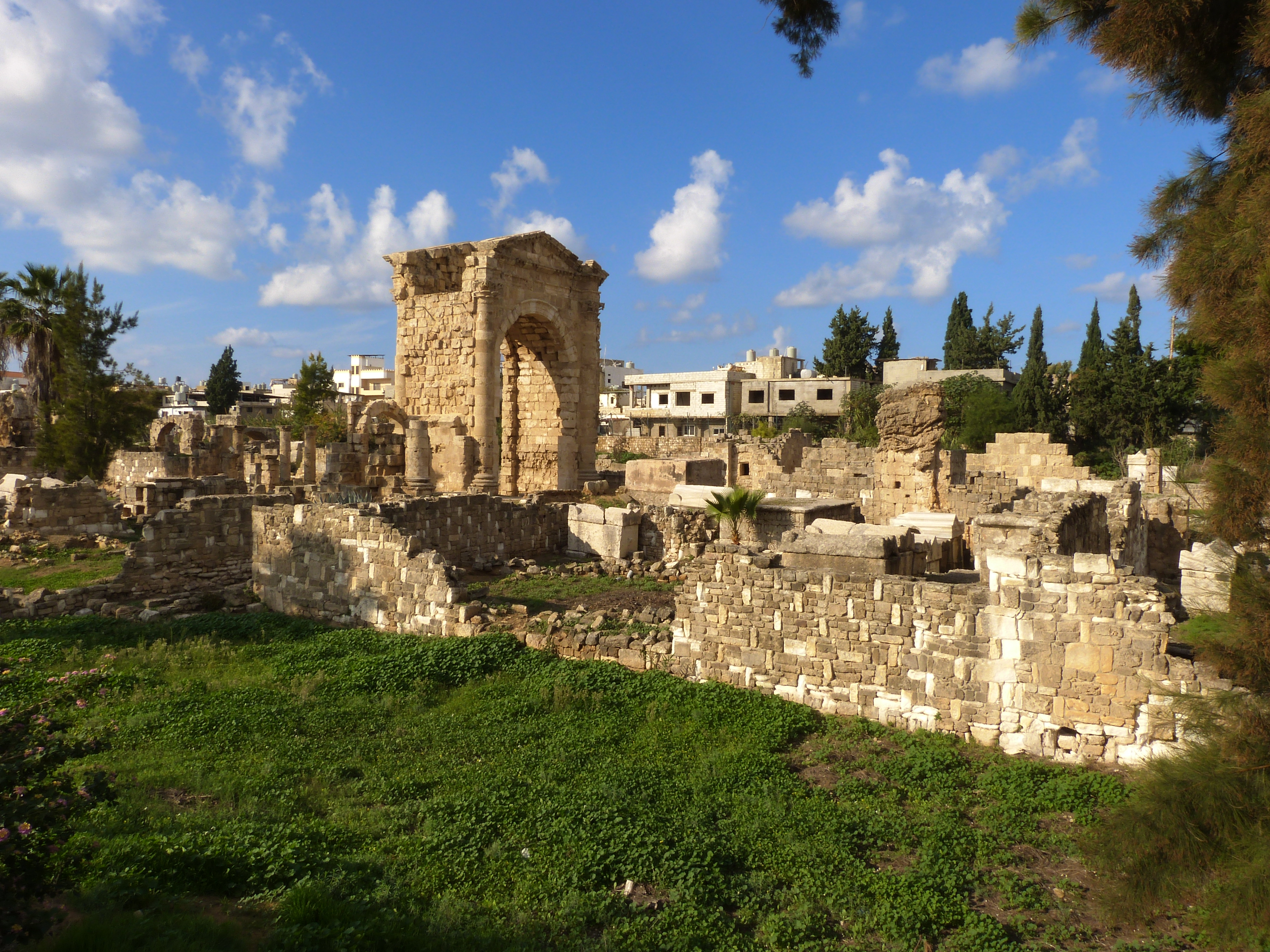
The reconstructed Triumphal Arch with the refugee camp in the back

In 64 BCE the area of "Syria" finally became a province of the late Roman Republic, which was itself about to become the Roman Empire. Tyre was allowed to keep much of its independence as a "civitas foederata".

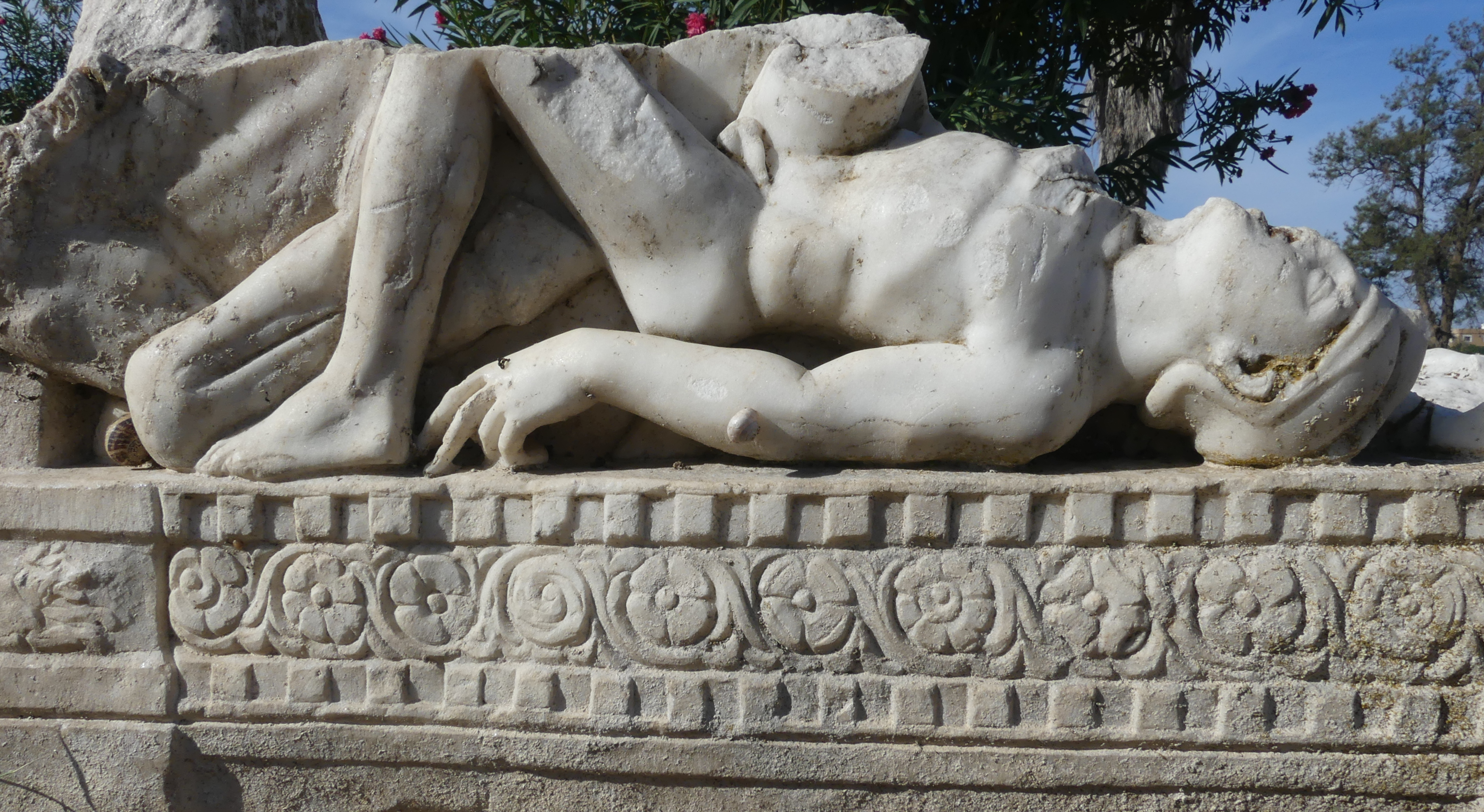
Broken relief in el Buss

Various sources in the New Testament state that Jesus visited Tyre (Gospel of Luke 6:17; Mark 3:8 and 7:24; Matthew 11:21–23 and 15:21). According to many believers in later centuries, he sat down on a rock in the Southern part of El Buss and had a meal there. Scientific analyses from archaeological excavations indicate that an olive grove planted was inside the Roman necropolis at the beginning of the Christian era.

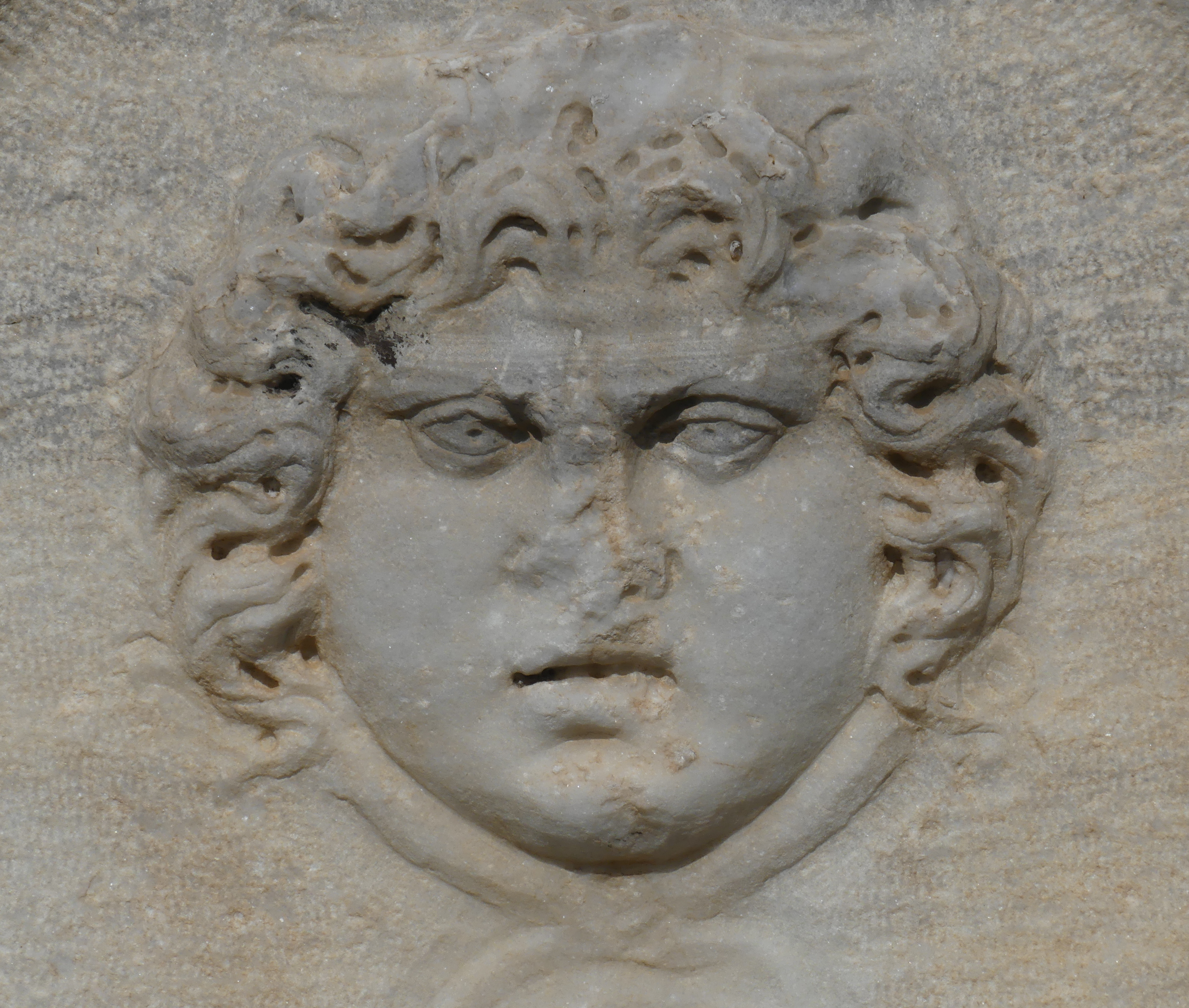
Face relief on a sarcophagus

In the early second century CE, Emperor Hadrian, who visited the cities of the East around 130 CE, conferred the title of Metropolis on Tyre: "great city" mother of other cities. Subsequently, a triple-bay Triumphal Arch, an aqueduct from the springs of Ras al-Ain some six kilometers to the South and the Tyre Hippodrome were constructed. The arch was 21 meters high and became the gateway of the Roman town. At its side pillars were erected that were more than four meters high and carried the water canal alongside the road into the town on the peninsula. The hippodrome is the largest (480m long and 160m wide) and best-preserved Roman hippodrome after the one in Rome. The amphitheater for the horse-racetrack could host some 30.000 spectators. During the third century CE, the Heraclia games – dedicated to the deity Melqart-Heracles (not to be confused with the demigod Heracles, hero of the 12 labors) – were held in the hippodrome every four years.

Meanwhile, between the first and fourth centuries CE, one of the largest known cemeteries of the region grew in El Buss with more than forty tomb complexes, at least 825 graves and the physical remains of almost 4,000 individuals. The marble sarcophagi, which were imported from Greece and Asia Minor, and the other tombs of the monumental necropolis spread on both sides of the road leading to the triumphal arch over a kilometer in length. It is unclear how far the burial grounds extended, but researchers argue that large parts of the modern camp could well have been part of the necropolis. Whereas the Phoenician funeral practices of an egalitarian ideology concealed social differences, the Roman graves did the opposite:

"The tombs of Tyre [..] demonstrate that the coming of Rome was not just a new economic and military reality but also caused social and cultural changes, which were acted out in part in the cemetery. [..] Through the display of socioeconomic position and civic and group identity, the tombs played an important and new role in the definition of social groups, and perhaps in the renegotiation of the boundaries of these groups.

=== Byzantine period (395–640) ===
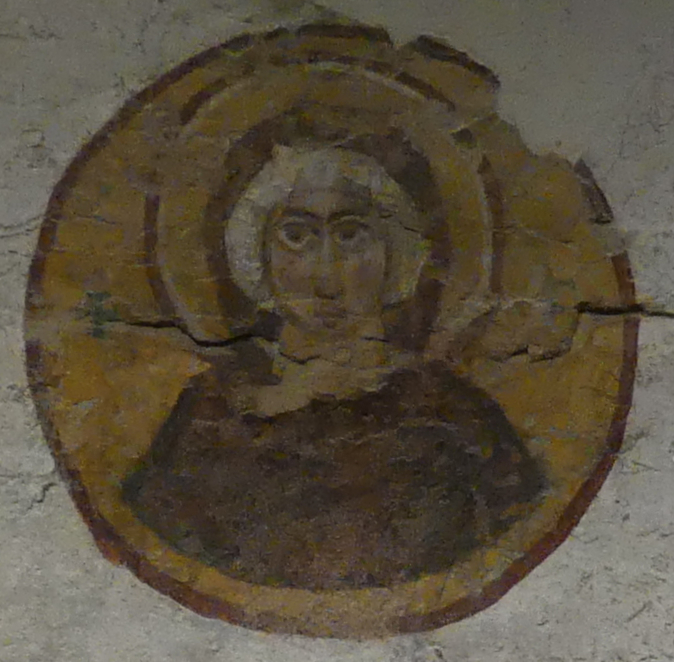
Fresco image of Mary at the National Museum of Beirut

In 395 Tyre became part of the Byzantine Empire and continued to flourish. Likewise, the necropolis in El Bus grew further to be arguably one of the largest in the world, though many graves were "reused". A main road of some 400m length and 4,5m width paved with limestone was constructed there during Byzantine times. Another arch, smaller than the Roman triumphal arch, was erected some 315 meters to the East.

At the entrance to the oldest monument in the El Buss site - the Apollo Shrine from the 1st century BCE - a fresco was found that has been dated to 440 CE and is "possibly the earliest image of the Virgin Mary" worldwide. Close by, two churches with marble decorations were built in the 5th and early 6th century CE respectively, when construction in ancient Tyre reached its zenith.

Over the course of the 6th century CE, starting in 502, a series of earthquakes shattered the city and left it diminished. The worst one was the 551 Beirut earthquake. It was accompanied by a Tsunami and destroyed the Great Triumphal Arch in El Buss. In addition, the city and its population increasingly suffered during the 6th century from the political chaos that ensued when the Byzantine empire was torn apart by wars. The city remained under Byzantine control until it was captured by the Sassanian shah Khosrow II at the turn from the 6th to the 7th century CE, and then briefly regained until the Muslim conquest of the Levant, when in 640 it was taken by the Arab forces of the Rashidun Caliphate.

=== Early Muslim period (640–1124) ===
As the bearers of Islam restored peace and order, Tyre soon prospered again and continued to do so during half a millennium of Caliphate rule. The Rashidun period only lasted until 661. It was followed by the Umayyad Caliphate (until 750) and the Abbasid Caliphate. In the course of the centuries, Islam spread and Arabic became the language of administration instead of Greek.

Although some people reportedly continued to worship ancient cults, the necropolis of El Buss and the other installations there were abandoned still in the 7th century CE and quickly covered by sand dunes.

At the end of the 11th century, Tyre avoided being attacked by paying tribute to the Crusaders who marched on Jerusalem. However, in late 1111, King Baldwin I of Jerusalem laid siege on the former island city and probably occupied the mainland, including El-Buss, for that purpose. Tyre in response put itself under the protection of the nominally Seljuk ruler of Damascus, Toghtekin. Supported by Fatimid forces, he intervened and forced the Franks to raise the siege in April 1112, after about 2.000 of Baldwin's troops had been killed. A decade later, the Fatimids sold Tyre to Toghtekin who installed a garrison there.

=== Crusader period (1124–1291) ===
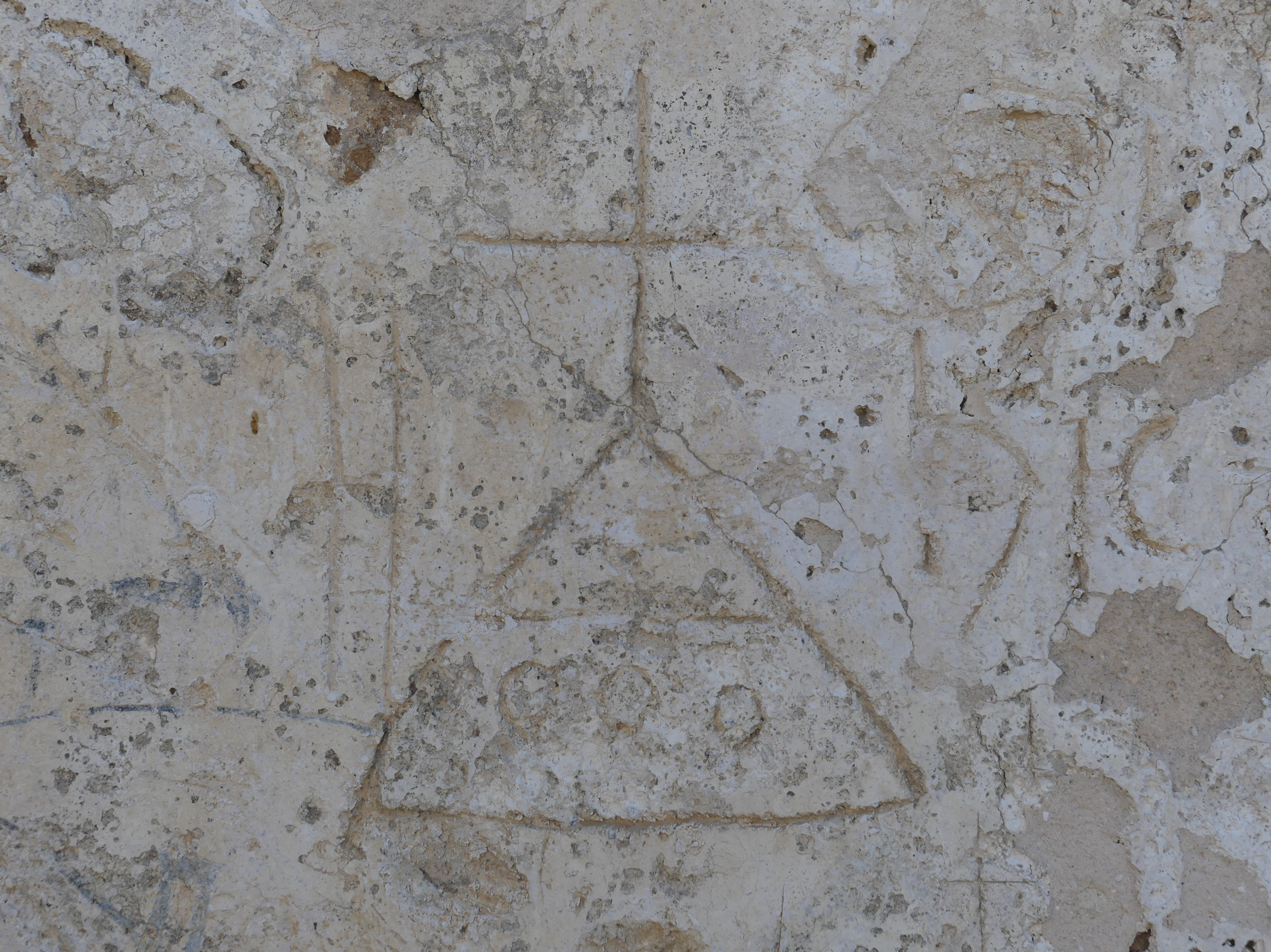
Graffiti in the Church of the Savior or Ecclesiola Hippodromo, hippodrome site (for details see here.)

On 7 July 1124, in the aftermath of the First Crusade, Tyre was the last city to be eventually conquered by the Christian warriors, a Frankish army on the coast - i.e. also in the El Buss area - and a fleet of the Venetian Crusade from the sea side. The takeover followed a siege of five and a half months that caused great suffering from hunger to the population. Eventually, Tyre's Seljuk ruler Toghtekin negotiated an agreement for surrender with the authorities of the Latin Kingdom of Jerusalem. Under its new rulers, Tyre and its countryside - including El-Buss - were divided into three parts in accordance with the Pactum Warmundi: two-thirds to the royal domain of Baldwin and one third as autonomous trading colonies for the Italian merchant cities of Genoa, Pisa and - mainly to the Doge of Venice. He had a particular interest in supplying silica sands to the glassmakers of Venice and so it may be assumed that El Buss fell into his interest sphere. It has to be assumed that at least the Southern part of El Buss was populated, since the Savior Church was built during the crusaders era in a place of the former hippodrome where Jesus supposedly sat down on a rock and had a meal. Hundreds of pilgrims left their signatures on its walls.

=== Mamluk period (1291–1516) ===
In 1291, Tyre was again taken, this time by the Mamluk Sultanate's army of Al-Ashraf Khalil. He had all fortifications demolished to prevent the Franks from re-entrenching. After Khalil's death in 1293 and political instability, Tyre lost its importance and "sank into obsurity." When the Moroccan explorer Ibn Batutah visited Tyre in 1355, he found it a mass of ruins. Many stones were taken to neighbouring cities like Sidon, Acre, Beirut, and Jaffa as building materials. It may be assumed that this was true for the ancient ruins of El Buss, especially the Roman-Byzantine necropolis, aquaeduct and hippodrome as well, as far as they had not been buried underneath sand dunes already. The aquaeduct became the "lone witness to the city’s glorious past."

=== Ottoman period (1516–1918) ===
The Ottoman Empire conquered the Levant in 1516, yet Tyre remained untouched for another ninety years until the beginning of the 17th century, when the Ottoman leadership at the Sublime Porte appointed the Druze leader Fakhreddine II of the Maan family as Emir to administer Jabal Amel (modern-day South Lebanon) and Galilee in addition to the districts of Beirut and Sidon. It is not known whether the area of El Buss was part of his development projects. However, as he encouraged Shiites and Christians to settle to the East of Tyre, Fakhreddine laid the foundation of modern Tyre demographics as many of those settlers – or their descendants respectively – later moved to the town, thus providing the socio-political context for the subsequent erection of El Buss camp.

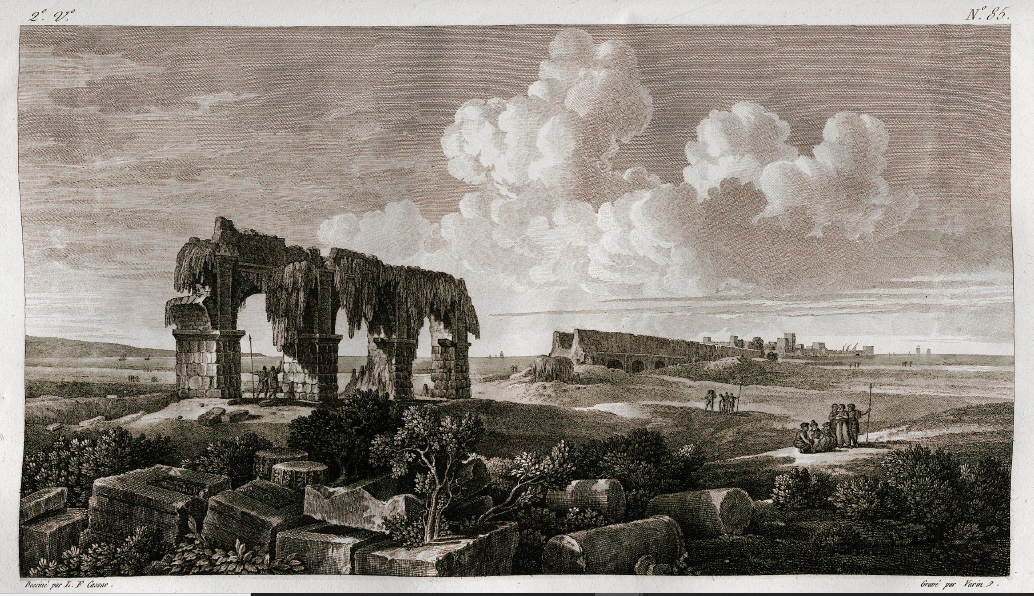
L. F. Cassas, drawing of the aqueduct ruins in El Buss around 1786

In 1764, the French geographer Jacques Nicolas Bellin published a map of Greater Tyre which included the ruins of the aquaeduct in El Buss, but no settlements. Around 1786, Bellin's fellow countryman Louis-François Cassas visited the place and drew a painting of the ruins of the aquaeduct.

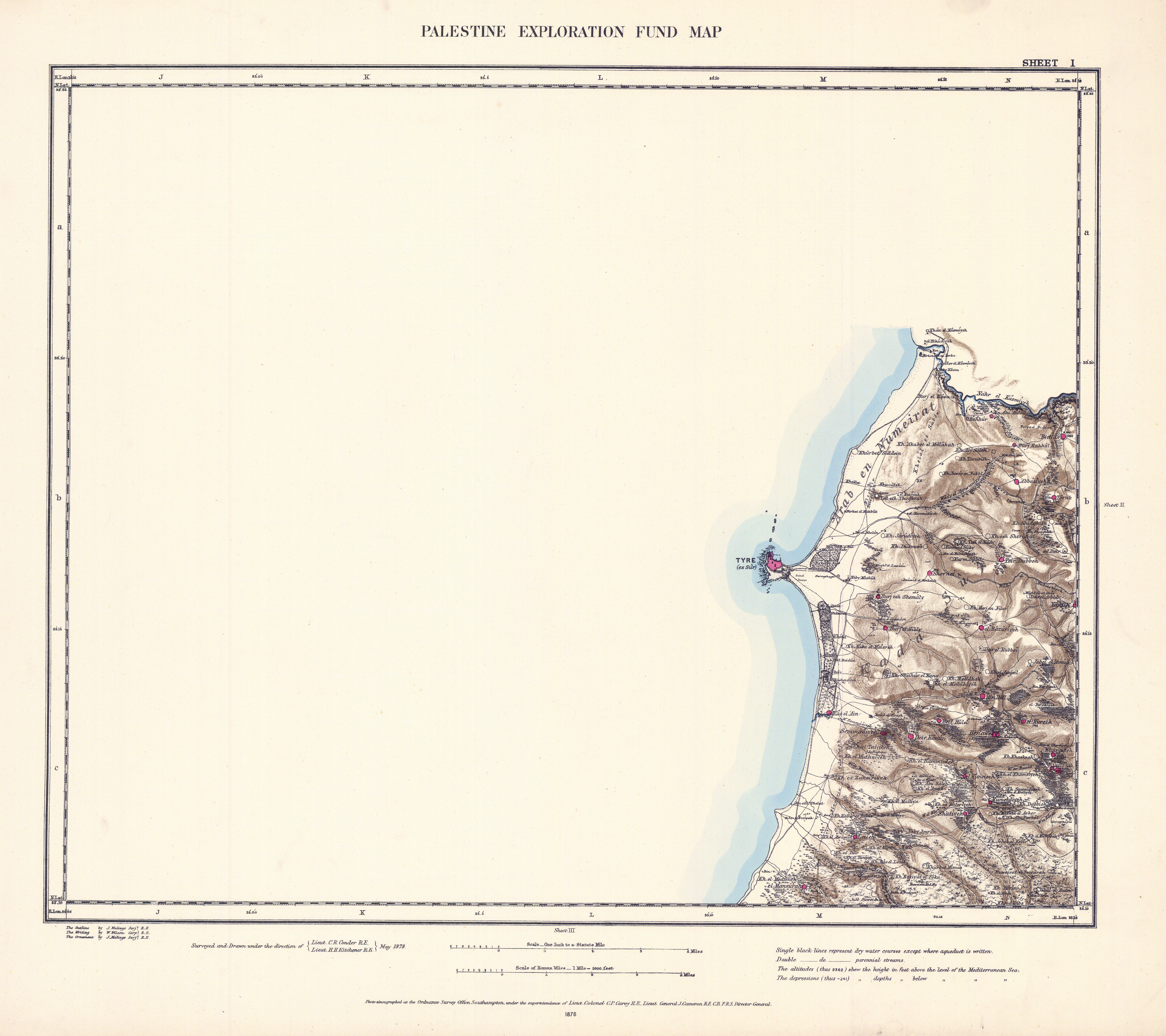
1878 SWP map showing Birket el Bass

In 1878, the London-based Palestine Exploration Fund's Survey of Western Palestine (SWP) – led by Herbert Kitchener at the beginning of his military career – mapped Tyre and its surroundings. It described the area of Birket el Bass – north of the aquaeduct – as a "ruined birket" (water reservoir or pool) and as "dry." A map from a 1906 Baedeker travel guide designated the area as a "Swamp" though.

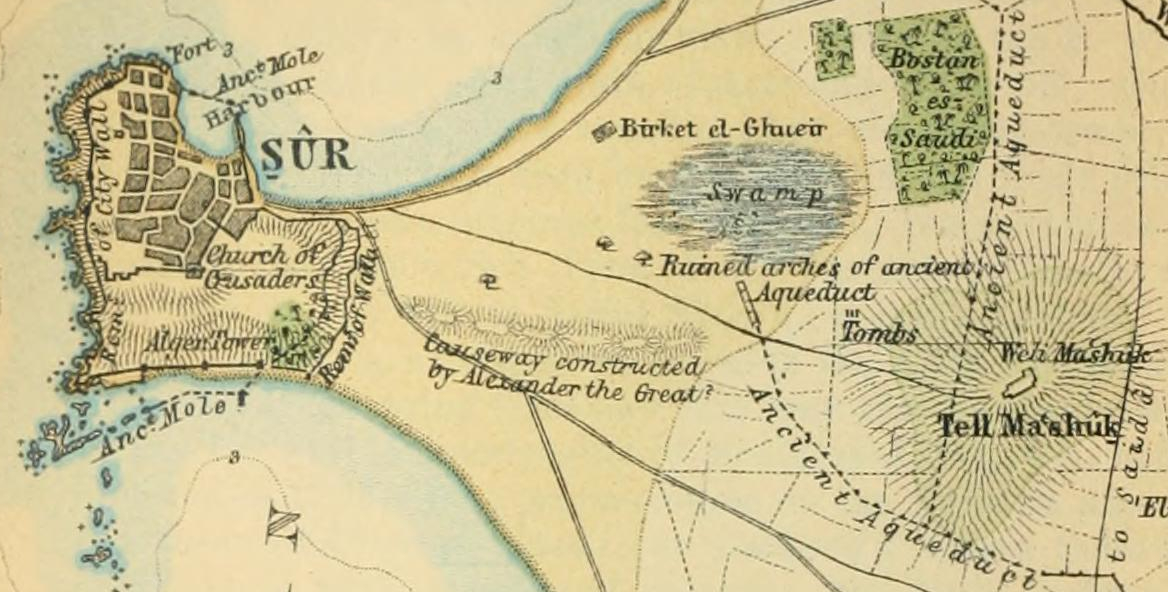
1906 map with El Buss as a swamp

=== Armenian and Palestinian refugee camps (1930s–today) ===
In 1920, the French colonial rulers proclaimed the new State of Greater Lebanon under the guardianship of the League of Nations represented by France. Tyre and the Jabal Amel were attached as the Southern part of the Mandate. In the 1930s, sometime after 1932, the French colonial authorities attributed the swampy area to survivors of the Armenian Genocide, who had started arriving in Tyre already in the early 1920s. A camp for Armenian refugees was set up there sometime between 1935 and 1936 and 1939. Lebanon gained independence from French colonial rule in 1943.

With the May 1948 declaration of the state of Israel, a Palestinian exodus – also known as the Nakba' – soon started, with thousands of Palestinian refugees fleeing to Tyre. El-Buss was one of the first sites which was assigned to the Palestinian refugees as a transit camp. The majority of the first wave of Palestinians who arrived in El-Buss were Palestinian Christians from Haifa and Akka. Most of them only found shelter in tents there. Soon the camp was overcrowded and more camps were set up in other parts of the country.

Initially, Armenians and Palestinians cohabited in the camp. In the course of the 1950s, the Armenian refugees from El Buss were resettled, while Palestinians from the Acre area in Galilee moved into the camp. Many of them were apparently agriculturalists. After the Six-Day War of June 1967 another wave of displaced Palestinians sought refuge, with some arriving in El Buss camps. As Tyre greatly expanded during the 1960s due to an increasing a rural-to-urban movement and many new buildings were constructed on the isthmus of the peninsula, El Buss became physically more integrated into the city. Conflict with Israel escalated over time, peaking during the 1973 October Yom Kippur War, followed the protracted Lebanese Civil War (1975–1990) with repeated Israeli incursions and invasions during fighting against Lebanese and Palestinian armed factions, which continue until this day.

== Archaeological research history ==
=== Excavations 1957–1967 ===
In 1957, large-scale excavations of the Roman-Byzantine necropolis in El Buss started under the leadership of Emir Maurice Chéhab (1904–1994), "the father of modern Lebanese archaeology" who for decades headed the Antiquities Service in Lebanon and was the curator of the National Museum of Beirut. The works stopped in 1967 and because of the political turmoil that followed Chehab could not take them up again. Publication of his research materials was never completed either. The whereabouts of most of the finds and the excavation documentation are unknown.

=== 1980s: looting, Tyre declared World Heritage Site ===
In 1984, the United Nations Educational, Scientific and Cultural Organisation (UNESCO) declared Tyre, including el Buss, a World Heritage Site in an attempt to halt the damage being done to the archaeological sites by the armed conflict and by anarchic urban development.

In the late 1980s, "clandestine excavations" took place in the Al-Bass cemetery which "flooded the antiquities market".

=== 1990s: excavations and war damage ===
In 1990, a necropolis from the Iron Age was discovered in El Buss "by chance".

In 1997, Spanish-led archaeological excavations started at El-Buss. They were conducted for eleven years and exposed an area of some 500 square meter of cremation graves.

=== Since 2000 ===
During Israel's invasion in the July 2006 Lebanon War, El Buss was apparently less affected than other parts of Tyre, buy at least one building close to the necropolis was hit by Israeli bombardments which also caused damage to a part of the frescoes of a Roman funerary cave.

== The Roman and Byzantine necropolis ==
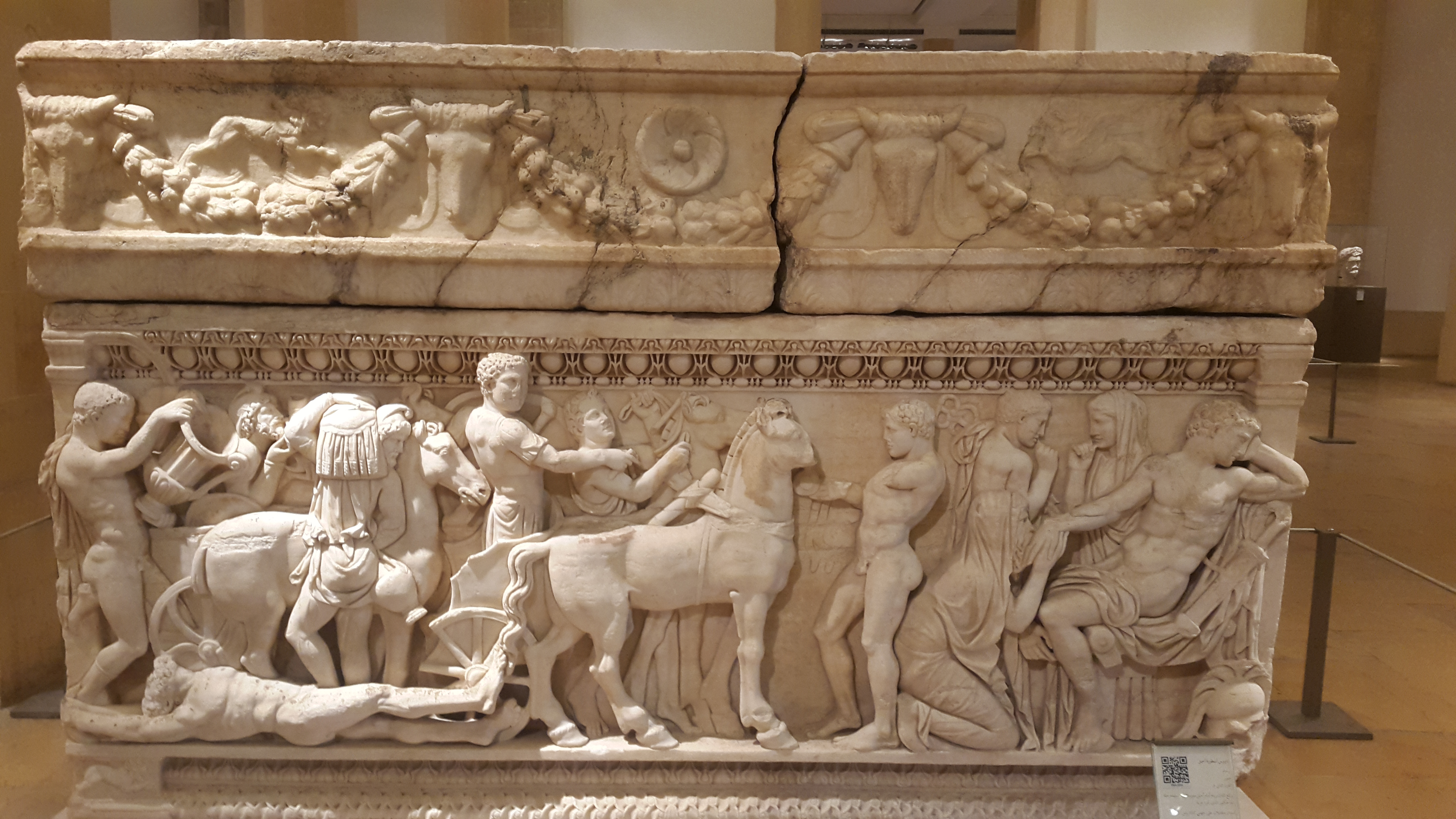
Sarcophagus with the legend of Achilles, found in Tyre, now in the National Museum of Beirut

Discovered in 1962, the necropolis consists of hundreds of stone and marble sarcophagi from the Roman and Byzantine eras. Several of them have Greek inscriptions or the names of those buried there, or their trade such as "wealthy purple dye manufacturer." Others whose sides and covers are decorated with frescoes and bas-reliefs of works from Homer and others.

The Triumphal Arch is one of the most impressive relics of the site. Fallen apart but reconstructed in modern times, it dominates the well preserved Roman avenue which has a necropolis on either side scattered with hundreds of ornate stones and sculptured marble sarcophagi dating from the 2nd through the 6th century AD.

== The Phoenician necropolis ==
In the northern section of the site, there is a Phoenician necropolis of the ninth century BCE formed by dug graves containing urns and funerary stelae.

== Conservation of the site ==
Hostilities during 2006 threatened the site when a nearby building was bombarded. A post-conflict analysis by conservation experts found that many of the frescoes had sustained damage. This, combined with the significant lack of maintenance at the site, represents significant threats to the site.

The site was already plundered in the 1990s. Find disappeared in the illegal antiquities market and some obelisks are now displayed at Nabu museum in El-Heri, Lebanon.

== Gallery: Roman and Byzantine findings ==
=== Sarcophagi ===
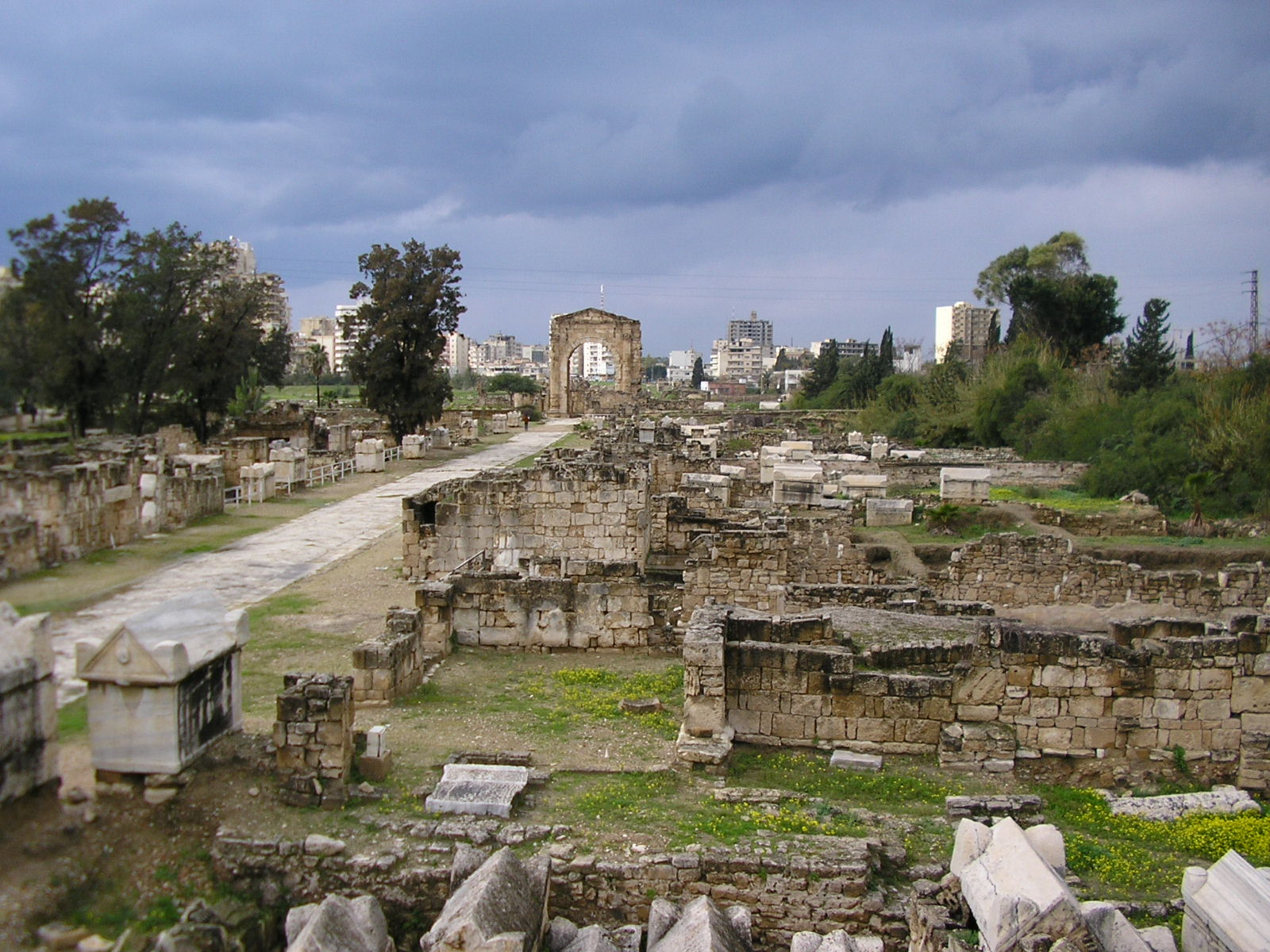

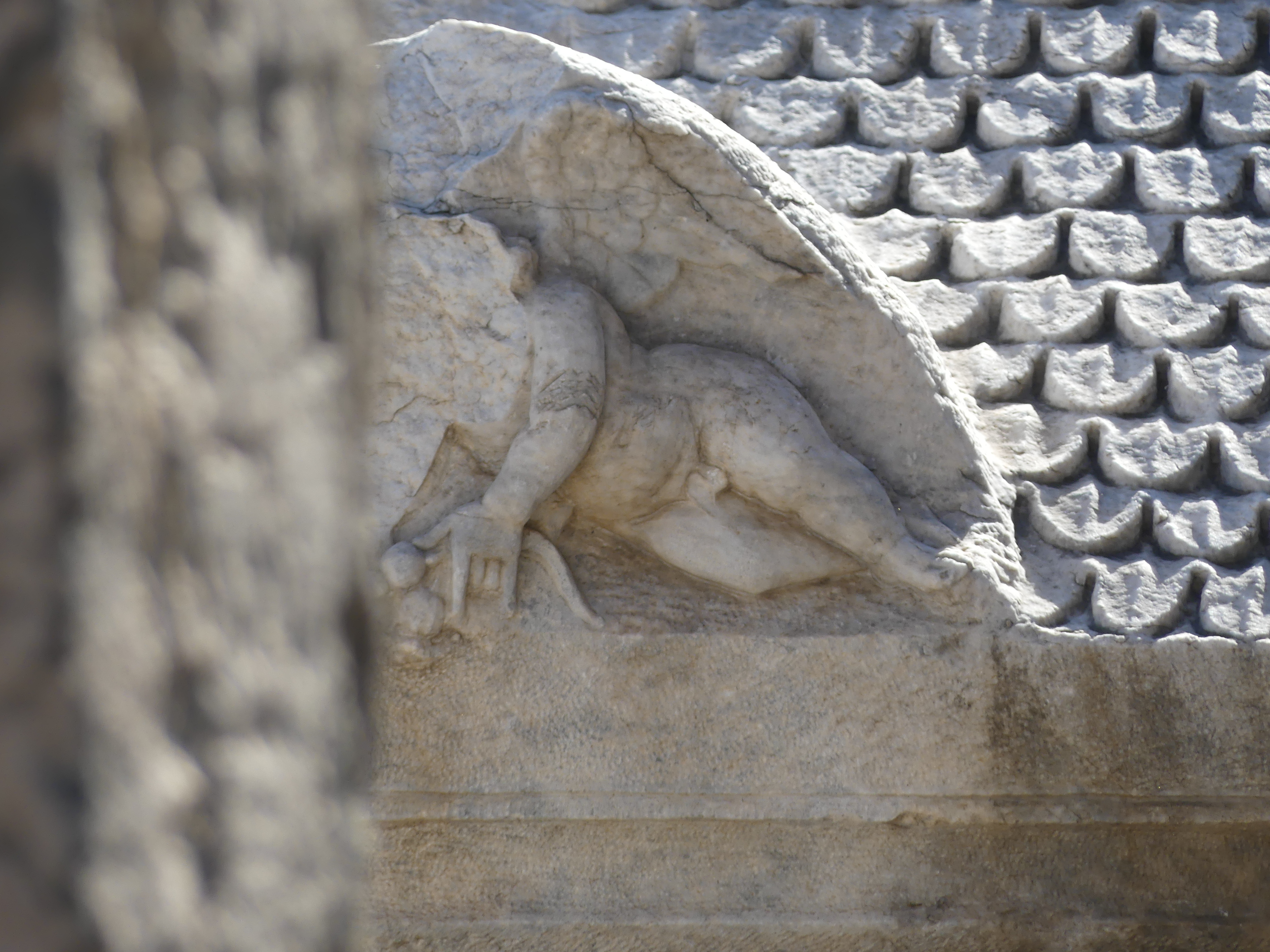

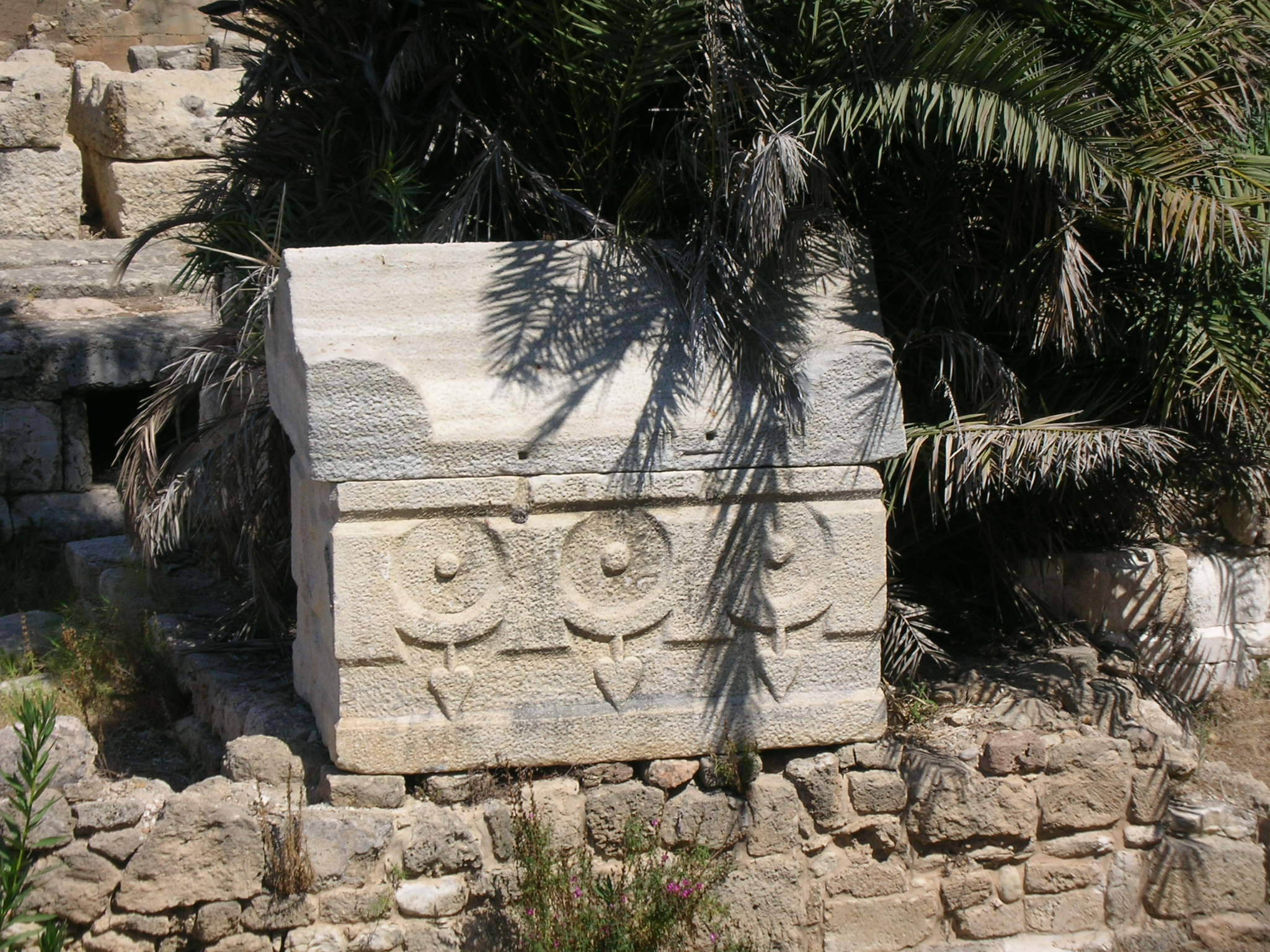

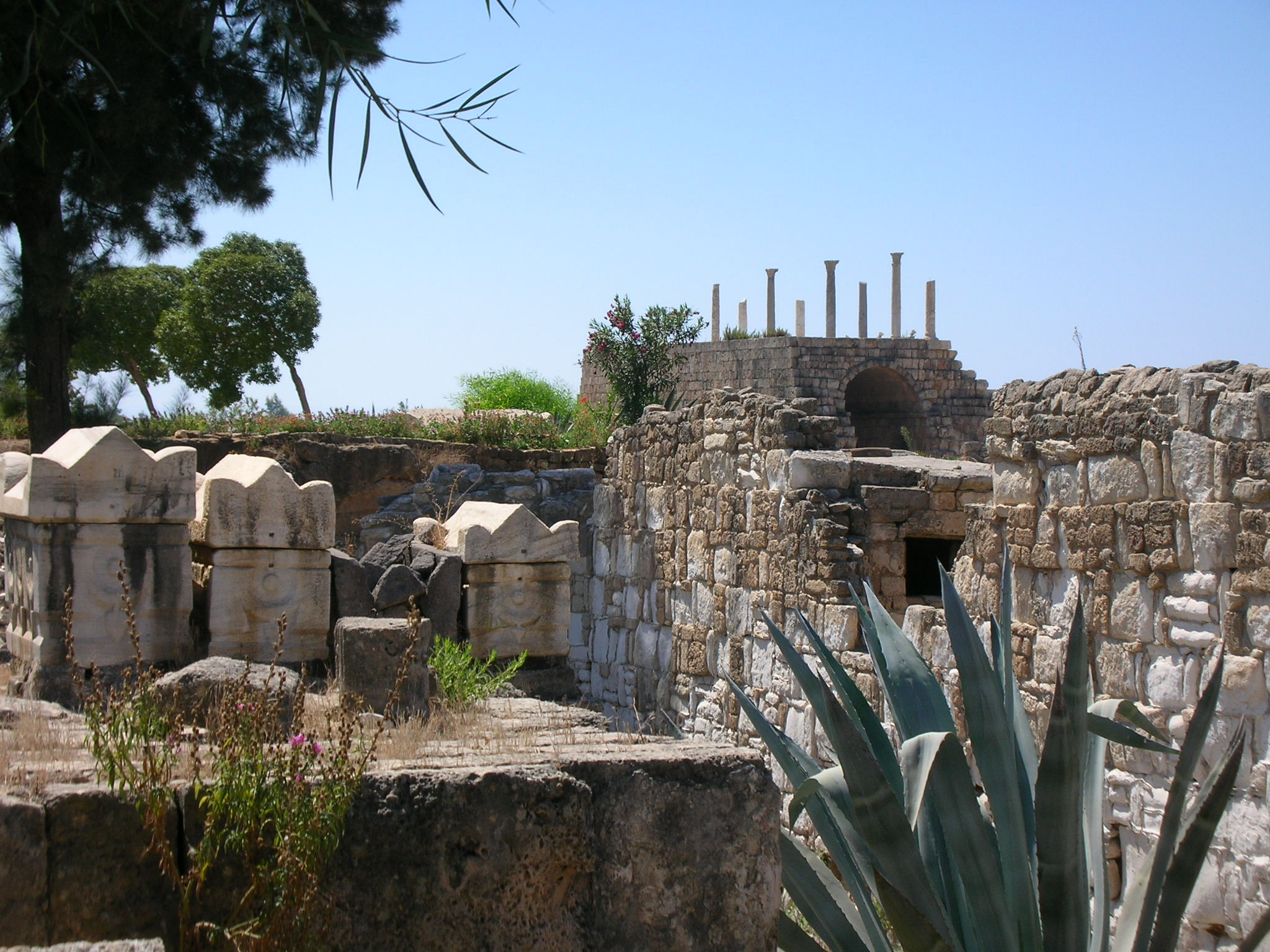

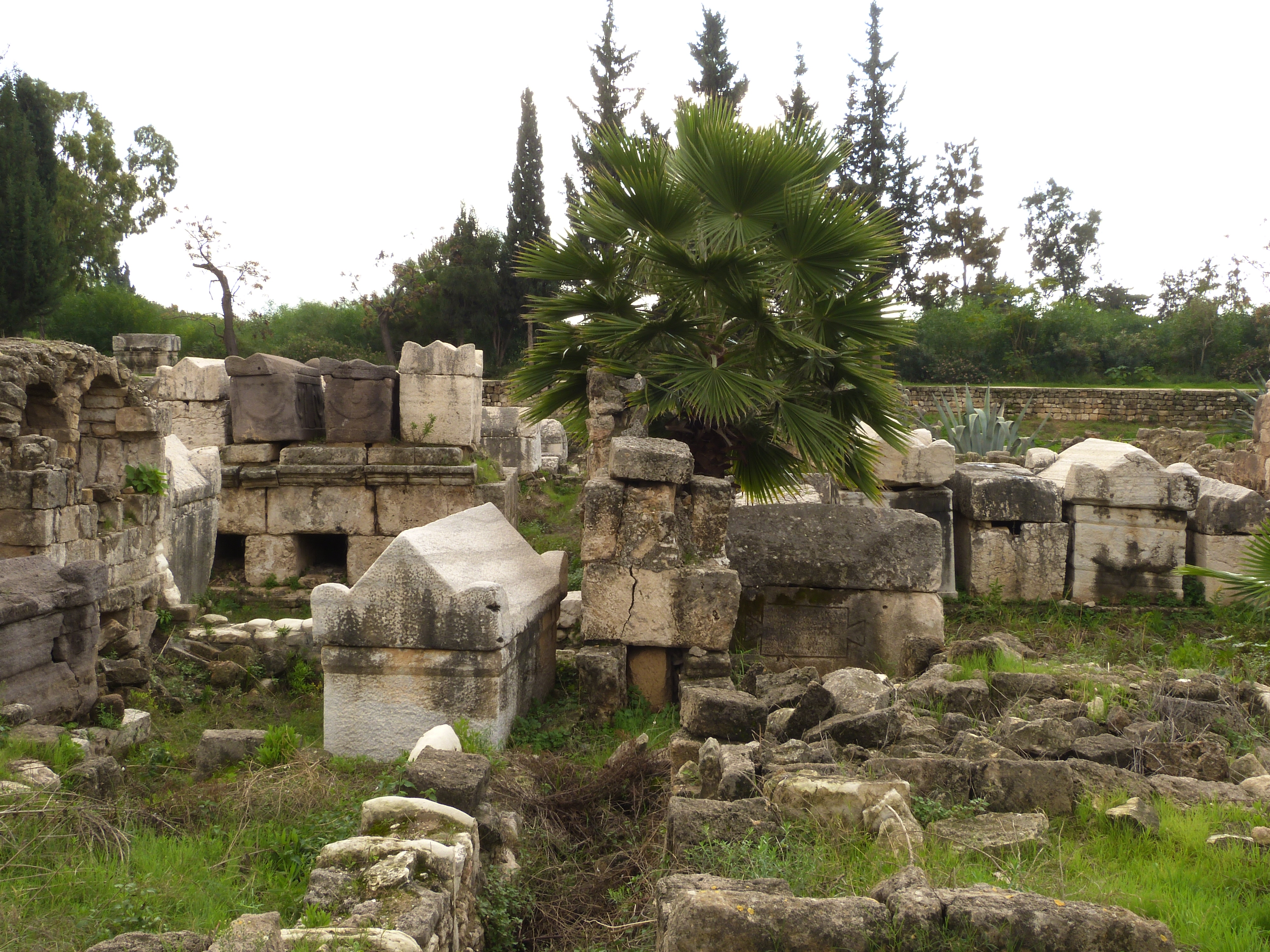

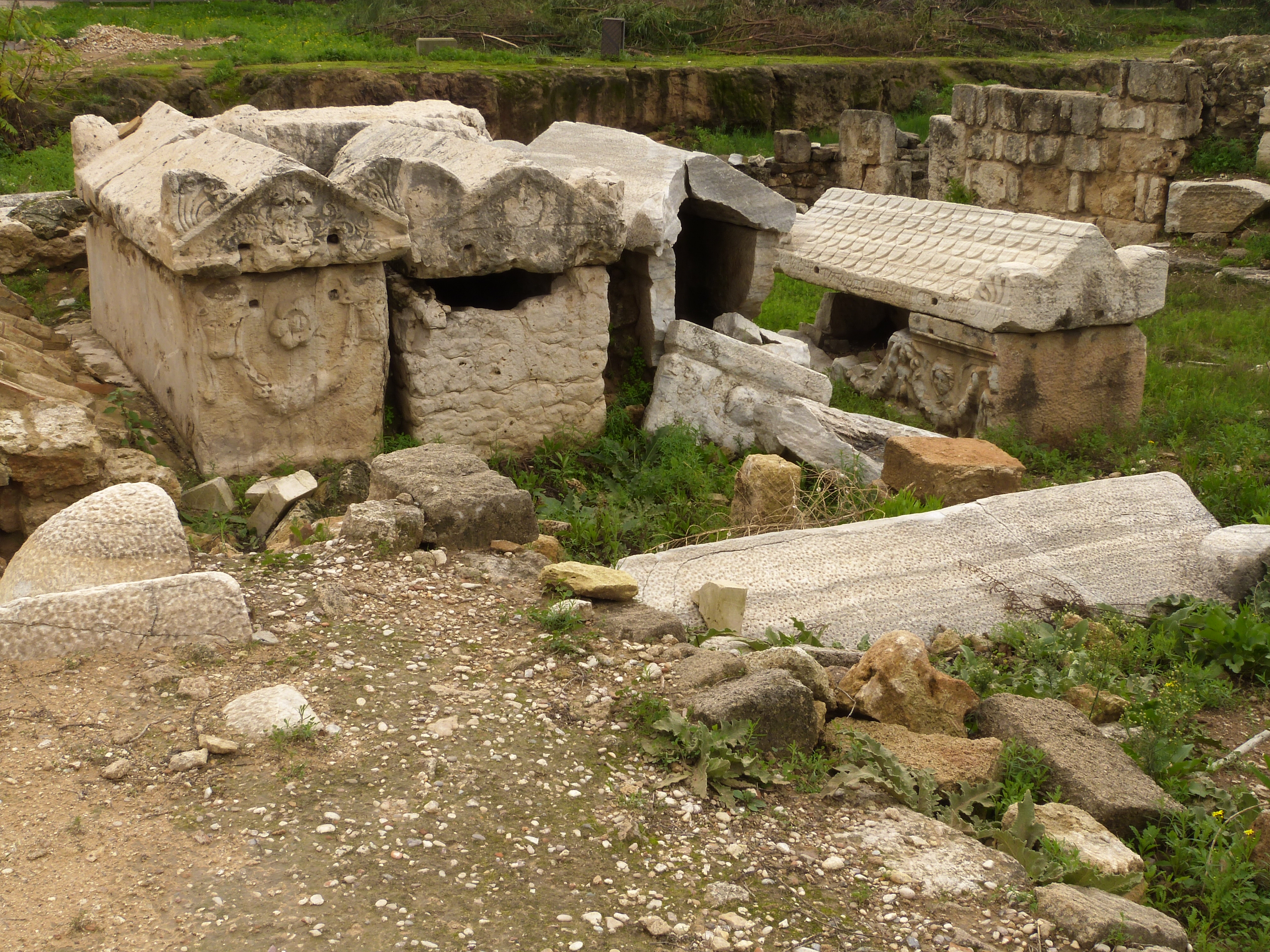

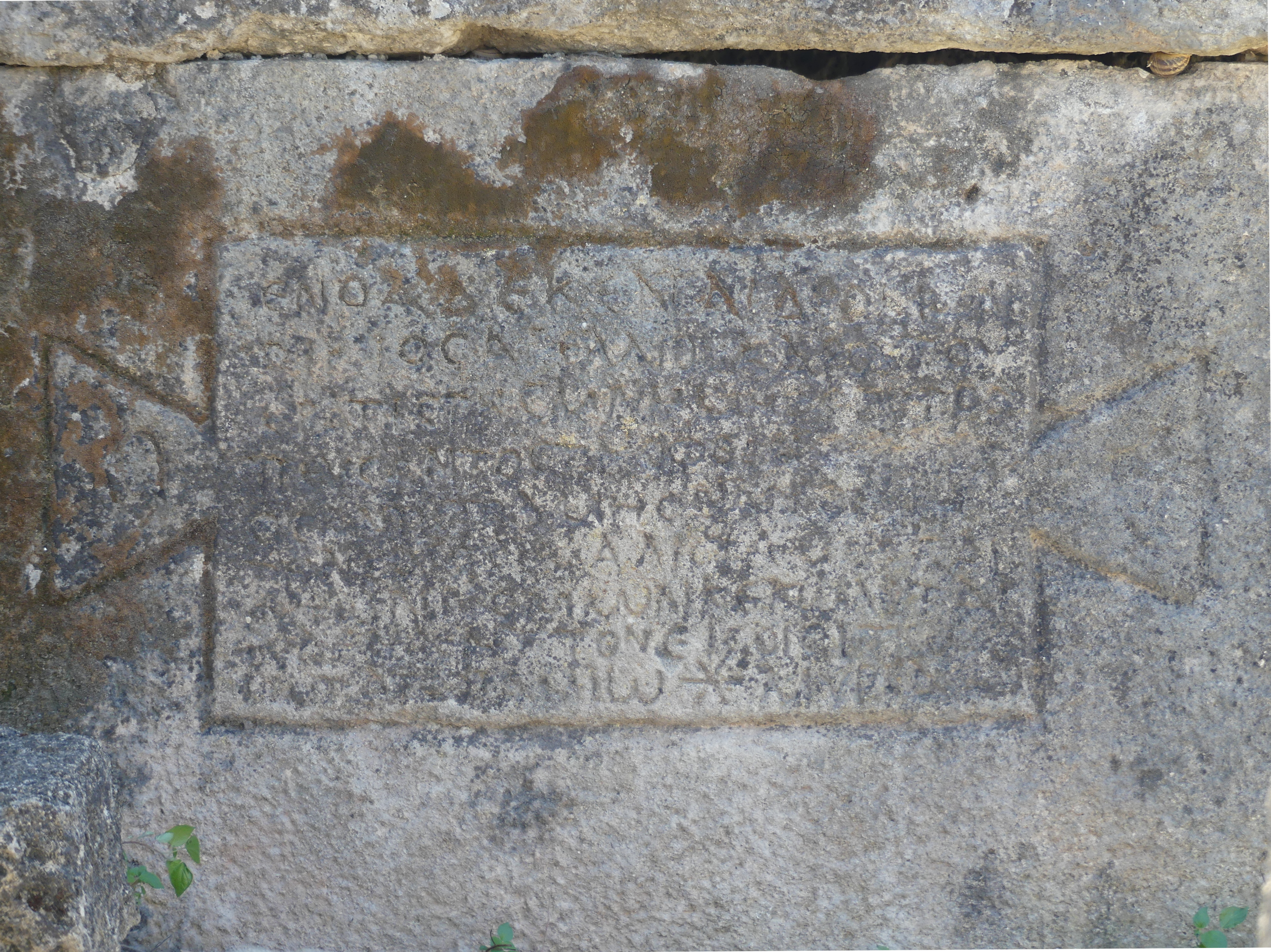

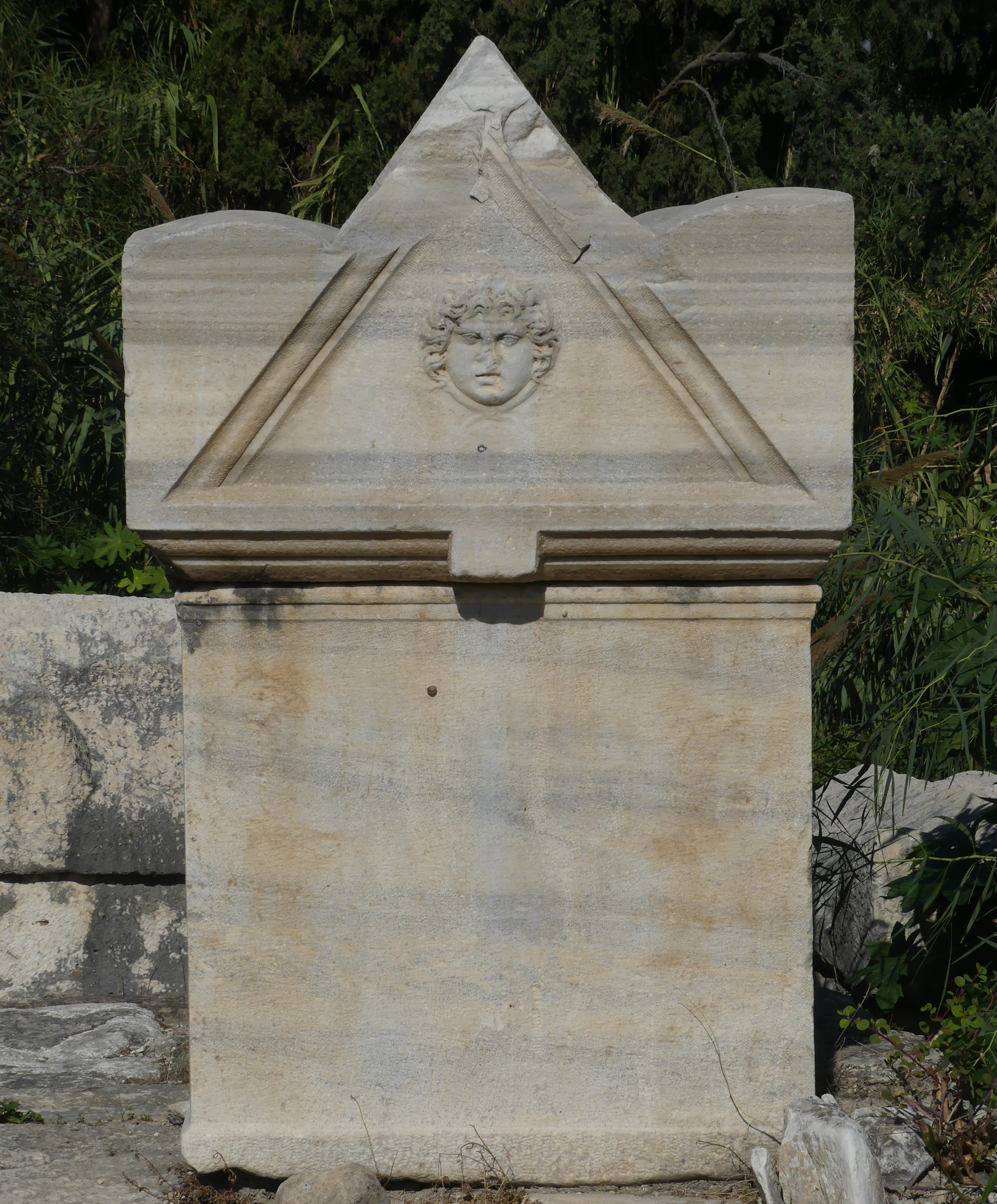

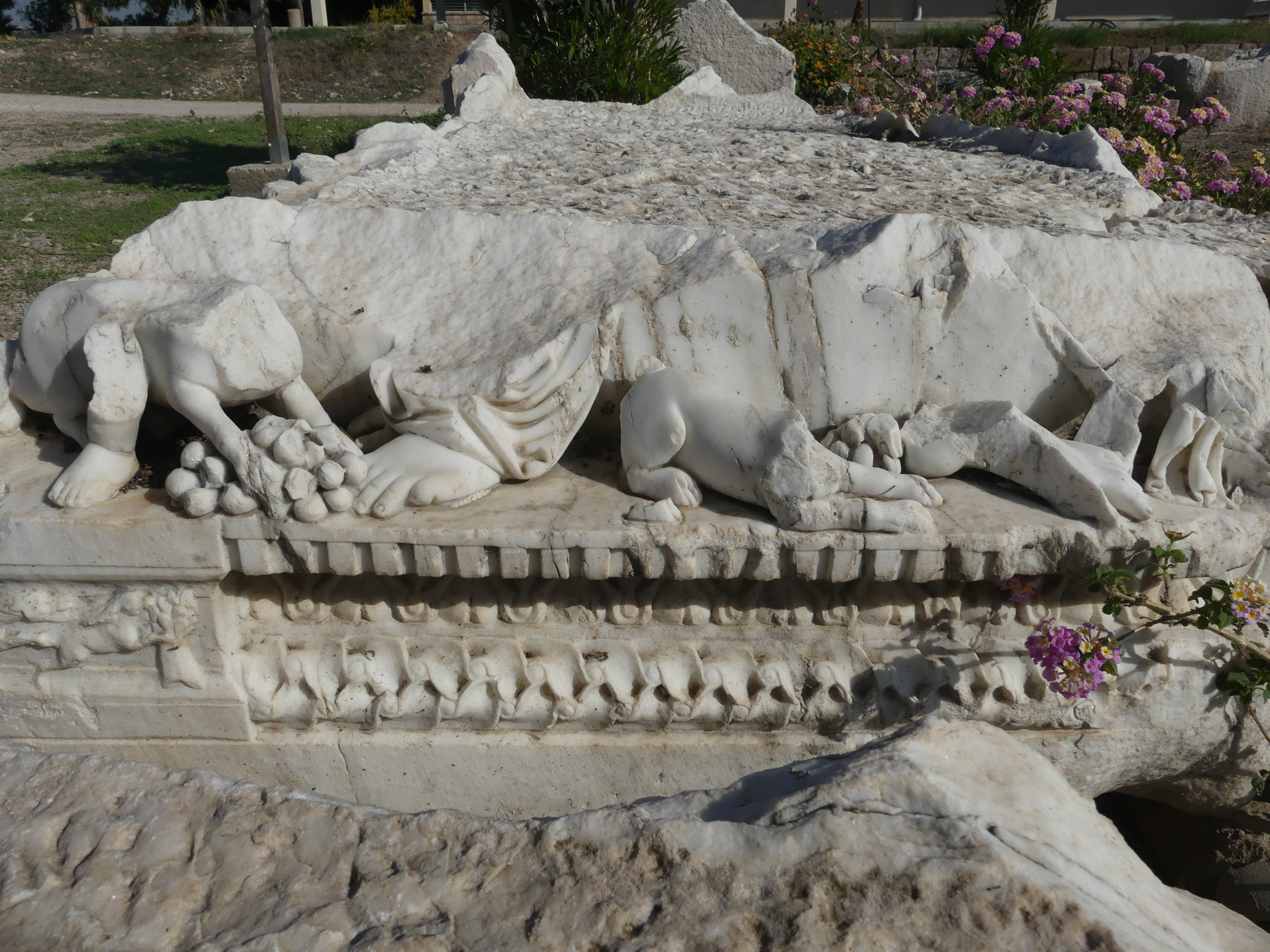

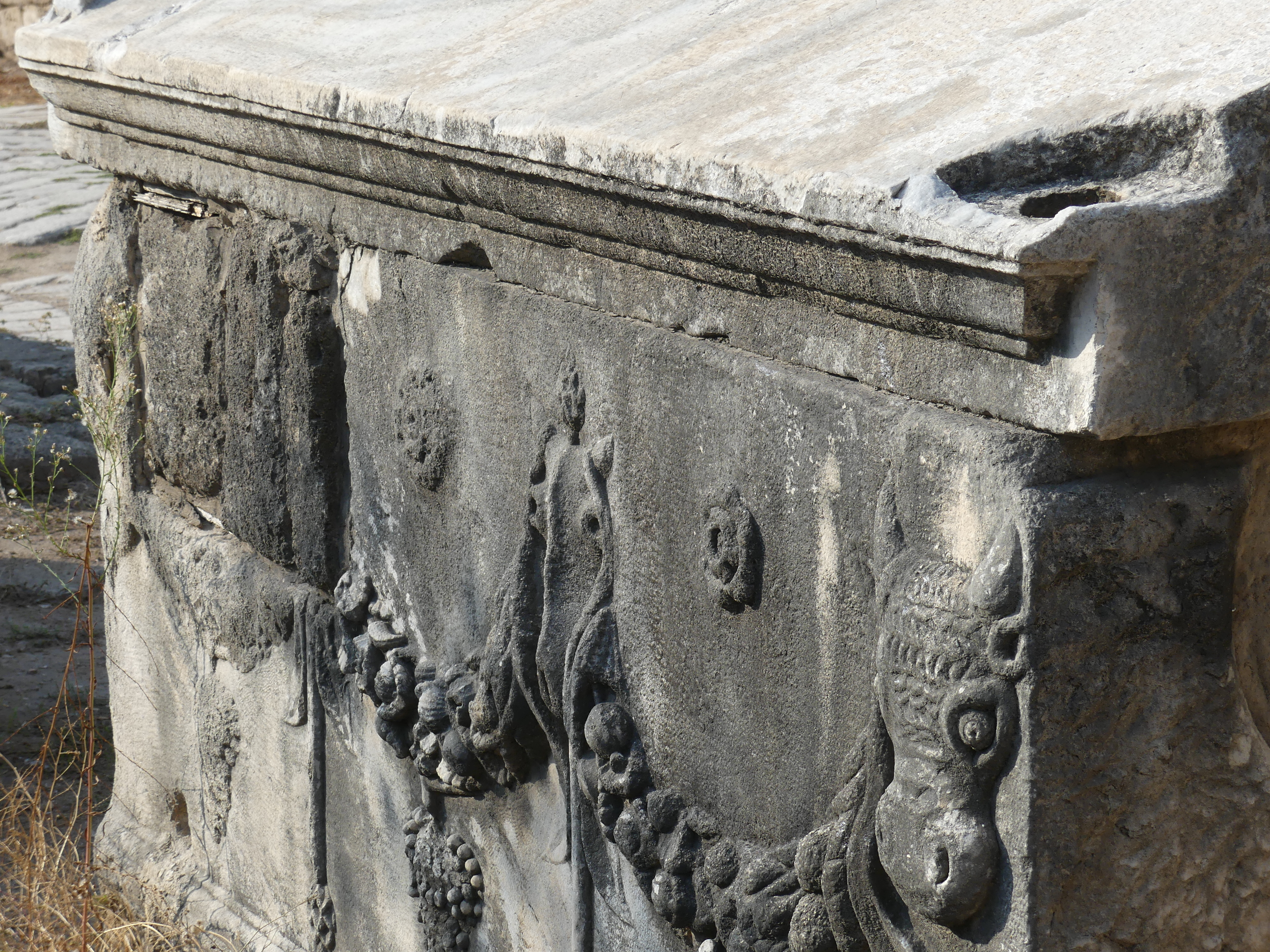

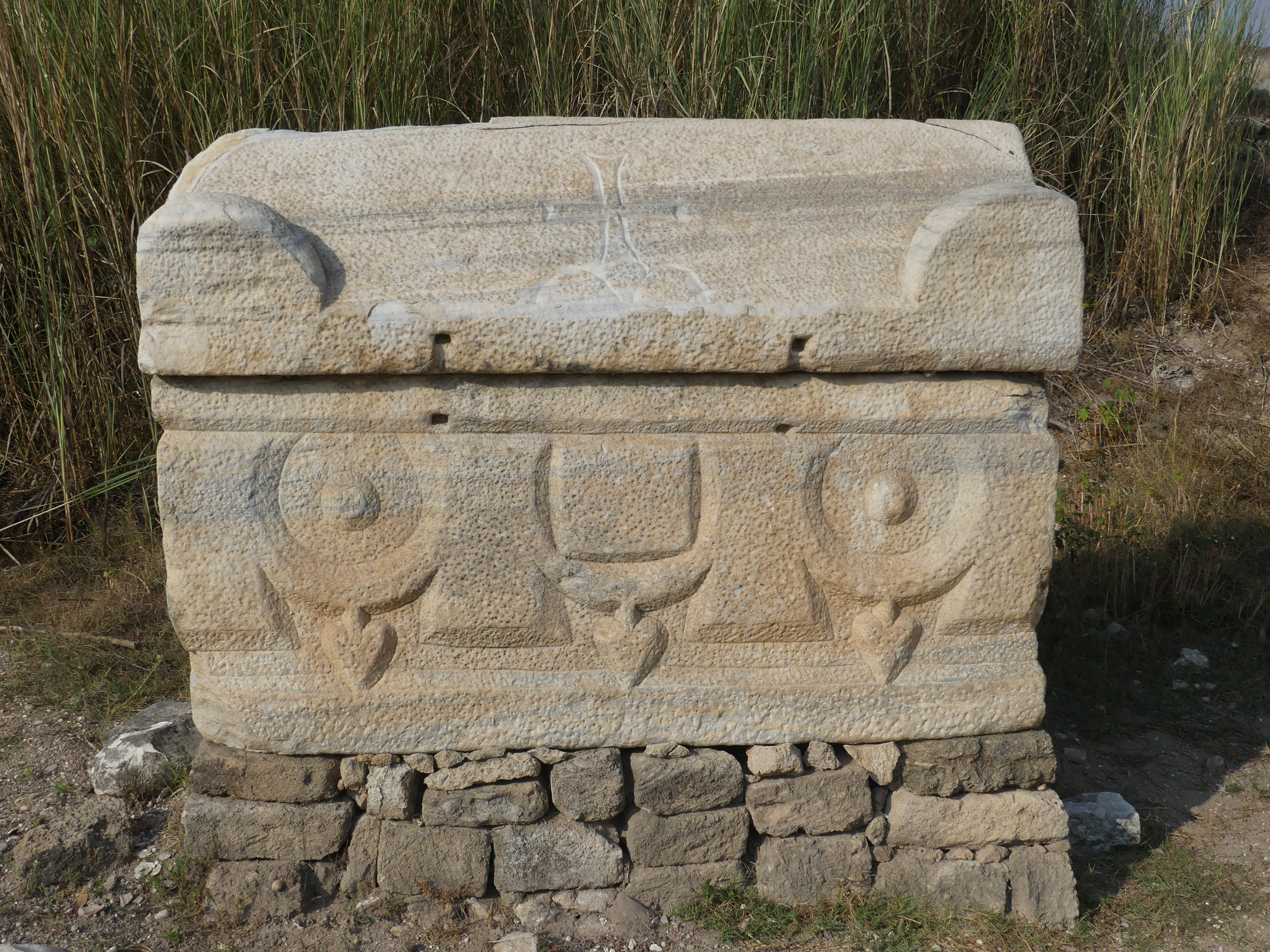

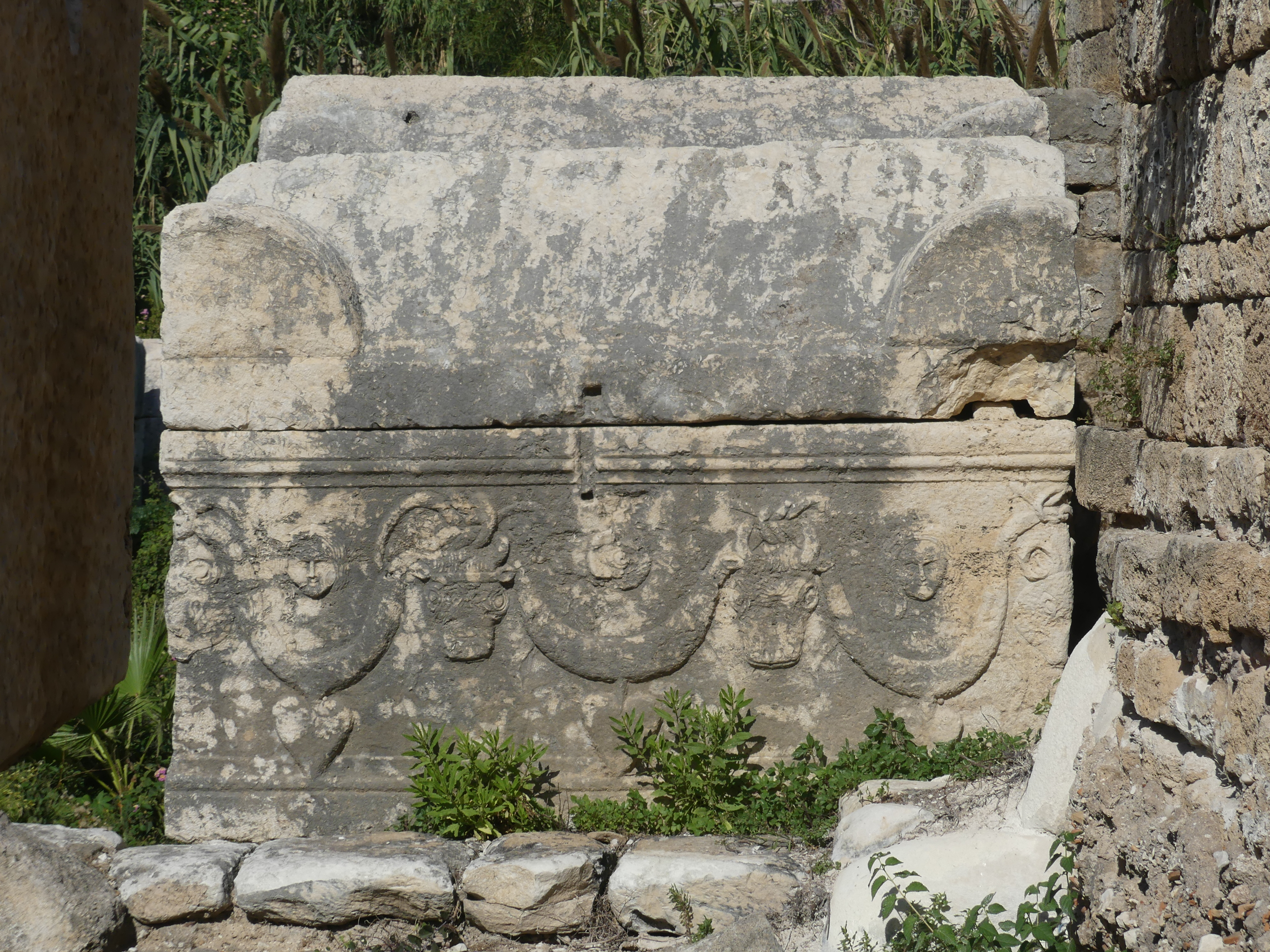

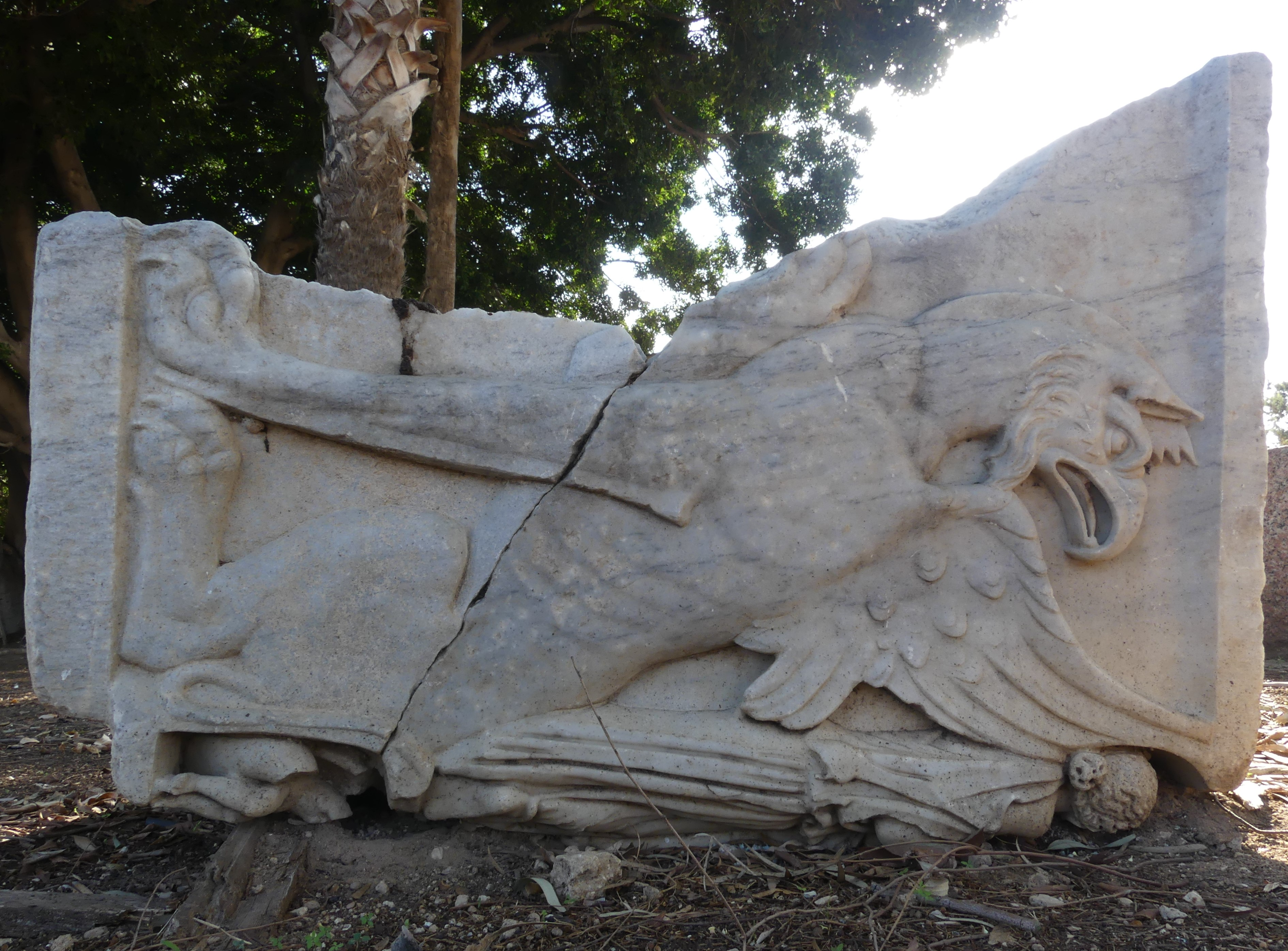

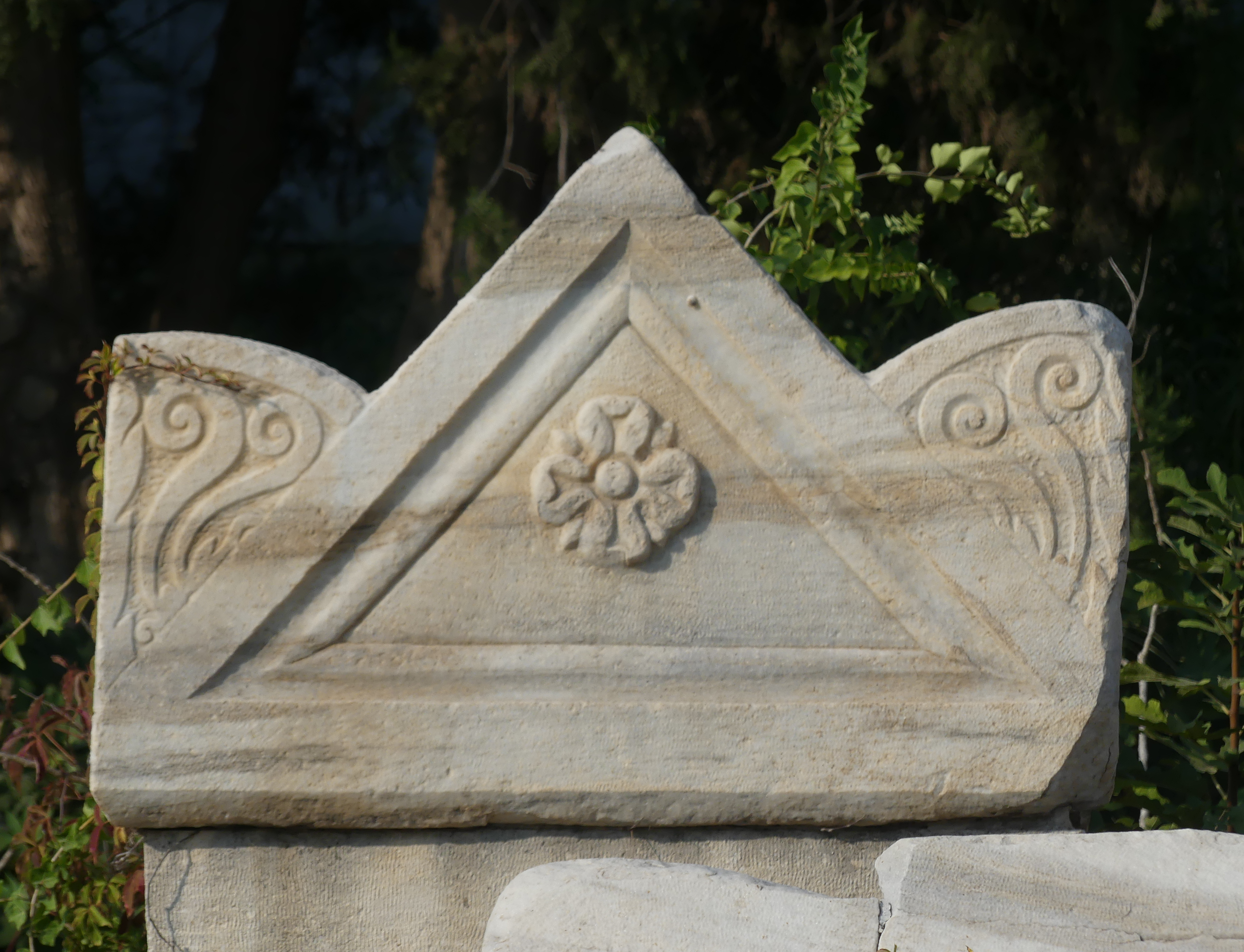

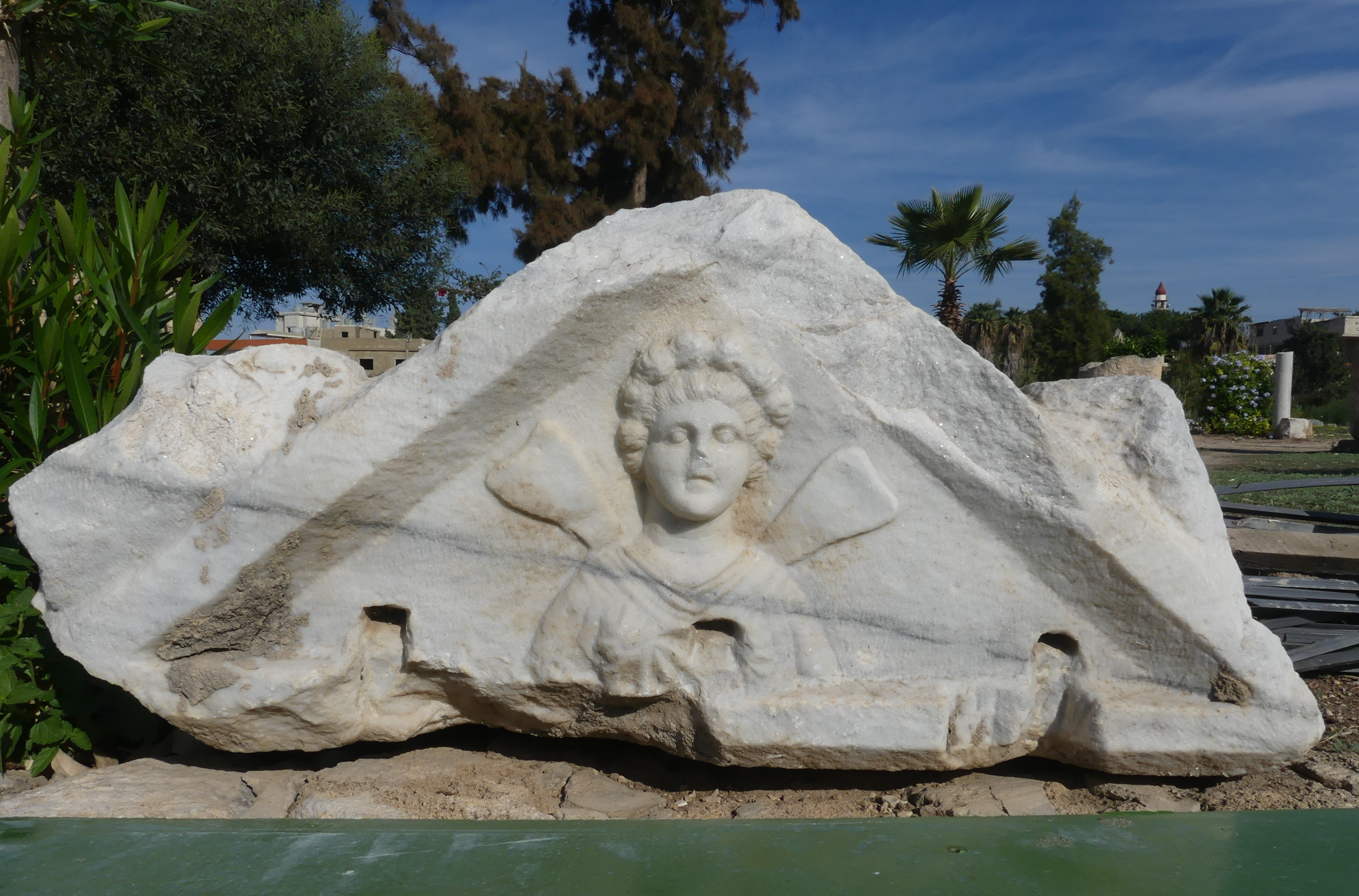

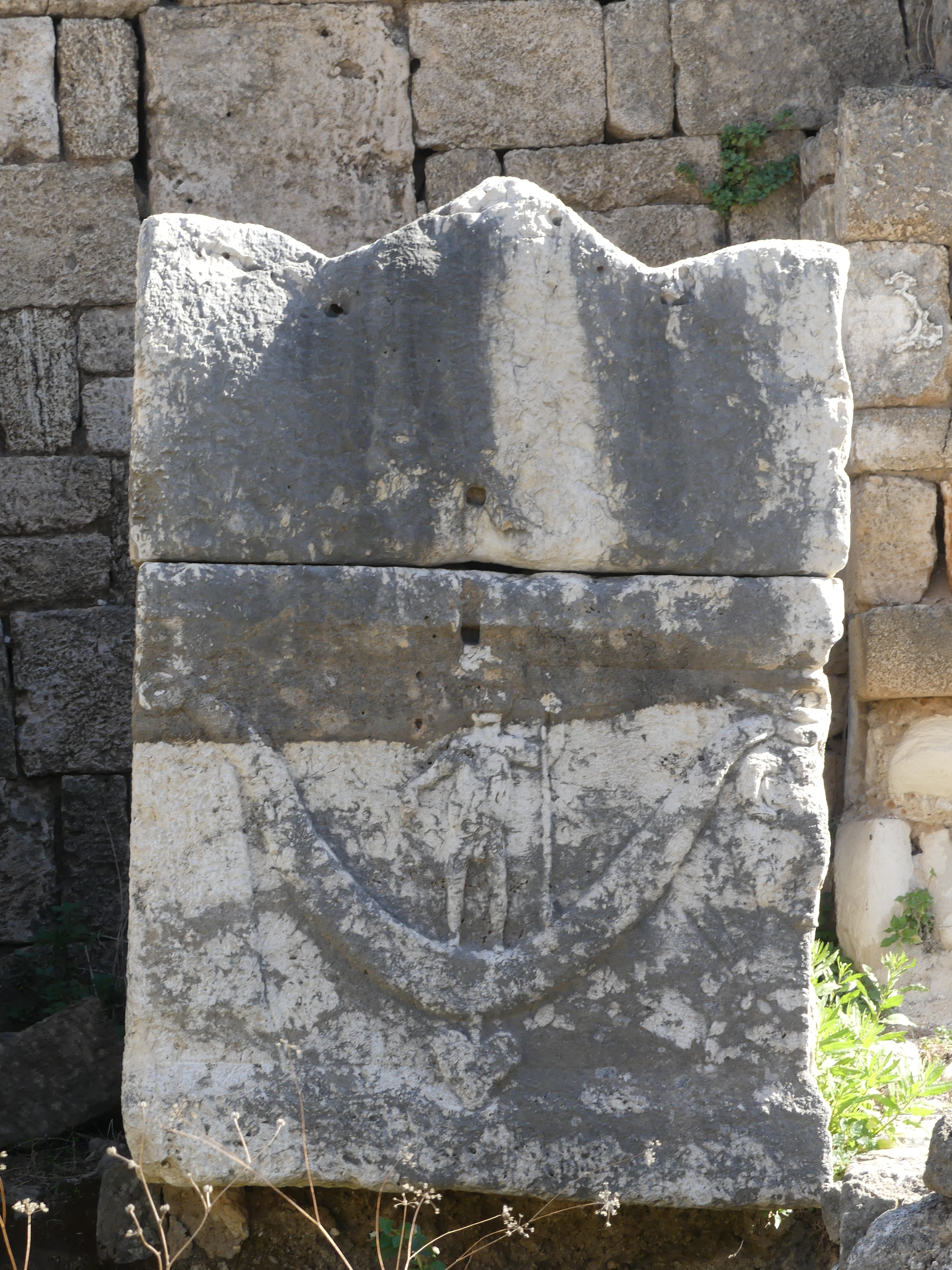

=== Church mosaics ===
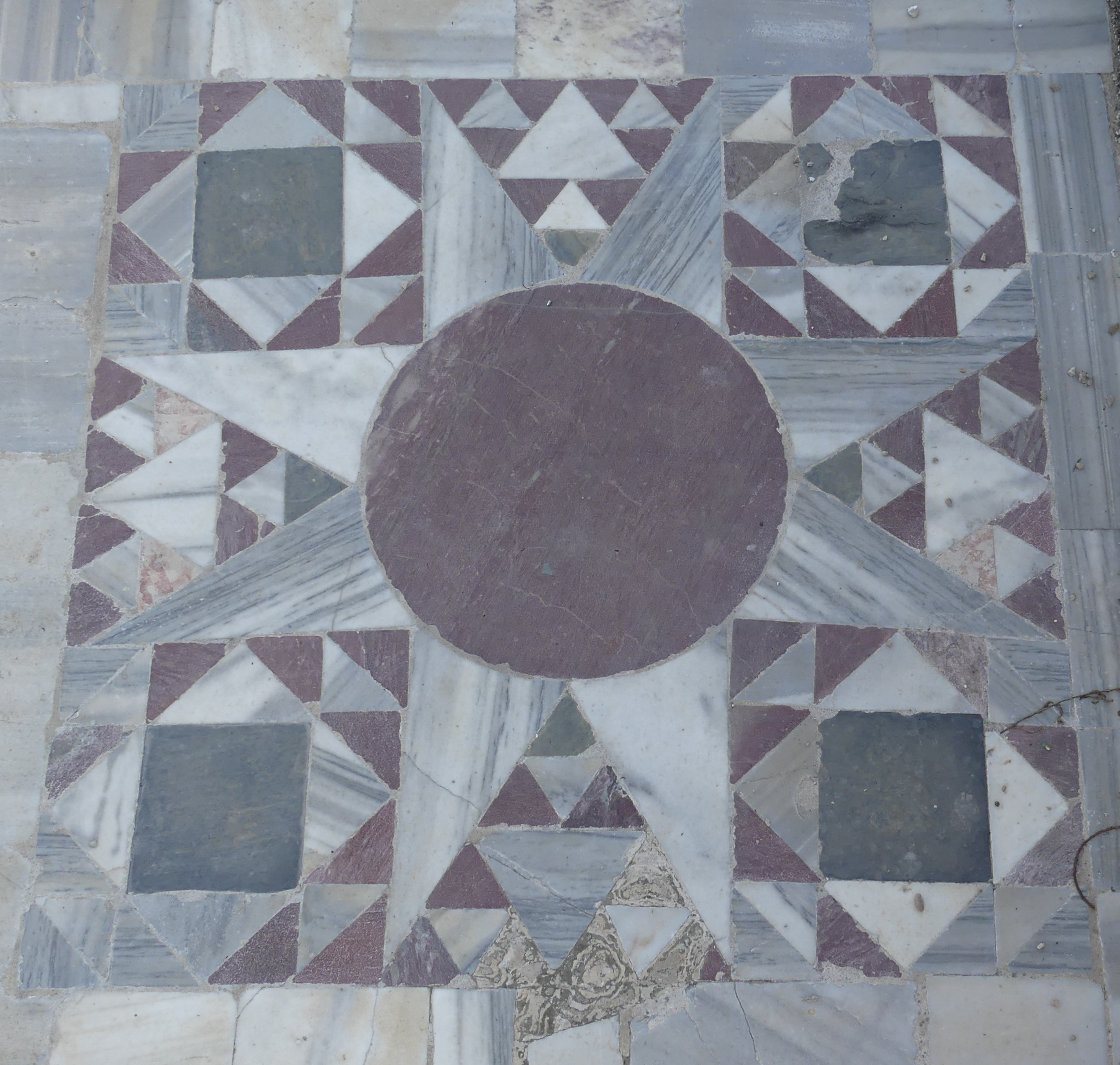

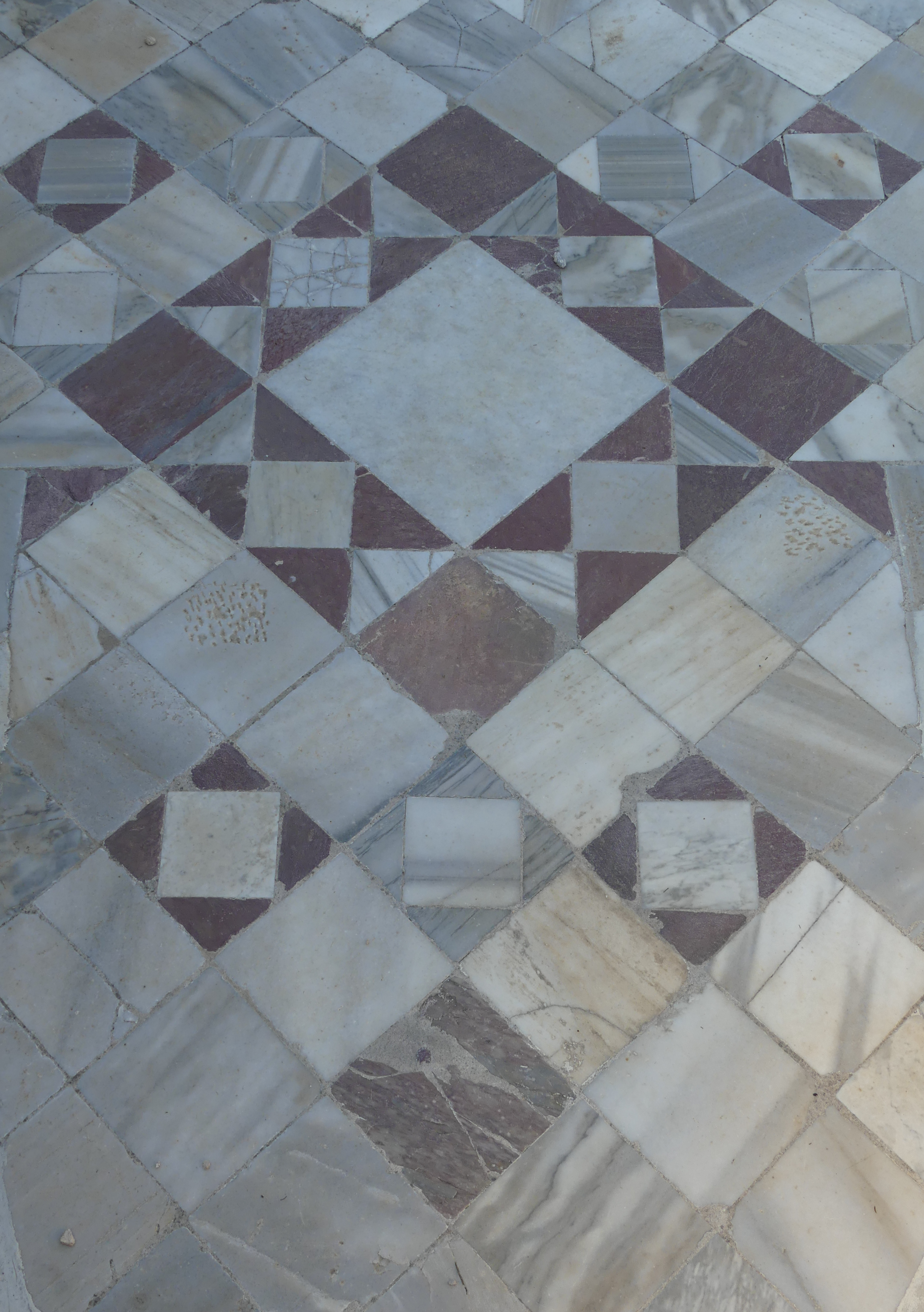

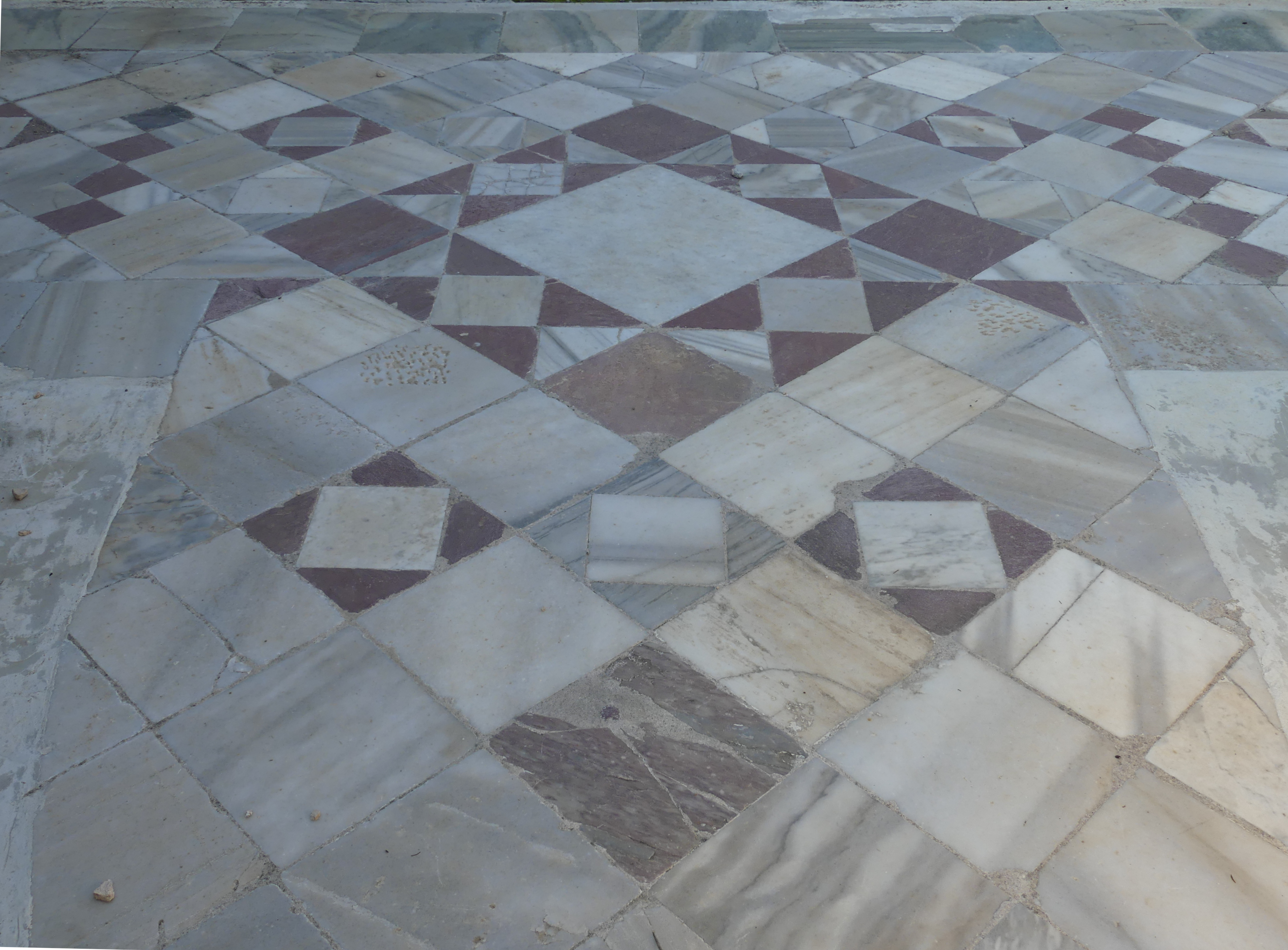

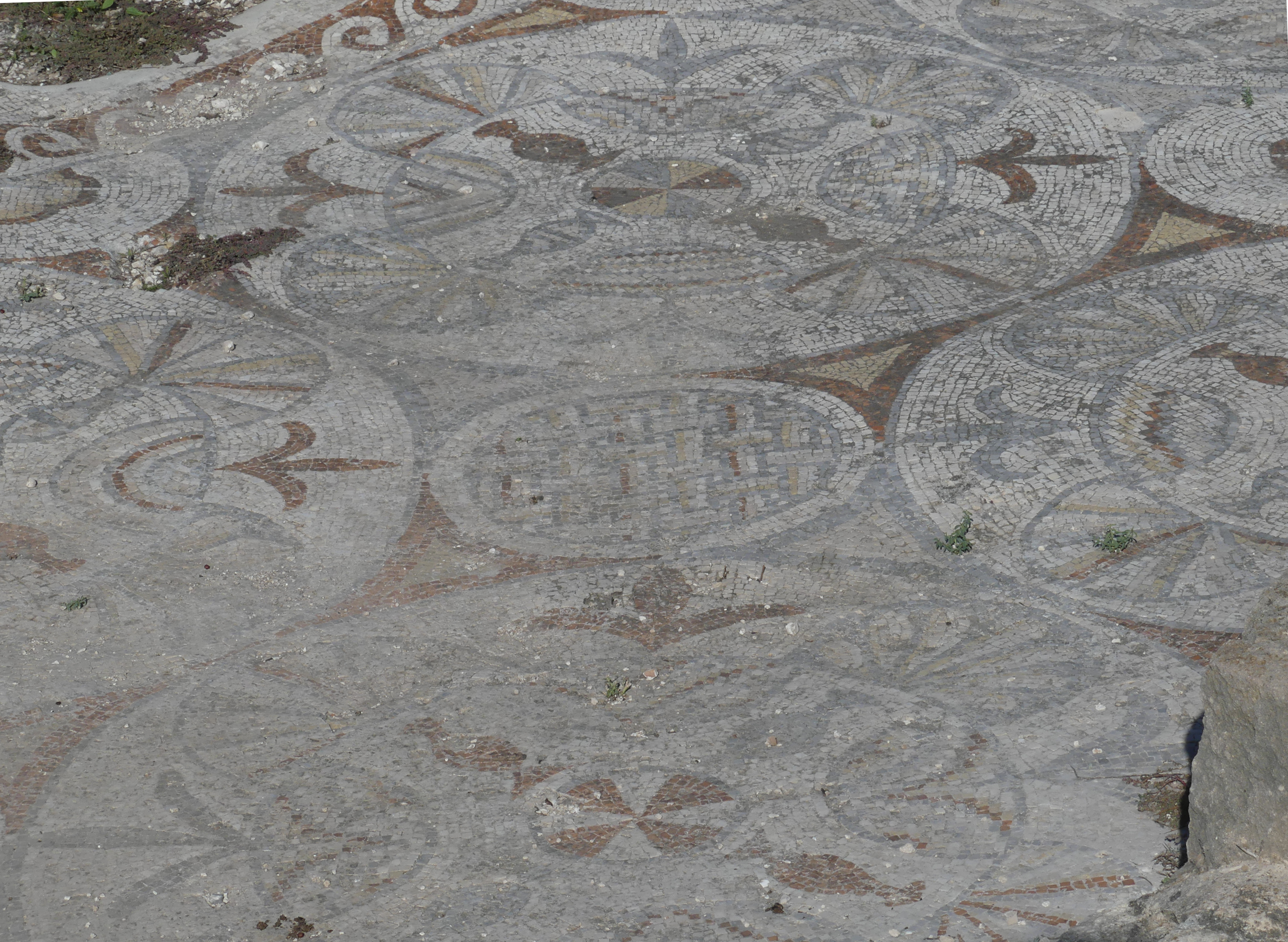

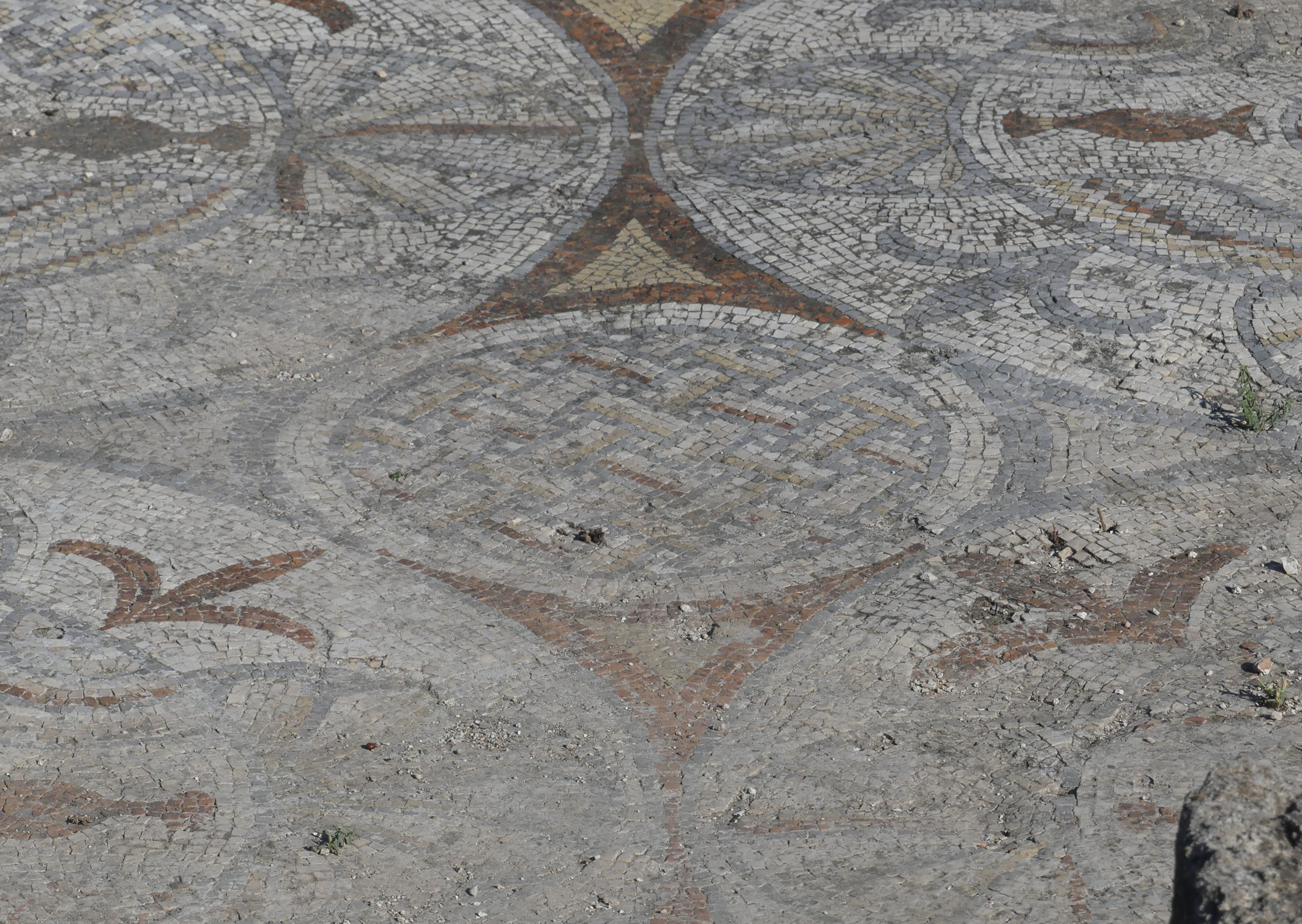

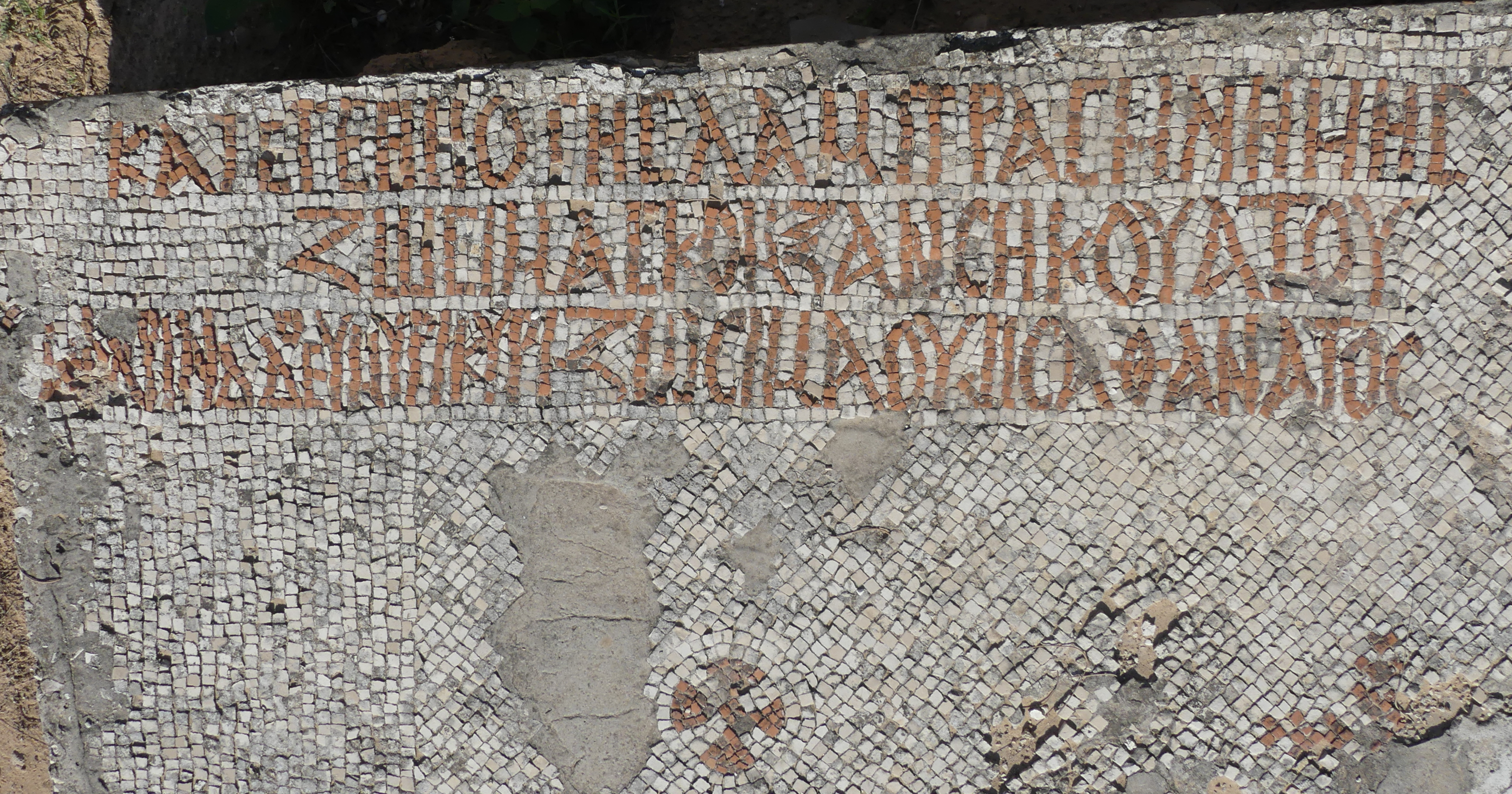

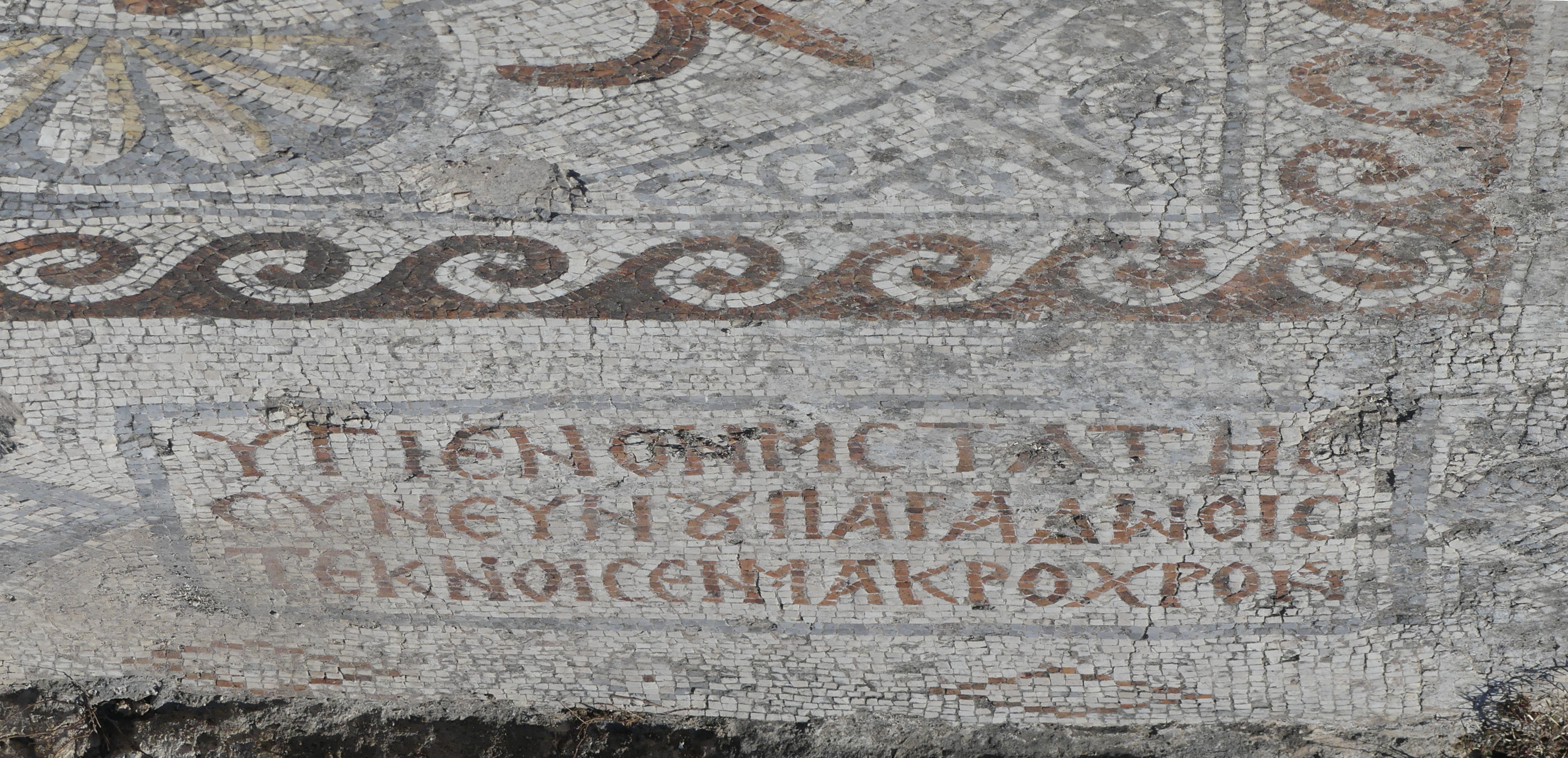

=== Triumphal arch ===
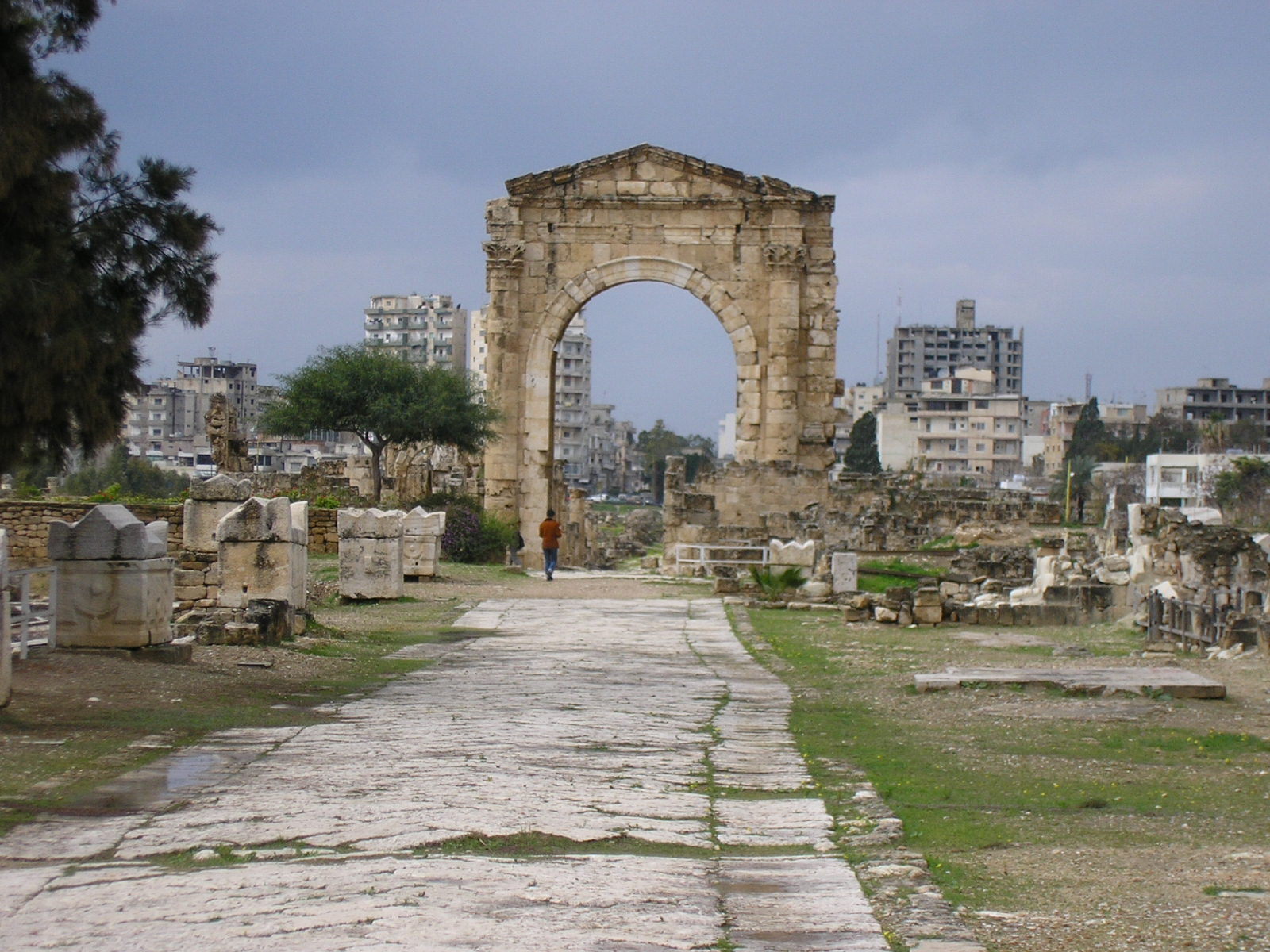

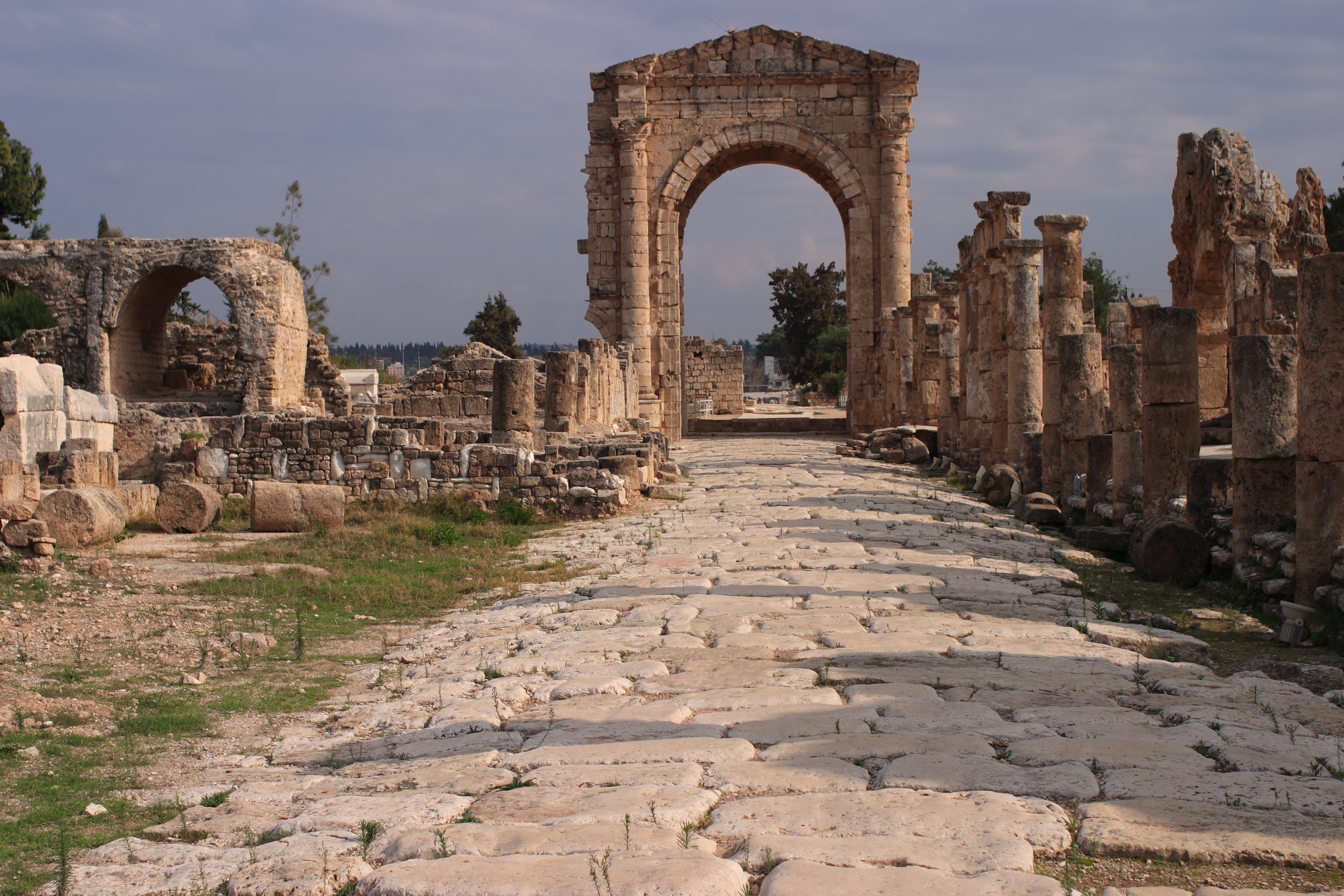

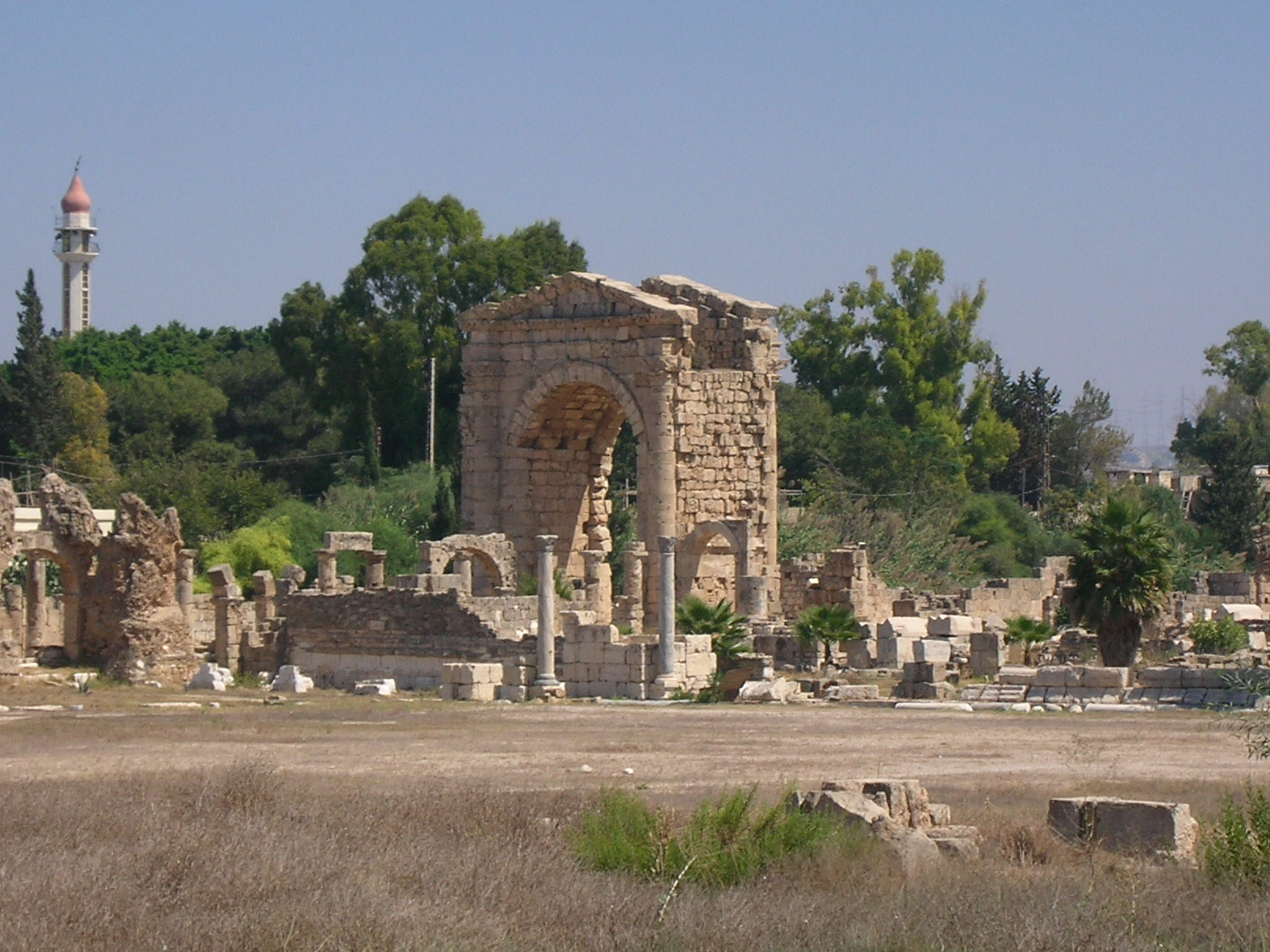

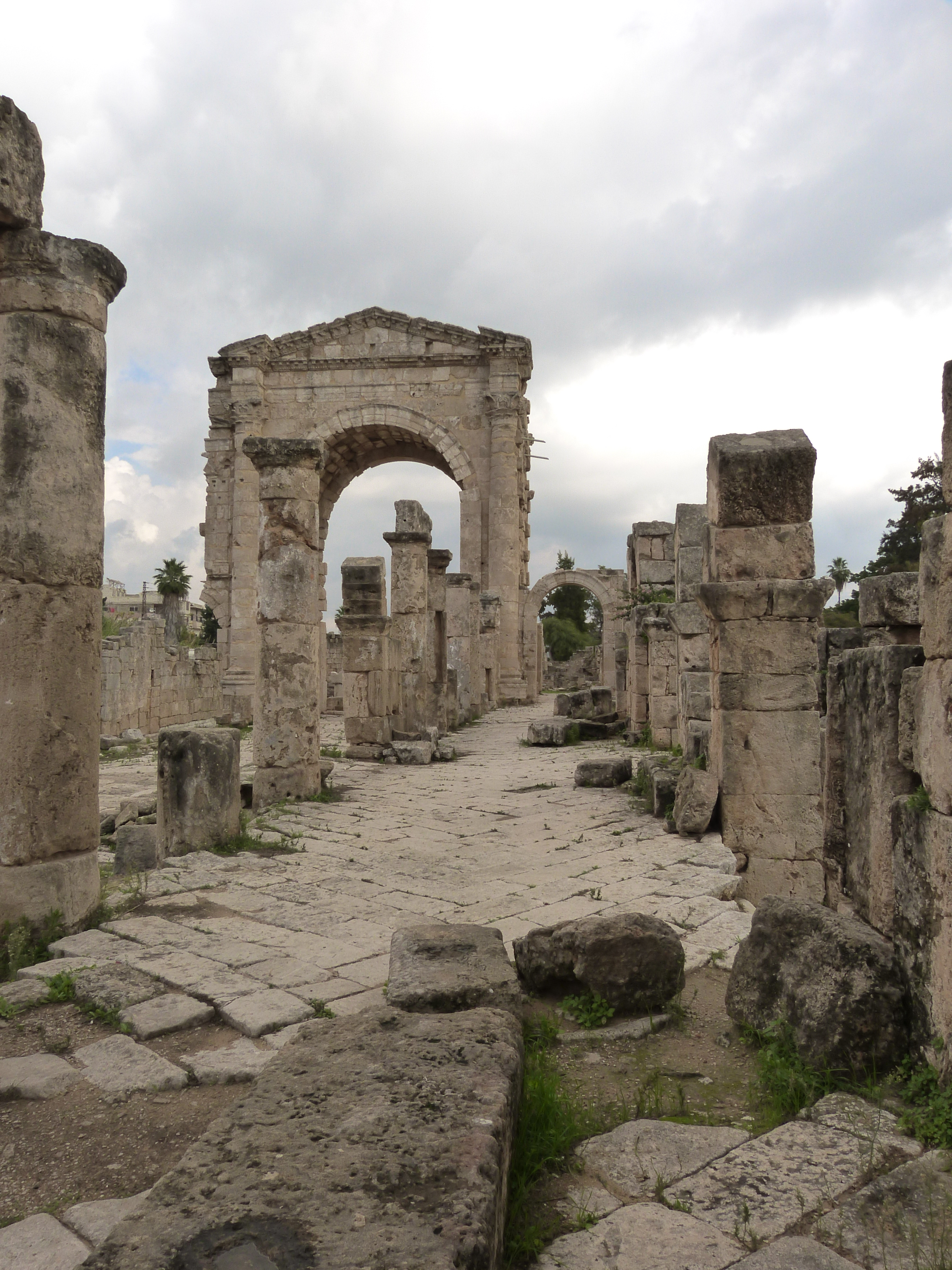

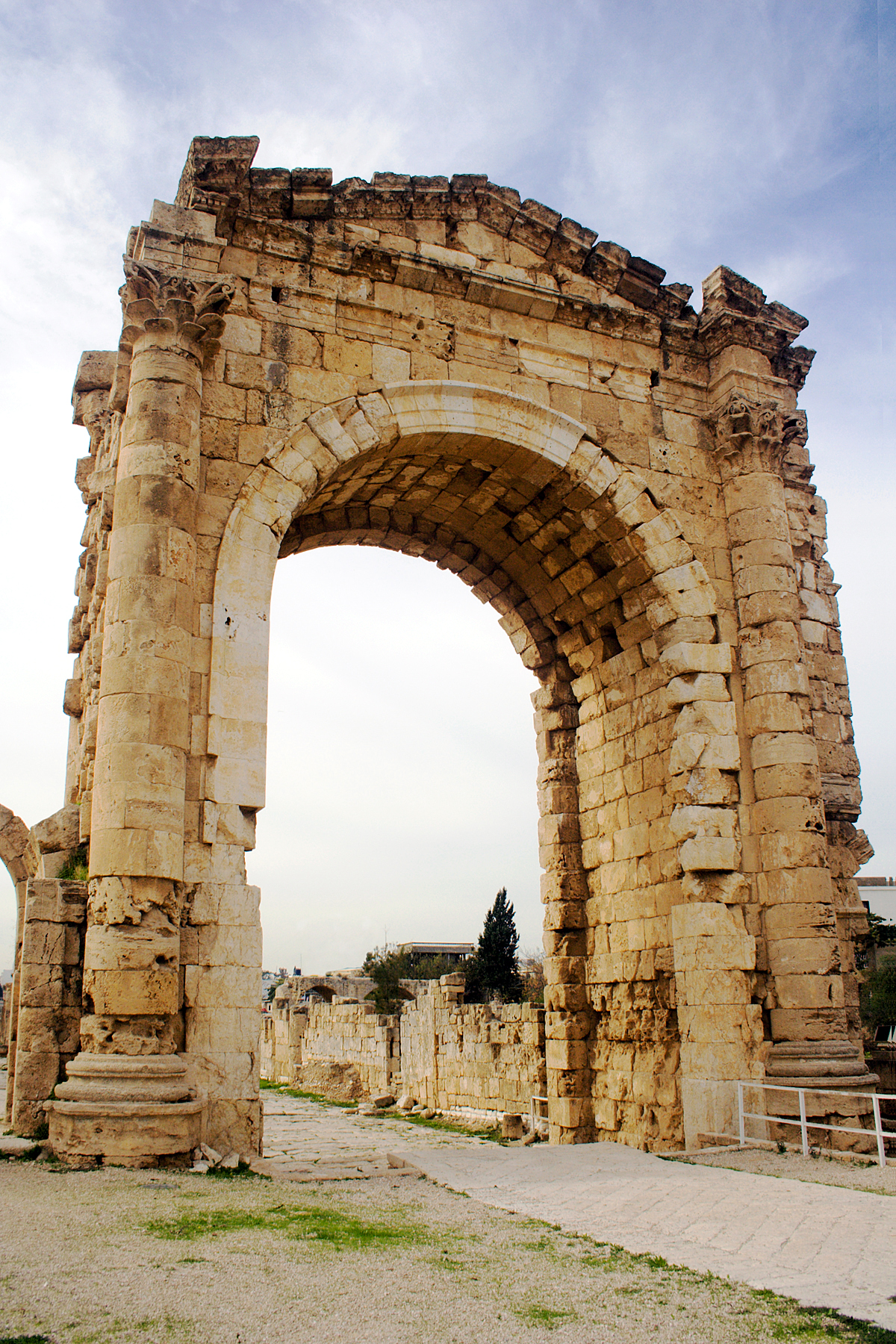

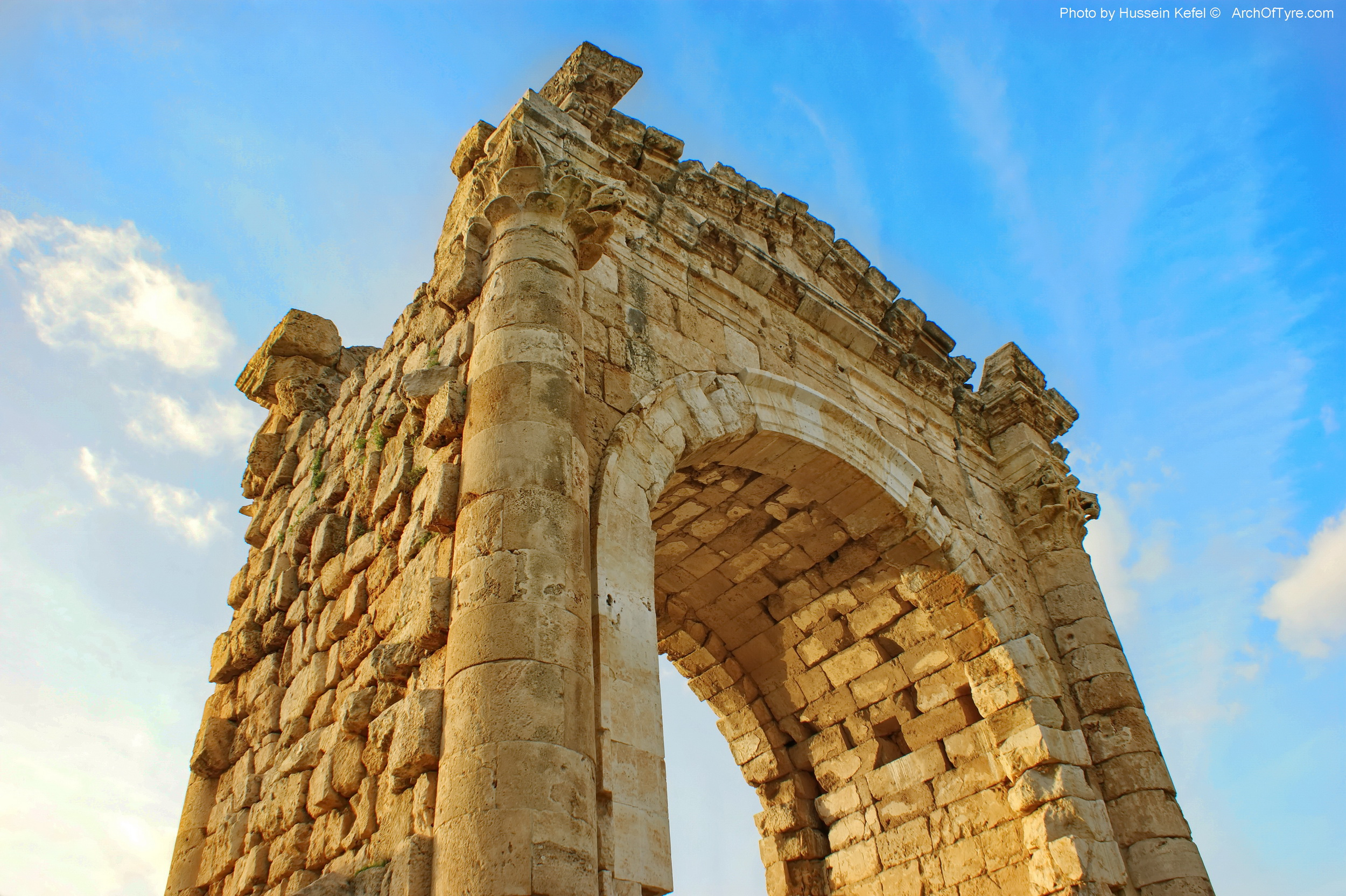

=== Hippodrome ===
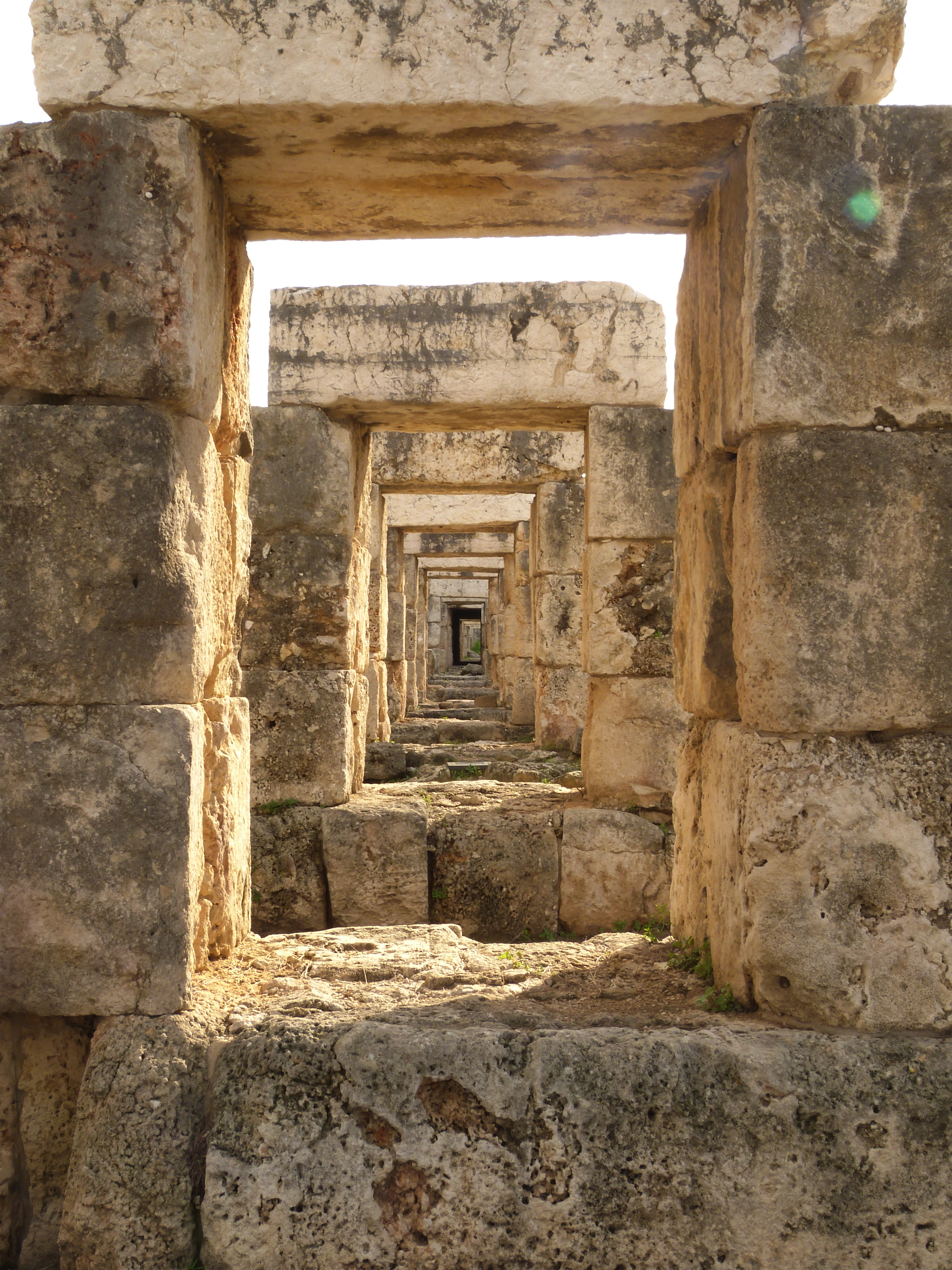

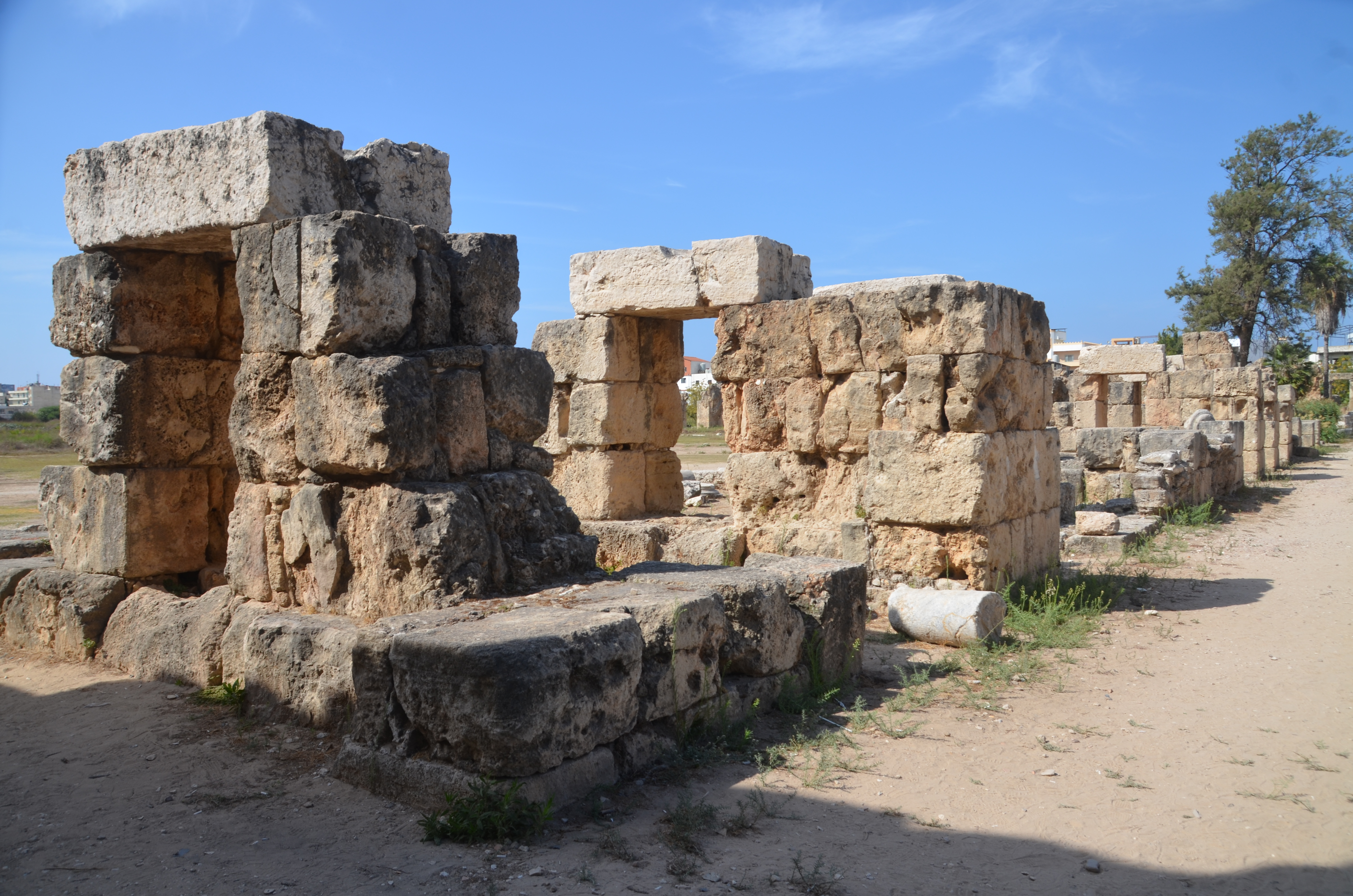

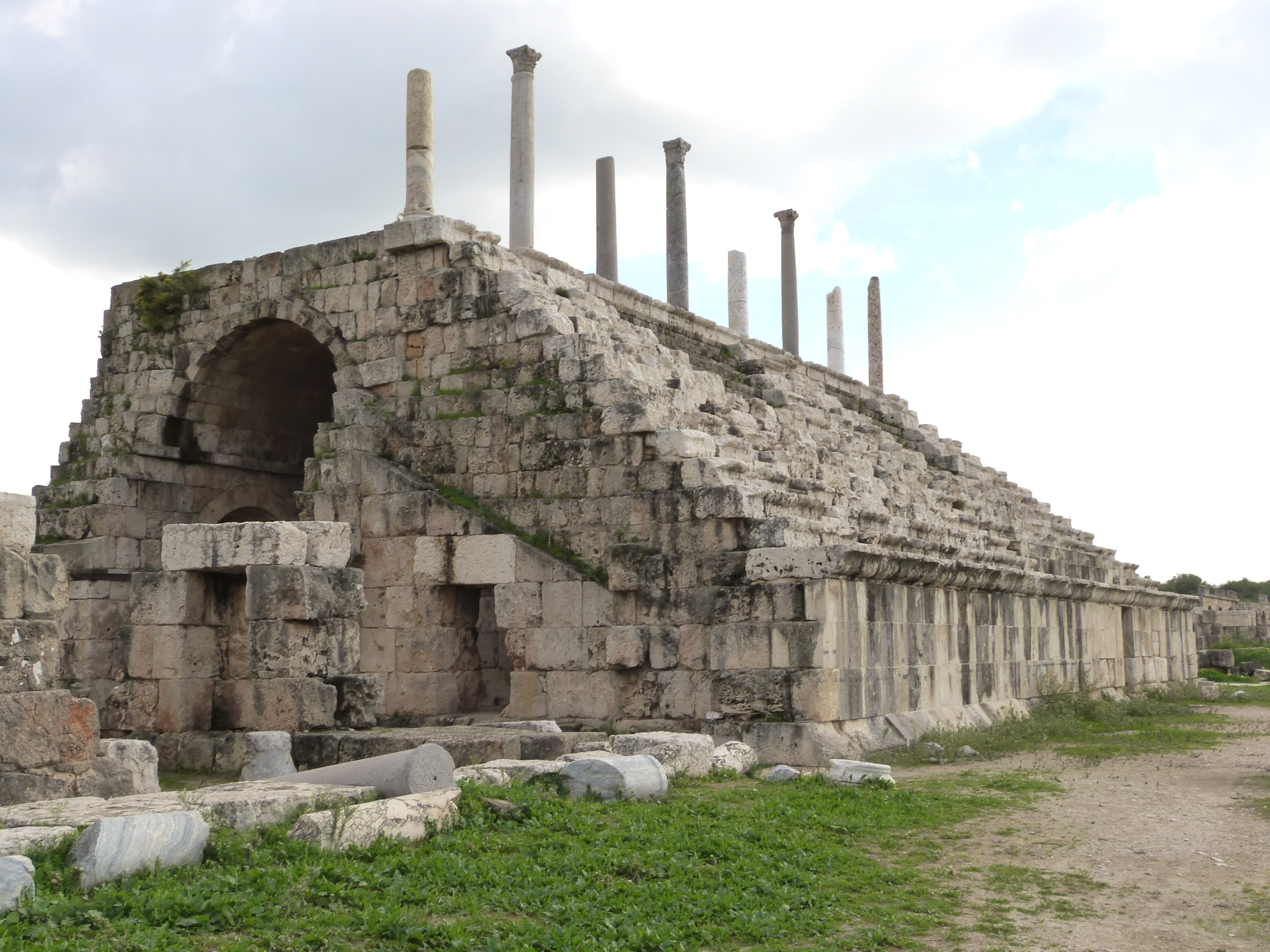

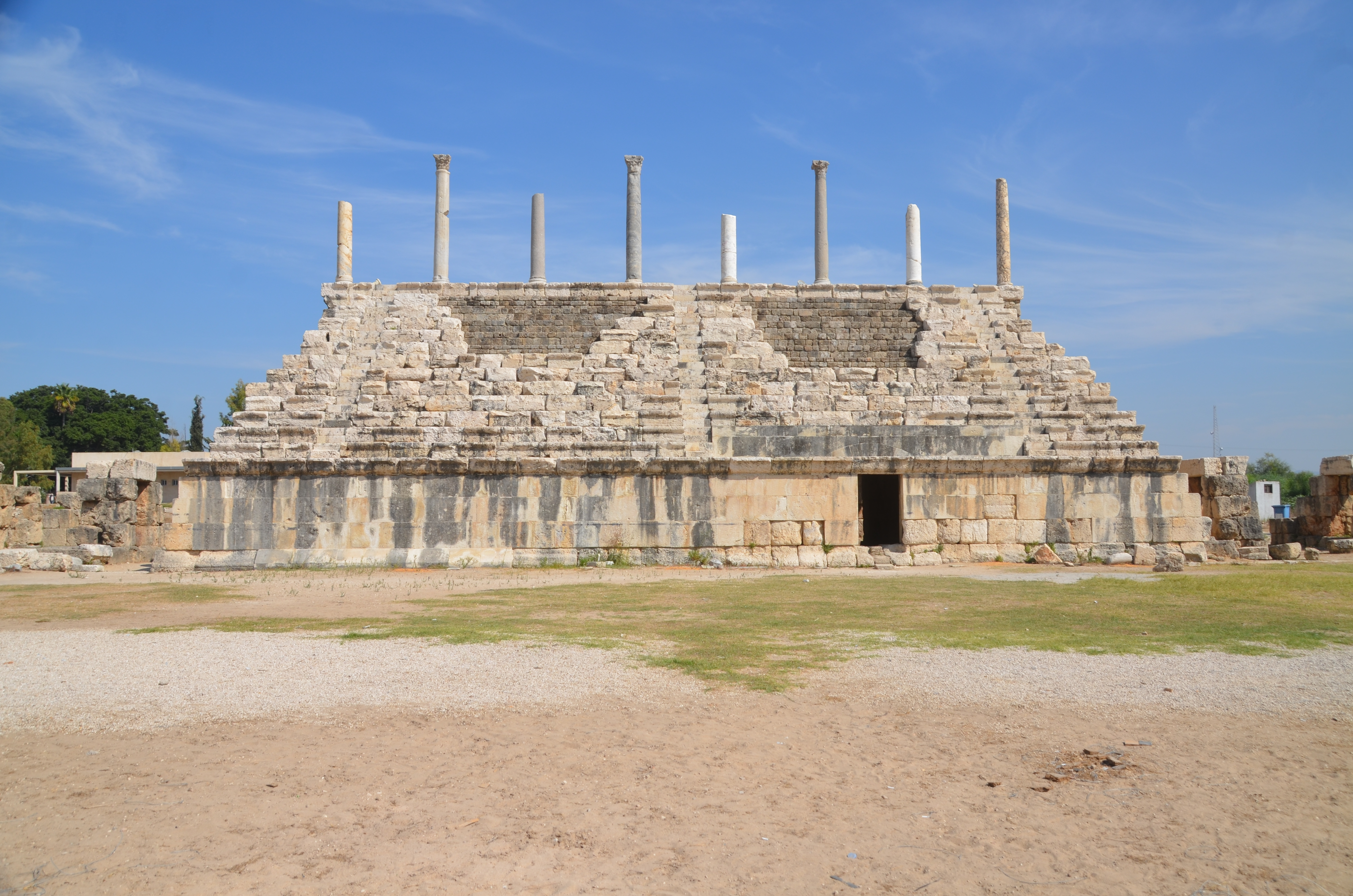

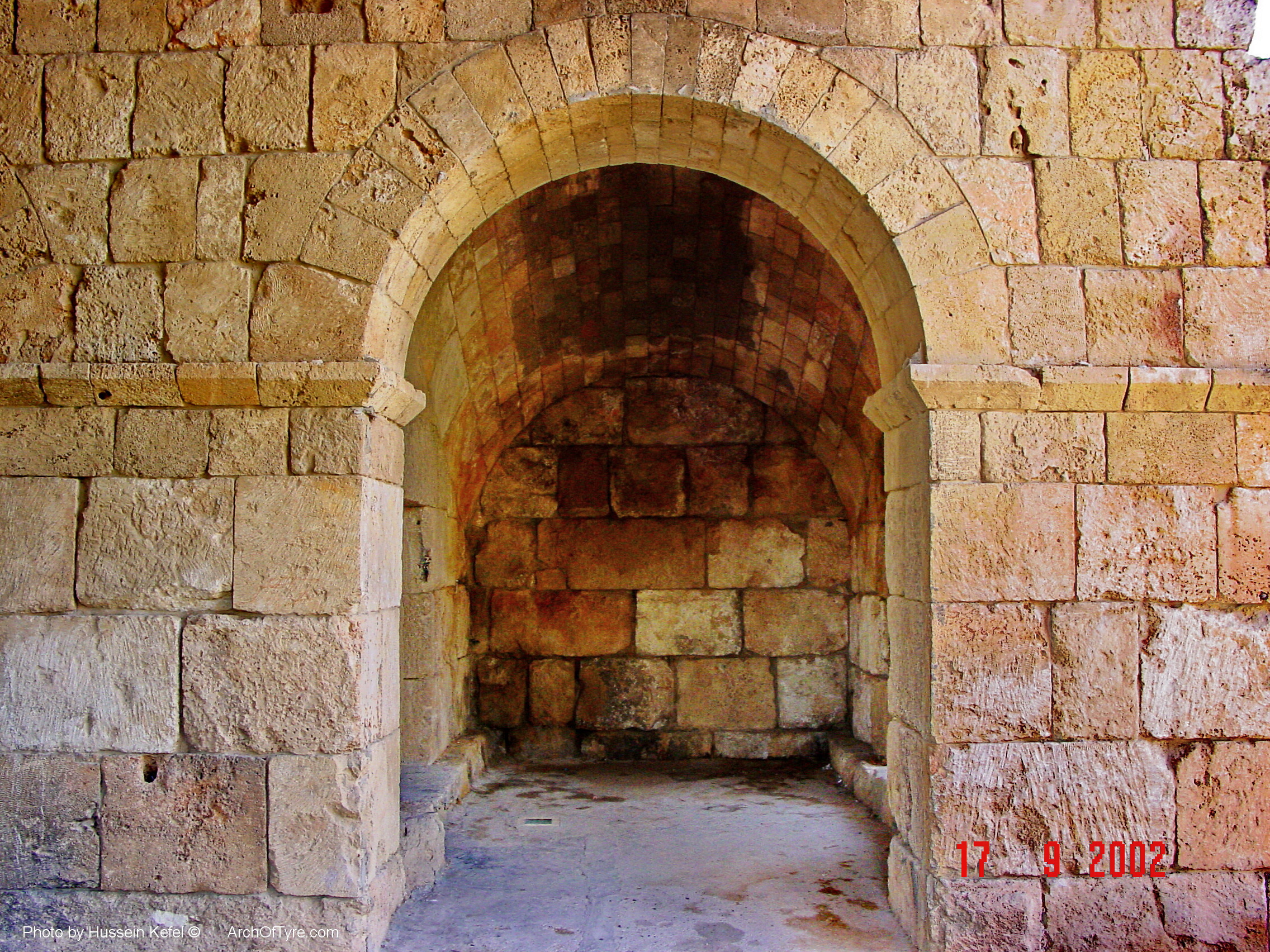

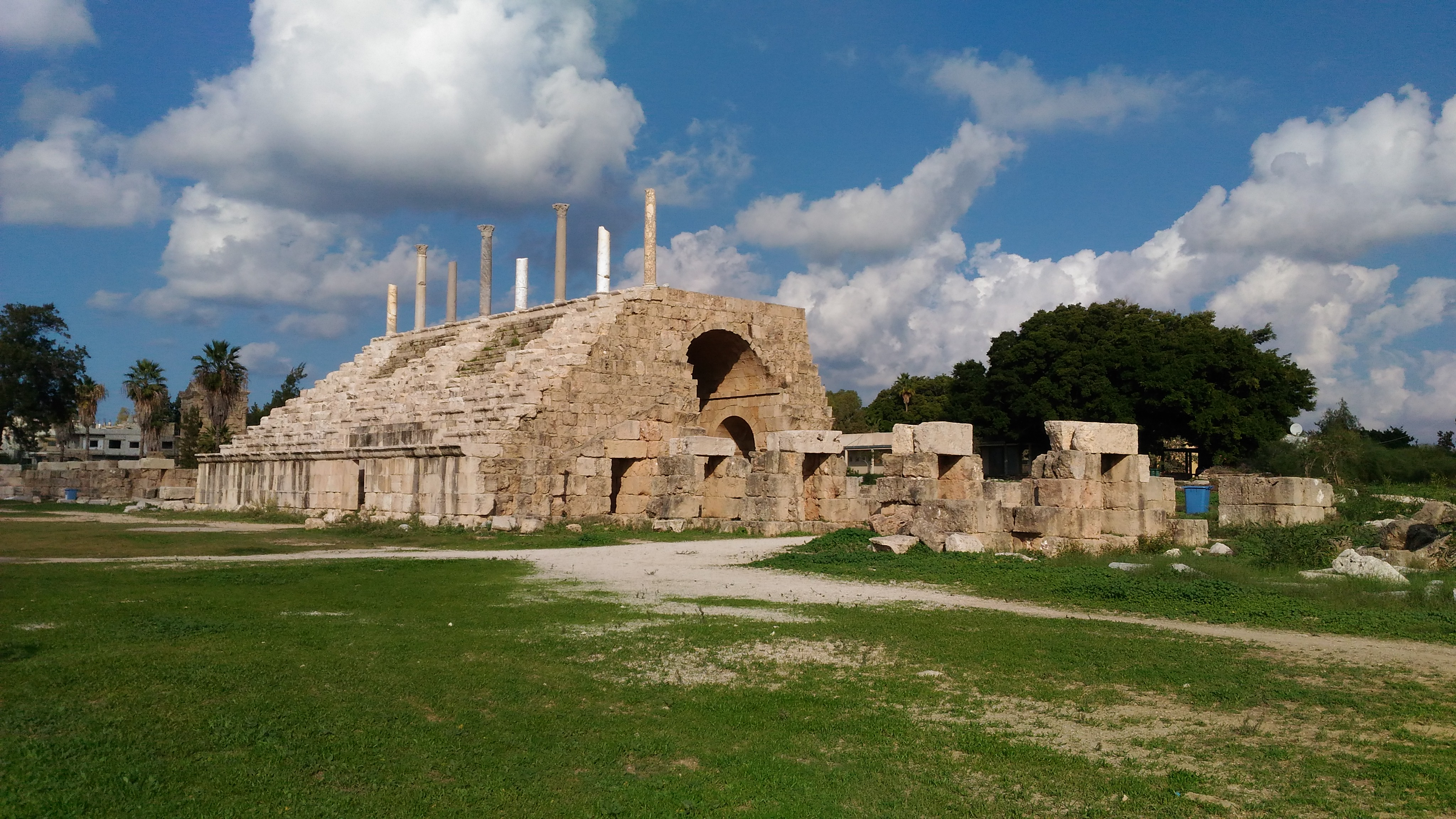

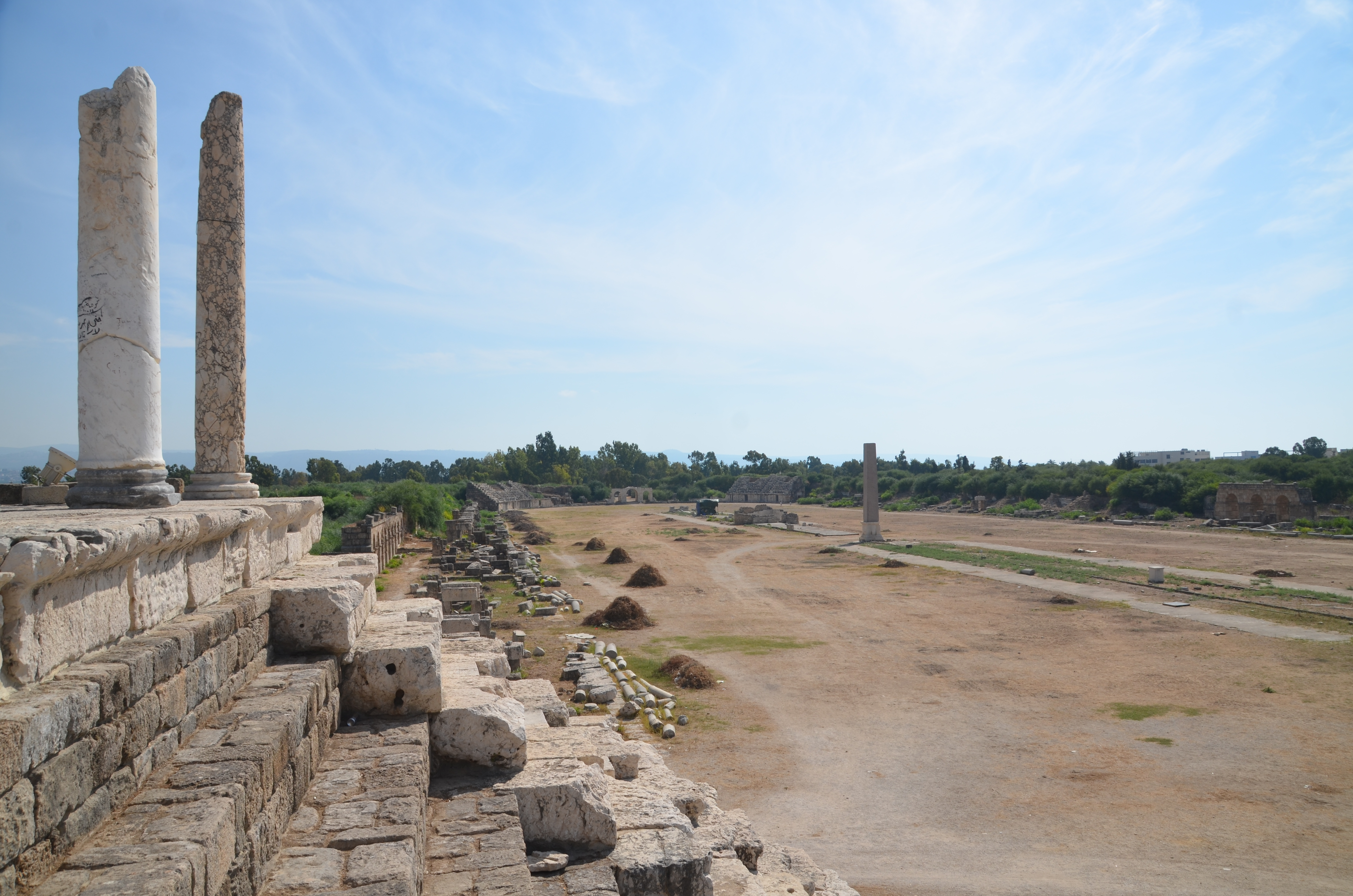

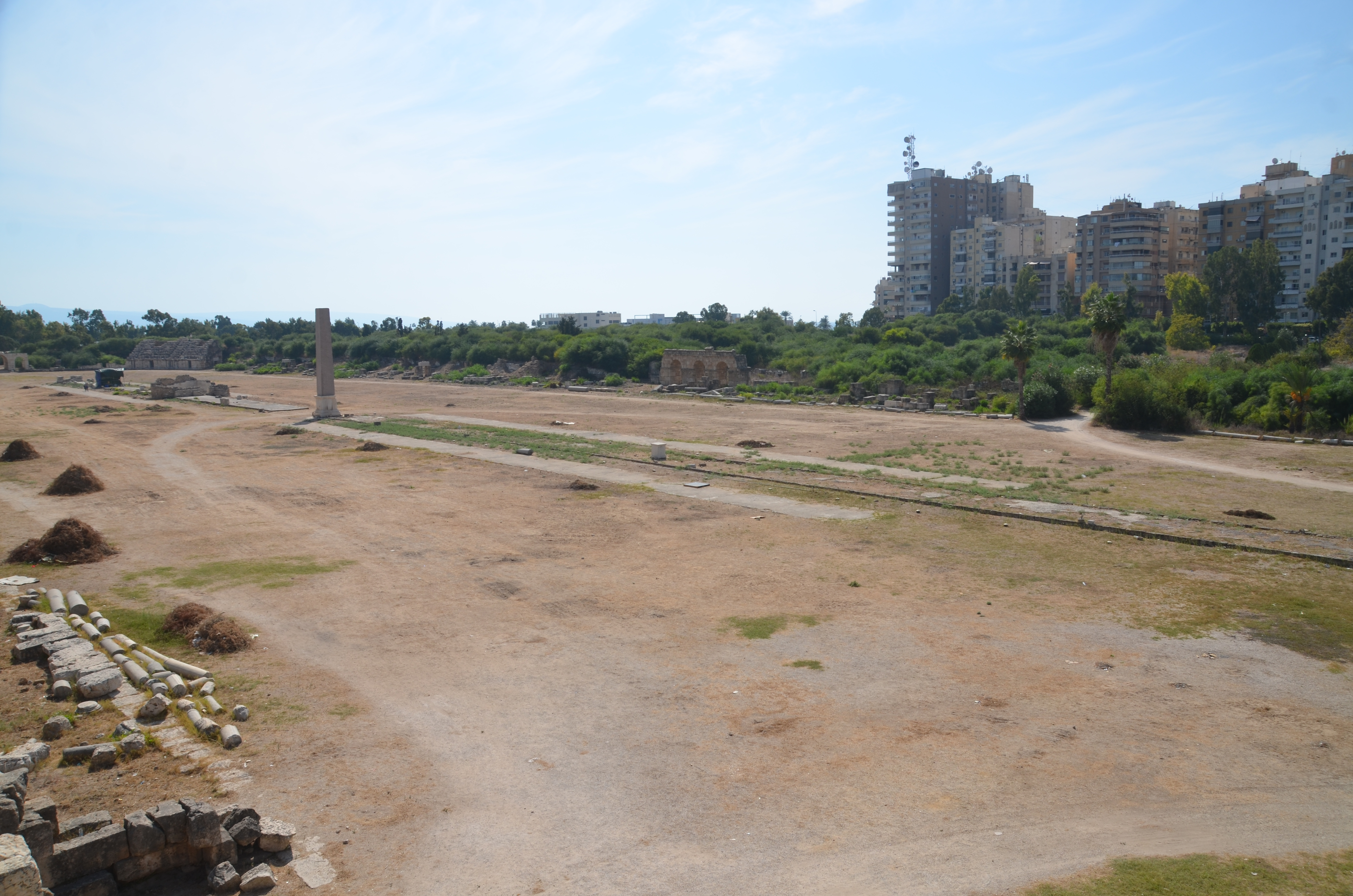
