= Collège Élite =

Collège Élite or Lycée Français International Elite may refer to one of two French international schools in Lebanon that are a part of the Association Franco-Libanaise pour l’Education et la Culture (AFLEC) network.

- Collège Élite (Beirut) including its branch campus in Bchamoun
- Collège Élite (Tyre)
