= Allaqa =

10th-century mariner and rebel in Lebanon

'Allāqa (died in 998), also known as al-'Allaqa, was a Tyrian sailor who led a revolt against the rule of the Fatimid Caliphate in Tyre, Lebanon.

== Revolt in Tyre ==
Instigated by 'Allāqa, the townspeople of Tyre killed the local representatives of the Fatimids in 996 or 997. He became popular in Tyre and coins were minted with his likeness.

== Under siege ==
Fatimid caliph Al-Hakim bi-Amr Allah responded by sending land and naval forces to lay siege to Tyre. Allaqa sought support from the Byzantine Emperor Basil II, promising to hand over the city if he emerged victorious; the emperor agreed and sent a squadron to support him. Most of the Byzantine vessels were captured by the Fatimids.

The Fatimids also diverted troops under the command of Jaysh ibn al-Samsama from their original mission to suppress another revolt in Damascus, to reinforce the siege.

== Defeat and death ==
On June 13, 998, the Fatimids conquered Tyre, despoiled the town, and killed many townspeople. The Arab historian Yahya of Antioch records that the Fatimids captured a Byzantine ship and its crew, which consisted of two hundred men, and killed them all.

Allaqa was captured and taken to Cairo with a large number of his followers, where they were flayed alive and then crucified.

== Bibliography ==
- Gil, Moshe (1997). A History of Palestine, 634-1099. Cambridge University Press. ISBN 978-0-521-59984-9.
- Lilie, R.-J.; Ludwig, C.; Pratsch, T.; Zielke, B. (2013). Prosopographie der mittelbyzantinischen Zeit Online. Berlin-Brandenburgische Akademie der Wissenschaften. Nach Vorarbeiten F. Winkelmanns erstellt (in German). Berlin and Boston: Walter de Gruyter. doi:10.1515/pmbz.
