= Tyre Hippodrome =

Roman racecourse in Tyre, Lebanon

- Location within Lebanon
- 33°16′20″N 35°12′35″E
- Location: Tyre, Lebanon

The Tyre Hippodrome, located in the city of Tyre in southern Lebanon, is an ancient sporting arena and UNESCO World Heritage site dating back to the second century AD. Built during the Roman era, the hippodrome was primarily used for chariot racing. It is considered the second-largest hippodrome in the ancient world.

The Expositio, a geographical account from the latter half of the fourth century by an anonymous author, lists the Tyre Hippodrome as one of the top five racetracks in the Levant during the Roman empire.

== Geography ==
The 480 meter long and 90 meter wide horseshoe-shaped structure seated twenty thousand spectators who gathered to watch the sport of chariot racing.

== Description ==
The place is considered to be one of the largest and best preserved Roman hippodromes of its type in the Roman world. Its seating section (cavea) is surmounting a gallery. The start boxes and parts of the median strip (spina) with an obelisk on it are visible. Each end of the course is marked by stone turning posts (metae). Charioteers had to make this circuit seven times.

== Tyrian Games ==
Although primarily meant for chariot races, the hippodrome was also used for other types of sport, and it is likely that at least some of the events of the Tyrian Games were celebrated at this place. It may have been the place where, during the Diocletianic Persecution, Christians were tortured to death.

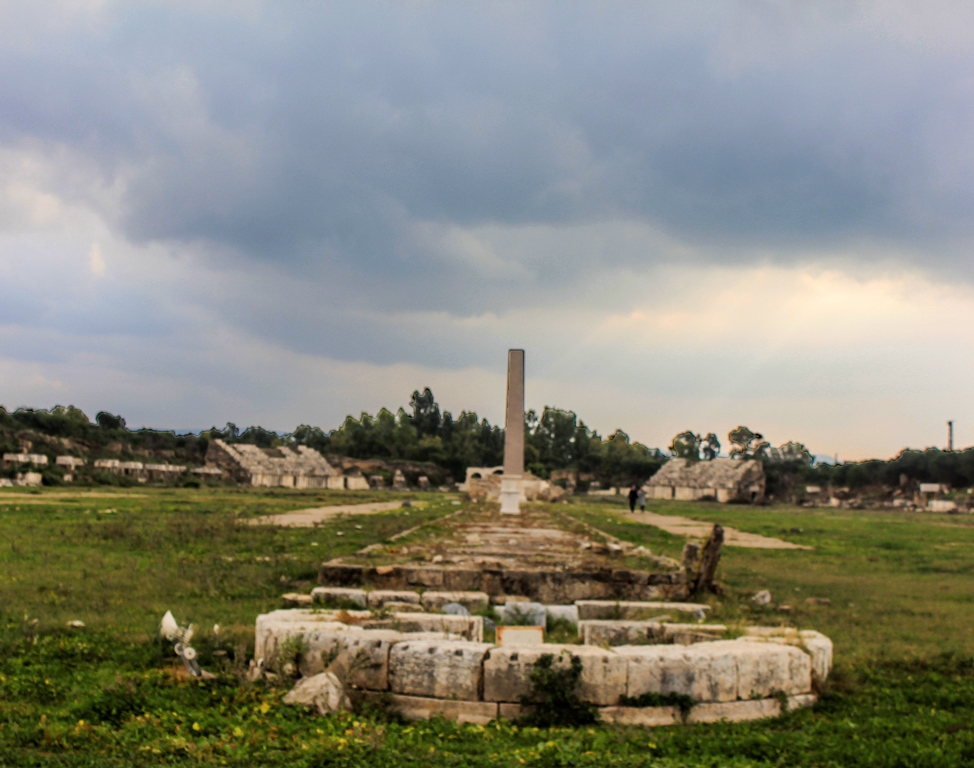
Turning post and median strip with obelisk

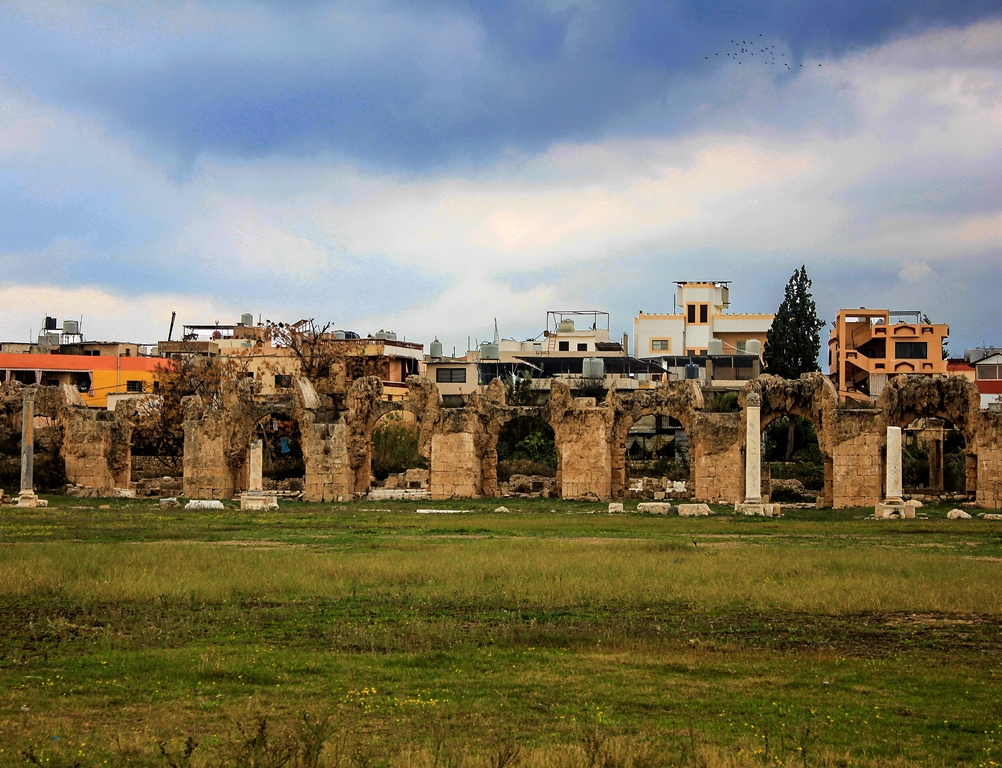
The start boxes

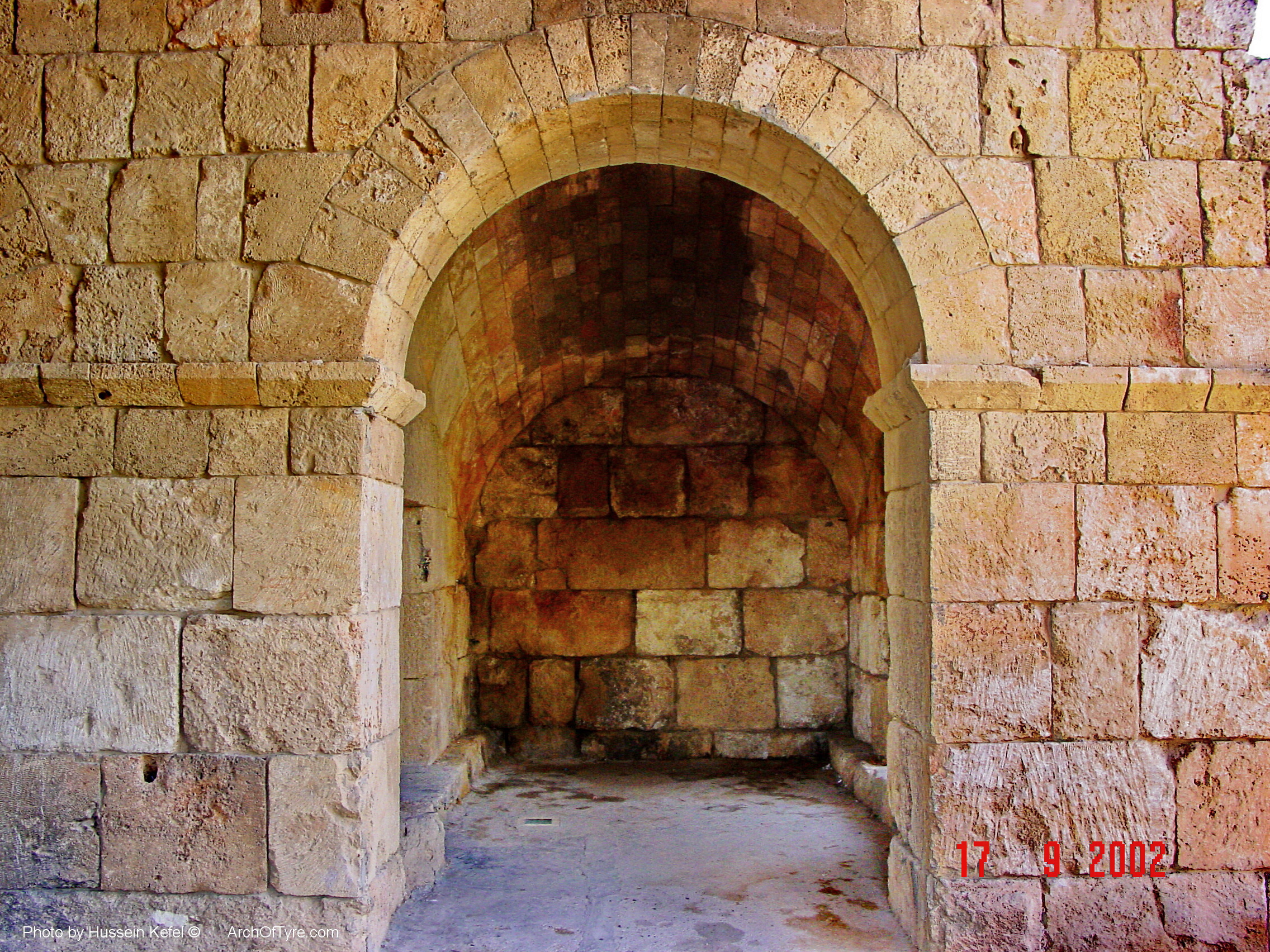
Arch below the hippodrome seats
