= Collège Élite (Tyre) =

Information
- Other names: Collège Franco-Libanais Elite; Lycée français international Elite - Tyr
- Established: 1996; 29 years ago
- Grades: toute petite section - terminale
- Affiliation: Association Franco-Libanaise pour l'Education et la Culture
- Website: lfietyr.aflec-fr.org

Collège Franco-Libanais Elite or Lycée français international Elite - Tyr is a French international school in Tyre, Lebanon. It is a part of the Association Franco-Libanaise pour l'Education et la Culture (AFLEC) network.

It serves levels toute petite section (fewer than three years) to terminale, the final year of lycée (senior high school/sixth form college).

It first opened in 1996. As of 2016 66.2% of the students were Lebanese, 16.2% of the students were French, and 17.6% of the students were of other nationalities.
