= Gaius Appuleius Diocles =

Roman charioteer

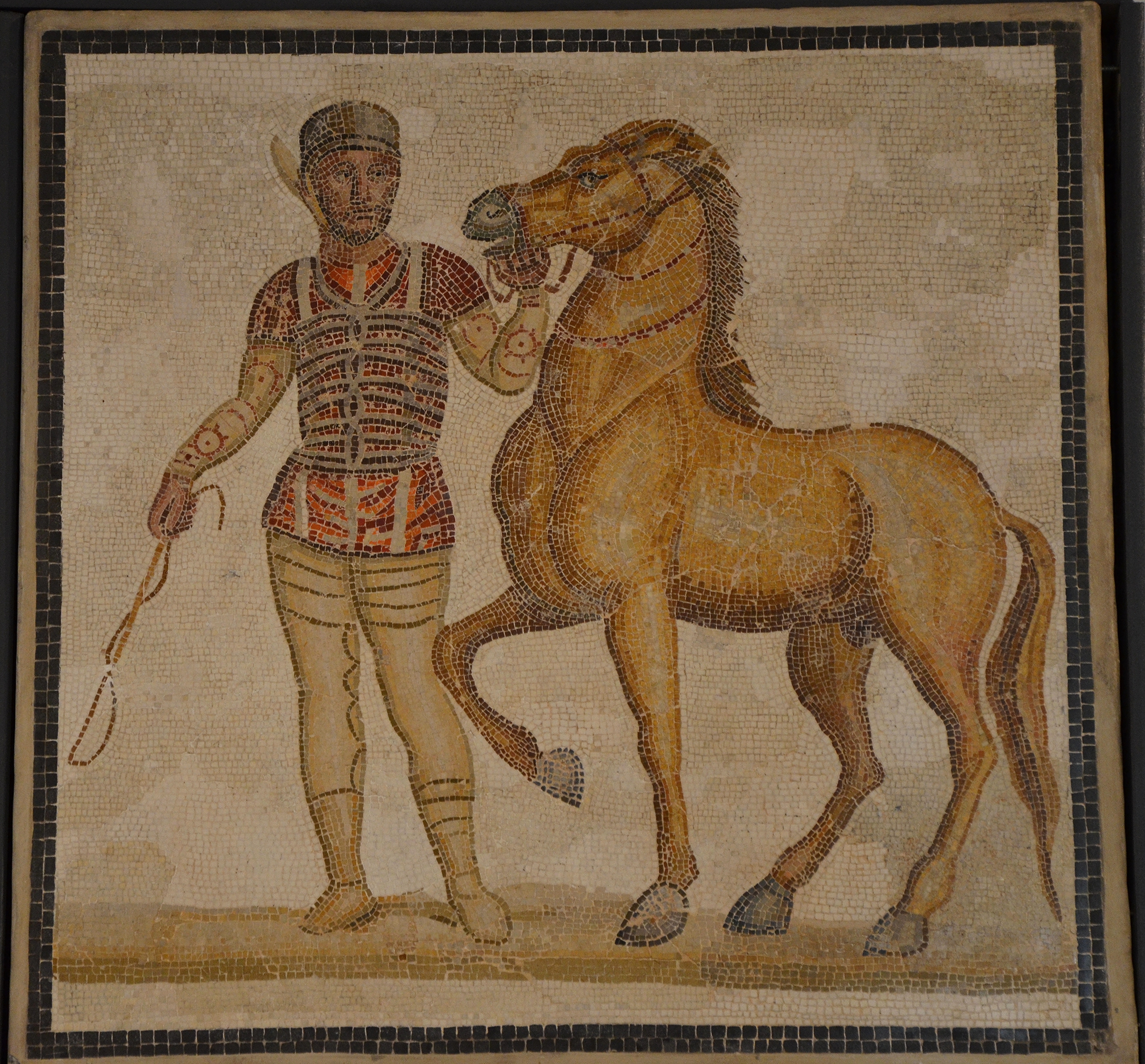
- Mosaic depicting a chariot racer from the Red team

Personal information
- Nationality: Roman
- Born: 104 AD Lusitania, Roman Empire (now Portugal and bordering parts of Western Spain)
- Died: after 146 AD (aged at least 41) Praeneste, Roman Empire (now Palestrina, Italy)

Horse racing career
- Sport: Horse racing
- Career winnings: 35,863,120 sesterces
- Career wins: first place in 1462 of 4257 quadriga team races; first place in 1064 quadriga singles races

Gaius Appuleius Diocles (104 – after 146 AD) was a Roman charioteer. His existence and career are attested by two highly detailed contemporary inscriptions, used by modern historians to help reconstruct the likely conduct and techniques of chariot racing. He has been described in some modern sources as the highest-paid athlete of all time.

== Early life and career in Rome ==
Gaius Appuleius Diocles was born in 104 AD in the Roman province of Lusitania, in the Western Iberian Peninsula. He made his racing debut in Rome at the age of 18, in 122 AD with the racing stable known as the Whites, but did not win a race until two years later.

Diocles usually raced four-horse chariots (quadrigae), probably at Rome's Circus Maximus. According to David Matz, the "great majority" of his wins were in the singles races, which may have been the most popular race-types both for drivers and spectators. Drivers competed for themselves, rather than their team, making a win the result of their individual talent and luck. Diocles had 1,064 wins as a single. An honorific inscription made in Rome during his lifetime (CIL VI, 10048 = ILS 5287) and another in Praeneste after his retirement there (CIL XIV, 2884) are the sole records of his existence and career. They show that in his 24 years of racing, he won 1,462 of his 4,257 four-horse races as member of a team, and was placed in 1,438 more (mostly in second place). He broke several records. He won the most prestigious race, held immediately after the ceremonial opening procession (Pompa circensis), 110 times. He won 815 times by leading from the starting gate; one of his strategies involved his hanging back until the last minute, then pulling ahead of the competition for a clear win. His publicity and very detailed track record remain an essential source for reconstruction of the conduct and techniques of Roman chariot racing.

Diocles raced for 24 years and represented three of the four most famous chariot racing stables (factiones) in Rome, which were known by their racing colours (Reds, Whites, Blues, and Greens). He began with the Whites at the age of 18; after six years, he switched to the Greens, during which time he sustained some kind of injury on the race-track. Diocles' track record with the Greens was poor. David Metz suggests that Diocles might have somehow offended the Green team management, who punished him by restricting his opportunities, denying him the use of their best horses. He left the Greens after only 3 years and raced 15 years for the Reds before retiring to the small but opulent town of Praeneste at the age of 42. He is assumed to have died in or soon after 146, following what McManus describes as an "unusually long" career.

=== Winnings ===
Diocles' lifetime winnings, as recorded in Roman inscription CIL 6.10048, totalled 35,863,120 sesterces (HS) over a working life of 24 years. From this, he would have been paid an unknown sum by his management team, or his owners; his status as slave or free is uncertain, as is the likely amount of his total share. Whereas slave-charioteers could not lawfully own property, their owners would have kept prize moneys on their behalf, against their future manumission as clients of their former master. Drivers were paid a basic driving fee regardless of their social class, their placing, or their completion of the race. Prizes were variable; up to 60,000 was distributed among the winning team or their sponsors. Vamplew calculates that even if Diocles' personal winnings had been only a tenth part of the prize money, this would have yielded him an average annual income of 150,000 HS during his career, excluding his driving fees: a great deal more than any other racing competitors known to history. Golden believes that Diocles' winnings would have been thought "significant" in Rome.

=== Status ===
The races were discreetly organised, financed, and managed "behind the scenes", usually by members of the equestrian order on behalf of wealthy patrons and investors. Diocles was a "public hero", an exemplar of what Sinclair Bell describes as Rome's "performance culture", but was at best a low-class citizen, possibly a slave in his early career, or if manumitted, a freedman with continued duties to his patron. His earnings would have been more than enough to qualify him for membership of the equestrian or senatorial orders, but his profession excluded him from both, as someone socially and morally tainted or "infamous". For a member of the upper classes, openly competing for money was disgraceful in itself, and driving one's own chariot was an indignity. Making a living as a chariot driver would have excluded any citizen from many of the privileges and protections of full citizenship, and from holding any public office. Others in this category included actors, prostitutes, auctioneers, gladiators, butchers, and funeral directors. Two jurists of the later Imperial era argue against the "infamous" status of charioteers, on the grounds that athletic competitions are not mere entertainment but "seem useful", as displays of Roman strength and virtus.

== See also ==
- Porphyrius the Charioteer (Byzantium)
