= Chariot racing =

Ancient Greek, Roman, and Byzantine sport

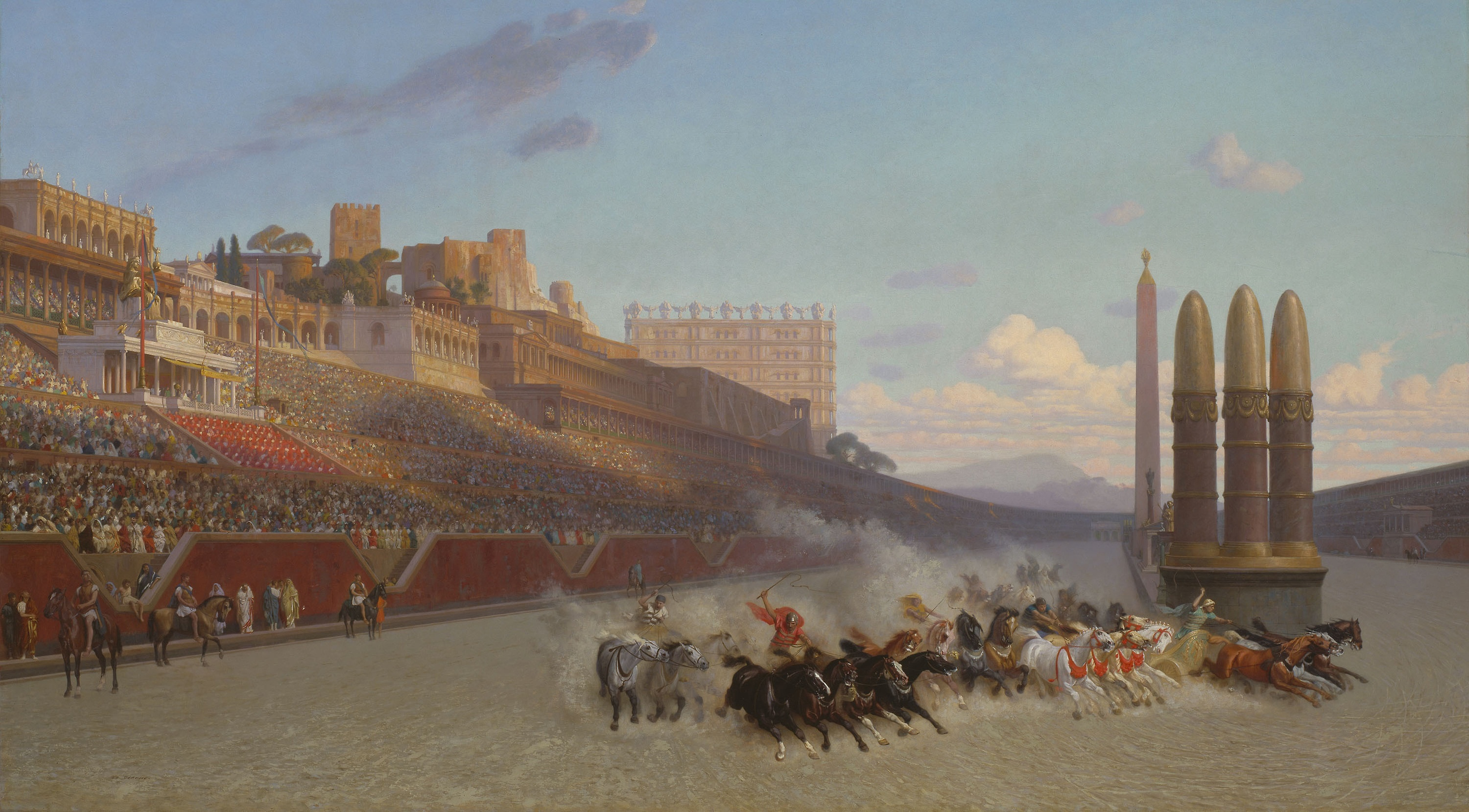
Modern depiction (1876) by Jean Léon Gérôme of a chariot race in Rome's Circus Maximus, as if seen from the starting gate. The Palatine Hill and imperial palace are to the left.

Chariot racing (Ancient Greek: ἁρματοδρομία, harmatodromía; Latin: ludi circenses) was one of the most popular ancient Greek, Roman, and Byzantine sports. In Greece, chariot racing played an essential role in aristocratic funeral games from a very early time. With the institution of formal races and permanent racetracks, chariot racing was adopted by many Greek states and their religious festivals. Horses and chariots were very costly. Their ownership was a preserve of the wealthiest aristocrats, whose reputations and status benefitted from offering such extravagant, exciting displays. Their successes could be further broadcast and celebrated through commissioned odes and other poetry.

In standard Greek racing practise, each chariot held a single driver and was pulled by four horses, or sometimes two. Drivers and horses risked serious injury or death through collisions and crashes; this added to the excitement and interest for spectators. Most charioteers were slaves or contracted professionals. While records almost invariably credit victorious owners and their horses for winning, their drivers are often not mentioned at all. In the ancient Olympic Games, and other Panhellenic Games, chariot racing was one of the most important equestrian events, and could be watched by unmarried women. Married women were banned from watching any Olympic events but a Spartan noblewoman is known to have trained horse-teams for the Olympics and won two races, one of them as driver.

In ancient Rome, chariot racing was the most popular of many subsidised public entertainments, and was an essential component in several religious festivals. Roman chariot drivers had very low social status, but were paid a fee simply for taking part. Winners were celebrated and well paid for their victories, regardless of status, and the best could earn more than the wealthiest lawyers and senators. Racing team managers may have competed for the services of particularly skilled drivers and their horses. The drivers could race as individuals, or under team colours: Blue, Green, Red or White. Spectators generally chose to support a single team, and identify themselves with its fortunes. Private betting on the races raised large sums for the teams, drivers and wealthy backers. Generous imperial subsidies of "bread and circuses" kept the Roman masses fed, entertained and distracted. Organised violence between rival racing factions was not uncommon, but it was generally contained. Roman and later Byzantine emperors, mistrustful of private organisations as potentially subversive, took control of the teams, especially the Blues and Greens, and appointed officials to manage them.

Chariot racing faded in importance in the Western Roman Empire after the fall of Rome; the last known race there was staged in the Circus Maximus in 549, by the Ostrogothic king, Totila. In the Eastern Roman (Byzantine) Empire, the traditional Roman chariot-racing factions continued to play a prominent role in mass entertainment, religion and politics for several centuries. Supporters of the Blue teams vied with supporters of the Greens for control of foreign, domestic and religious policies, and imperial subsidies for themselves. Their displays of civil discontent and disobedience culminated in an indiscriminate slaughter of Byzantine citizenry by the military in the Nika riots. Thereafter, rising costs and a failing economy saw the gradual decline of Byzantine chariot racing.

== Early Greece ==
Images on pottery show that chariot racing existed in thirteenth century BC Mycenaean Greece. (Note: A number of fragments of pottery show two or more chariots, obviously in the middle of a race. Bennett asserts that this is a clear indication that chariot racing existed as a sport from as early as the thirteenth century BC. Chariot races are also depicted on late Geometric vases.) The first literary reference to a chariot race is in Homer's poetic account of the funeral games for Patroclus, in the Iliad, combining practices from the author's own time (c. 8th century) with accounts based on a legendary past. The participants in this race were drawn from leading figures among the Greeks; Diomedes of Argos, the poet Eumelus, the Achaean prince Antilochus, King Menelaus of Sparta, and the hero Meriones. The race, which was one lap around the stump of a tree, was won by Diomedes, who received a slave woman and a cauldron as his prize. A chariot race also was said to be the event that founded the Olympic Games; according to one legend, mentioned by Pindar, King Oenomaus challenged suitors for his daughter Hippodamia to a race, but was defeated by Pelops, who founded the Games in honour of his victory.

== Olympic Games ==
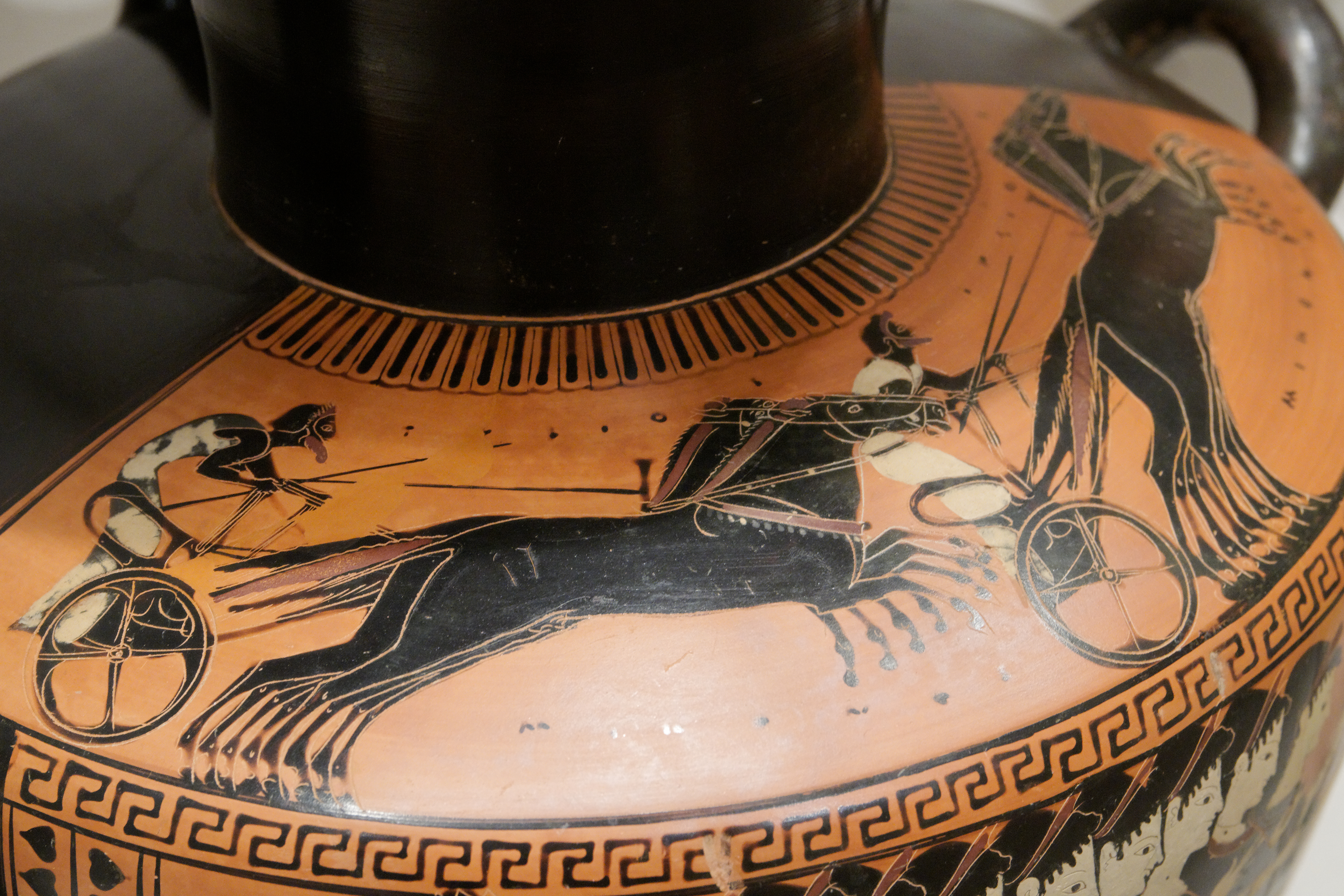
Chariot racing on a black-figure hydria from Attica, ca. 510 BC

The Olympic Games were traditionally founded in 776 BC, by the Eleans, a wealthy, prestigious horse-owning aristocracy. Pindar, the earliest source for the Olympics, includes chariot racing among their five foundation events. Much later, Pausanias claims that chariot races were added only from 680 BC, and that the games were extended from one day to two days to accommodate them. In this tradition, the foot race of a stadion (approximately 600 feet) offered the greater prestige. Votive offerings associated with Olympic victories include horses and chariots. The single horse race (the keles) was a late arrival at the games, dropped early in their history. The major chariot-races of the Olympic and other Panhellenic Games, were four-horse (tethrippon, τέθριππον) and two-horse (synoris, συνωρὶς) events. (Note: The races differed only in the number of horses used. Synoris succeeded tethrippon in 384 BC. Tethrippon was reintroduced in 268 BC.)

Pausanias describes the Olympic hippodrome of the second century AD, when Greece was part of the Roman Empire. (Note: The remains of the hippodrome lie under several metres depth of unexcavated alluvium but its presence and orientation are confirmed by radar.) The perimeter groundplan, southeast of the sanctuary itself, was approximately 780 meters long and 320 meters wide. (Note: Pausanias gives this as four stadia long and one stade four plethra wide) Competitors raced from the starting-place counter-clockwise around the nearest (western) turning post, then turned at the eastern turning post and headed back west. The number of circuits varied according to the event. Spectators could watch from natural embankments to the north, and artificial embankments to the south and east. A place on the western side of the north bank was reserved for the judges. Pausanias does not describe a central dividing barrier at Olympia, but archaeologist Vikatou presumes one.

Pausanias offers several theories regarding the origins of an object named Taraxippus ("Horse-disturber"), an ancient round altar, tomb or Heroon embedded within one of the entrance-ways to the track. It was thought to be malevolent, as it terrified horses for no apparent reason when they raced past it, and was a major cause of crashes. Pausanias reports that consequently "the charioteers offer sacrifice, and pray that Taraxippus may show himself propitious". It might simply have marked the most dangerous and difficult section of track, at the semi-circular end. Pausanias describes very similar, identically named places in other Greek hippodromes. Their name may have been an epithet of Poseidon, patron deity of horses and horse-racing. (Note: Little is known of the construction of Greek hippodromes before the Roman period.)

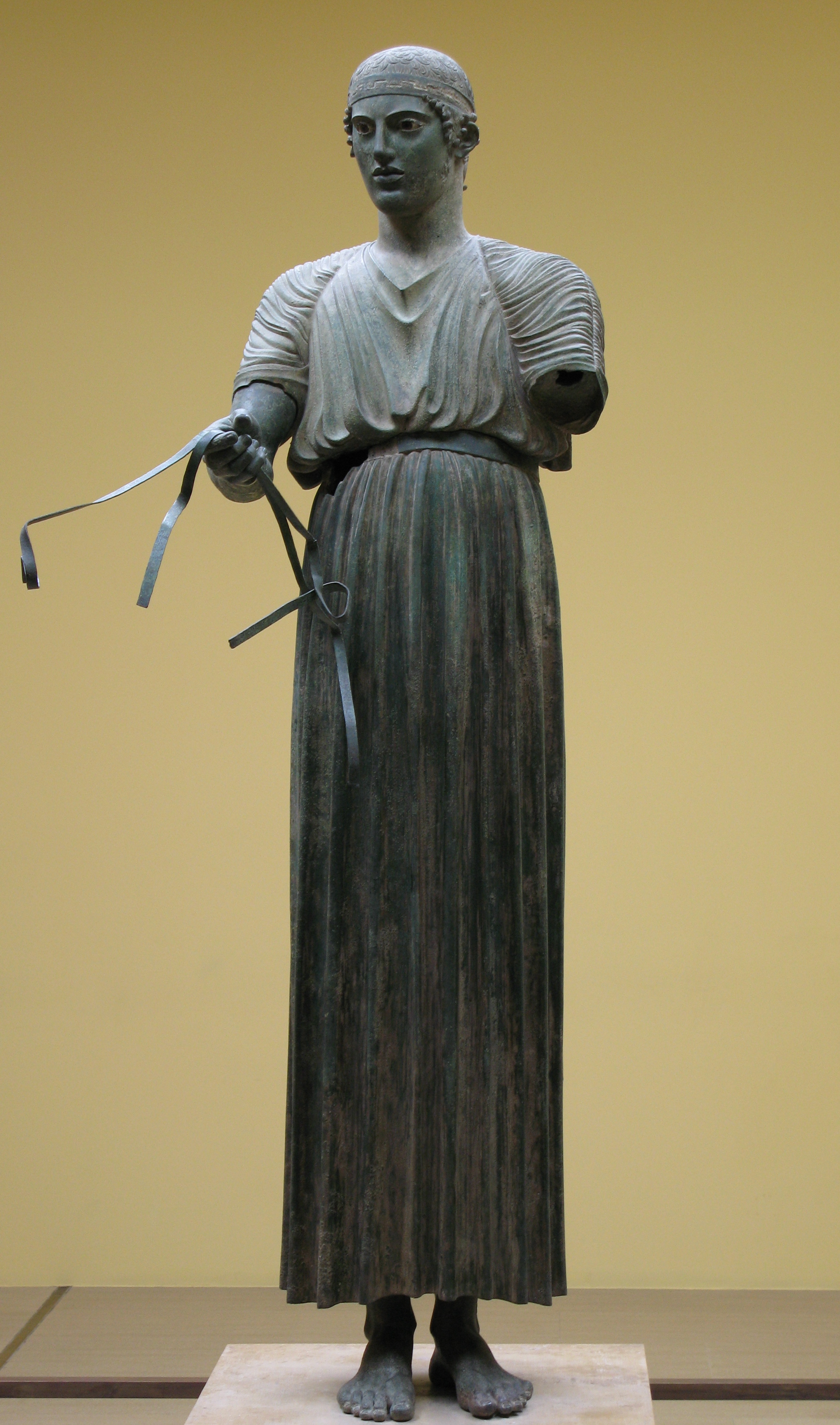
The Charioteer of Delphi, an anonymous charioteer who probably drove in the Pythian Games for Polyzalus, tyrant of Gela, in Sicily (480–470BC)

Races began with a procession into the hippodrome, while a herald announced the names of the drivers and owners. The tethrippon consisted of twelve laps. The most immediate and challenging aspect of the races for drivers, judges and stewards was ensuring a fair start, and keeping false starts and crushes to a minimum. Then as now, the marshalling of over-excited racehorses could prove a major difficulty. Various mechanical devices were used to reduce the likelihood of human error. Portable starting gates (hyspleges, singular: hysplex), employed a tight cord in a wooden frame, loosened to drop forwards and start the race. According to Pausanias, the chariot furthest from the start-line began to move, followed by the rest in sequence, so that when the final gate was opened, all the chariots would be in motion at the starting line. A bronze eagle (a sign of Zeus, who was patron of the Olympic games) was raised to start the race, and at each lap, a bronze dolphin (a sign of Poseidon) was lowered. (Note: Some of the problems in Pausanias's account, and the likely problems involved in fair starts, are discussed in Harris (1968).) The central pair of horses did most of the heavy pulling, via the yoke. The flanking pair pulled and guided, using their traces. Horse teams were highly trained, and tractable. Greek aficionadoes thought mares the best horses for chariot racing.

=== Owners and charioteers ===
In most cases, the owner and the driver of the Greek racing chariot were different persons. In 416 BC, the Athenian general Alcibiades had seven chariots in the race, and came in first, second, and fourth; evidently, he could not have been racing all seven chariots himself. Chariot teams were costly to own and train, and the case of Alcibiades shows that for the wealthy, this was an effective and honourable form of self-publicity; they were not expected to risk their own lives. On the other hand, they were not necessarily dishonoured when they did. The poet Pindar praised Herodotes for driving his own chariot, "using his own hands rather than another's".

Entries were exclusively Greek, or claimed to be so. Philip II of Macedon, pre-eminent through his conquest of most Greek states and self-promotion as a divinity, entered his horse and chariot teams in several major pan-Hellenic events, and won several. He celebrated the fact on his coinage, claiming it as divine confirmation of his legitimacy as Greek overlord.

Women could win races through ownership, though there was a ban on the participation of married women as competitors or even spectators at the Olympics, supposedly on pain of death; this was not typical of Greek festivals in general, and there is no consistent record of this ban, or the penalty's enforcement. The Spartan Cynisca, daughter of Archidamus II, twice entered and won the Olympic chariot race as owner and trainer.

Most charioteers were slaves or hired professionals. Drivers and their horses needed strength, skill, courage, endurance and prolonged, intensive training. Like jockeys, charioteers were ideally slight of build, and therefore often young, but unlike jockeys, they were also tall. The names of very few charioteers are known from the Greek racing circuits, (Note: One of them is Carrhotus who is praised by Pindar for keeping his chariot unscathed. Carrhotus's chariot was owned by his friend and brother-in-law Arcesilaus of Cyrene; his win could be claimed as evidence that the traditional aristocratic organisation of Greek society was also a success.) Victory songs, epigrams and other monuments routinely omit the names of winning drivers.

The chariots themselves resembled war chariots, essentially wooden two-wheeled carts with an open back, though by this time chariots were no longer used in battle. Charioteers stood throughout the race. They traditionally wore only a sleeved garment called a xystis, which would have offered at least some protection from crashes and dust. It fell to the ankles and was fastened high at the waist with a plain belt. Two straps that crossed high at the upper back prevented the xystis from "ballooning" during the race The body of the chariot rested on the axle, so the ride was bumpy. The most exciting parts of the chariot race, at least for the spectators, were the turns at the ends of the hippodrome. These turns were dangerous and sometimes deadly. In a full-sized racing stadium, the chariots could reach high speeds along the straights, then overturn or be crushed along with their horses and driver by the following chariots as they wheeled around the post. Driving into an opponent to make him crash was technically illegal, but most crashes were accidental and often unavoidable. In Homer's account of Patroclus's funeral games, Antilochus inflicts such a crash on Menelaus.

=== Pan-Hellenic festivals ===
Race winners were celebrated throughout the Greek festival circuit, both on their own account and on behalf of their cities. In the classical era, other great festivals emerged in Asia Minor, Magna Graecia, and the mainland, providing the opportunity for cities to compete for honour and renown, and for their athletes to gain fame and riches. Apart from the Olympics, the most notable were the Isthmian Games in Corinth, the Nemean Games, the Pythian Games in Delphi, and the Panathenaic Games in Athens, where the winner of the four-horse chariot race was awarded 140 amphorae of olive oil, a highly valued commodity. Prizes elsewhere included corn in Eleusis, bronze shields in Argos, and silver vessels in Marathon. Winning Greek athletes, no matter their social status, were greatly honoured by their own communities. (Note: The returning athletes also gained various benefits in their native towns and cities, such as tax exemptions, free clothing and meals, and prize money.) Chariot racing at the Panathenaic Games included a two-man event, the apobatai, in which one of the team was armoured, and periodically leapt off the moving chariot, ran alongside it, then leapt back on again. The second charioteer took the reins when the apobates jumped out; in the catalogues of winners, the names of both these athletes are given. Images of this contest show warriors, armed with helmets and shields, perched on the back of their racing chariots. Some scholars believe that the event preserved traditions of Homeric warfare.

== Roman chariot racing ==
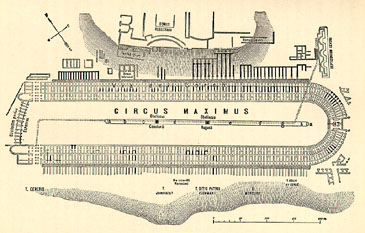
A plan of the Circus Maximus. The starting gates are to the left, and a conjectured start-line cuts across the track, to the right of the nearest meta.

The Romans probably borrowed chariot technology and racing track design from the Etruscans, who in turn had borrowed them from the Greeks. Rome's public entertainments were also influenced directly by Greek examples. (Note: In Rome, chariot racing constituted one of the two types of public games, the ludi circenses. The other type, ludi scaenici, consisted chiefly of theatrical performances, whether tragedies with a moral lesson, or homegrown popular comedies.) Chariot racing as a feature of Roman ludi is attested in Rome's foundation myths, and on 66 of the 177 days of religious festival games scheduled in a late Roman Calendar of 354. Races were held as part of triumphal processions, foundation anniversary rites and funeral games subsidised by magnates during the Regal and Republican eras, and by the emperors during the imperial era. According to Roman legend, Rome in its earliest days was faced with a lack of marriagable women. Romulus, the city's founder, invited the Sabine people to celebrate the Consualia, honouring the grain-god Consus with horse races and chariot races at the Circus Maximus. While the Sabines were enjoying the spectacle, Romulus and his men seized the Sabine women. The women eventually married their captors, and were instrumental in persuading Sabines and Romans to unite as one people. Chariot racing thus played a part in Rome's foundation myth and local politics.

Consuls were obliged to subsidise races at the beginning and end of their annual terms, as a sort of tax on their office and a gift to the people of Rome. Races on January 1 accompanied the renewal of loyalty vows; emperors gave annual games on the anniversary of their succession, and on their own and other imperial birthdays.

Chariot races were preceded by a parade (pompa circensis) that featured the charioteers, music, costumed dancers, and gilded images of the gods, headed by Victoria, goddess of victory. These images were placed on dining couches, which were arranged on a viewing platform (pulvinar) to observe the races, which were nominally held in their honour. The sponsor or editor of the races shared the pulvinar with these divine images. In the imperial era, the pulvinar in the Circus Maximus was directly connected to the imperial palace, on the Palatine Hill.

Several deities had permanent temples, shrines or images on the dividing barrier (spina or euripus) of the circus. While the entertainment value of chariot races tended to overshadow any sacred purpose, in late antiquity the Church Fathers still saw them as a traditional "pagan" practice and advised Christians not to participate. Soon after the end of the Roman Empire in the West, the influential Christian scholar, administrator and historian Cassiodorus describes chariot racing as an instrument of the Devil.

=== Roman circuses ===
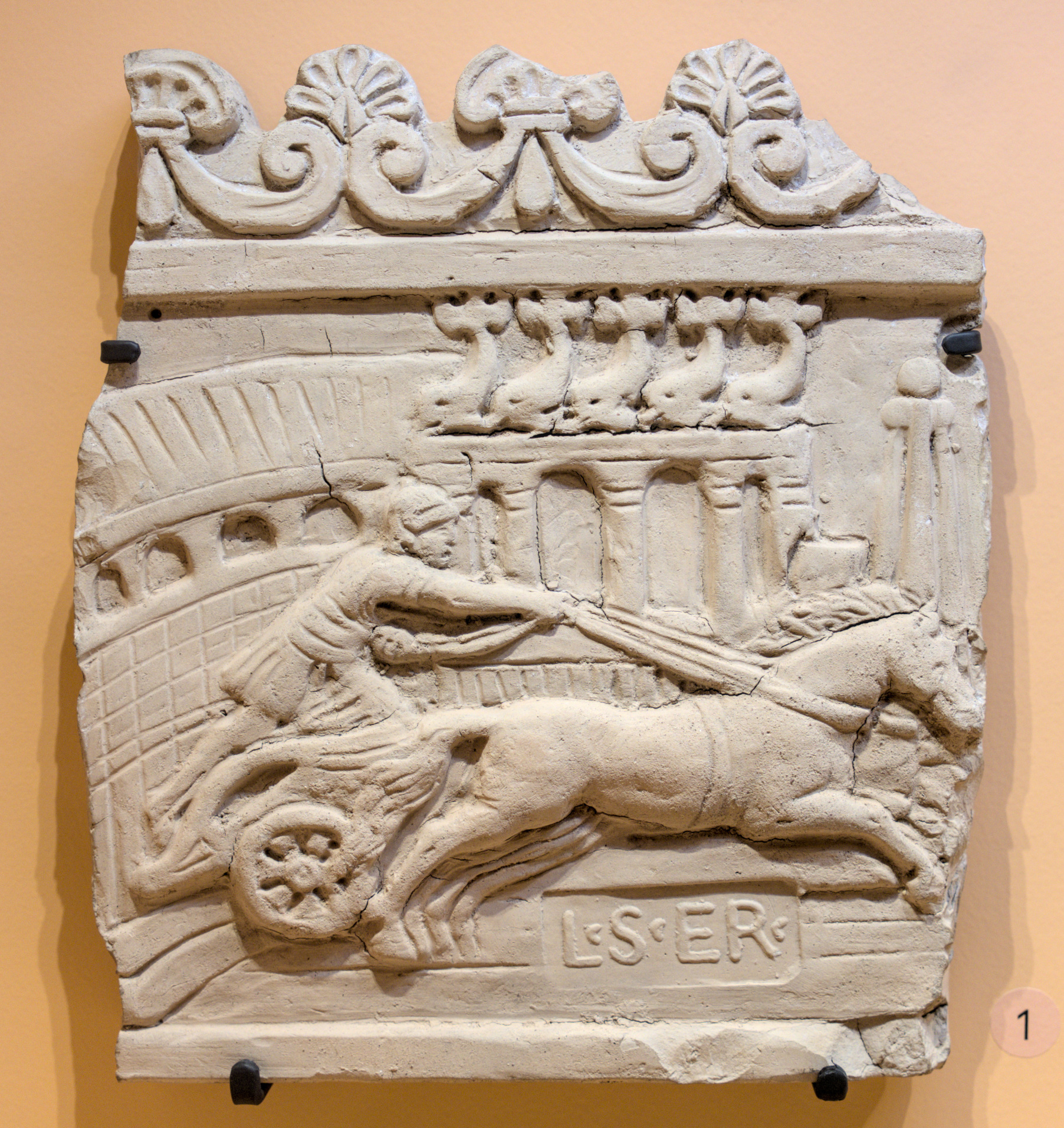
1st century relief of a racing biga beneath dolphin-shaped lap counters; ceramic, 1st century. The lettering is an artisan's mark.

Most cities had at least one dedicated chariot racing circuit. The city of Rome had several. Its main centre was the Circus Maximus which developed on the natural slopes and valley (the Vallis Murcia) between the Palatine Hill and Aventine Hill. It had a vast seating capacity: Boatwright estimates this as 150,000 before its rebuilding under Julius Caesar, and 250,000 under Trajan. (Note: There were many other circuses throughout the Roman Empire, all of them patterned after the Circus Maximus. The Circus of Maxentius, another major circus, was built at the beginning of the fourth century BC outside Rome, near the Via Appia. There were major circuses at Alexandria and Antioch, and Herod the Great built four circuses in Judaea. Archaeologists working on a housing development near the earliest Romano-British capital, Camulodunum, unearthed the first Roman chariot-racing arena to be found in Britain.) According to Humphrey, the higher seating estimate is traditional but excessive, and even at its greatest capacity, the circus probably accommodated no more than about 150,000. It was Rome's earliest and greatest circus. Its basic form and footprint were thought more or less coeval with the city's foundation, or with Rome's earliest Etruscan kings. Julius Caesar rebuilt it around 50 BC to a length of about 650 metres (2,130 ft) and width of 125 metres (410 ft). It had a semi-circular end, and a semi-open, slightly angled end where the chariots lined up across the track to begin the race, each enclosed within a cell known as a carcere ("prison") behind a spring-loaded gate. These were functionally equivalent to the Greek hysplex but were further staggered to accommodate a median barrier, known originally as a euripus (canal) but much later as the spina (spine). When the chariots were ready the editor, usually a high-status magistrate, dropped a white cloth; all the gates sprang open at the same time, allowing a fair start for all participants. Races were run counter-clockwise; starting positions were allocated by lottery.

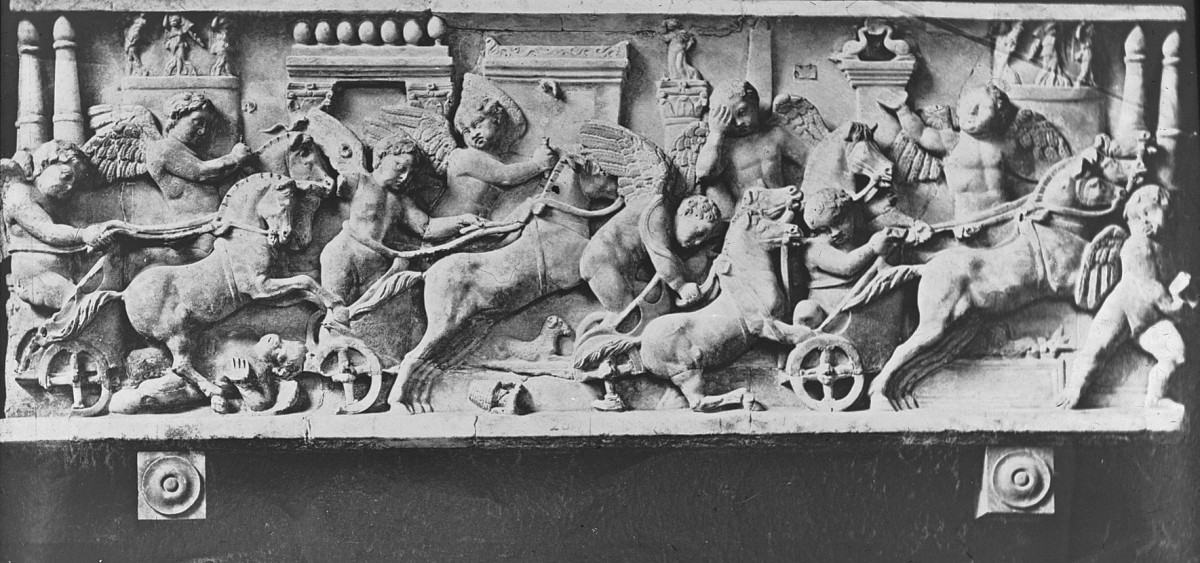
Chariot race of Cupids; ancient Roman sarcophagus in the Museo Archeologico (Naples); Brooklyn Museum Archives, Goodyear Archival Collection

The spina carried lap-counters, in the form of eggs or dolphins; the eggs were suggestive of Castor and Pollux, the mythic dioscuri, one human and one divine. They were born from an egg, divine patrons of horsemen and the Equestrian order. Dolphins were thought to be the swiftest of all creatures; they symbolised Neptune, god of the sea, earthquakes and horses.

The spina bore water-feature elements, blended with decorative and architectural features. It eventually became very elaborate, with temples, statues and obelisks and other forms of art, though the addition of these multiple adornments obstructed the view of spectators on the trackside's lower seats, which were close to the action. At each end of the spina was a meta, or turning point, consisting of three large gilded columns.

=== Spectators ===
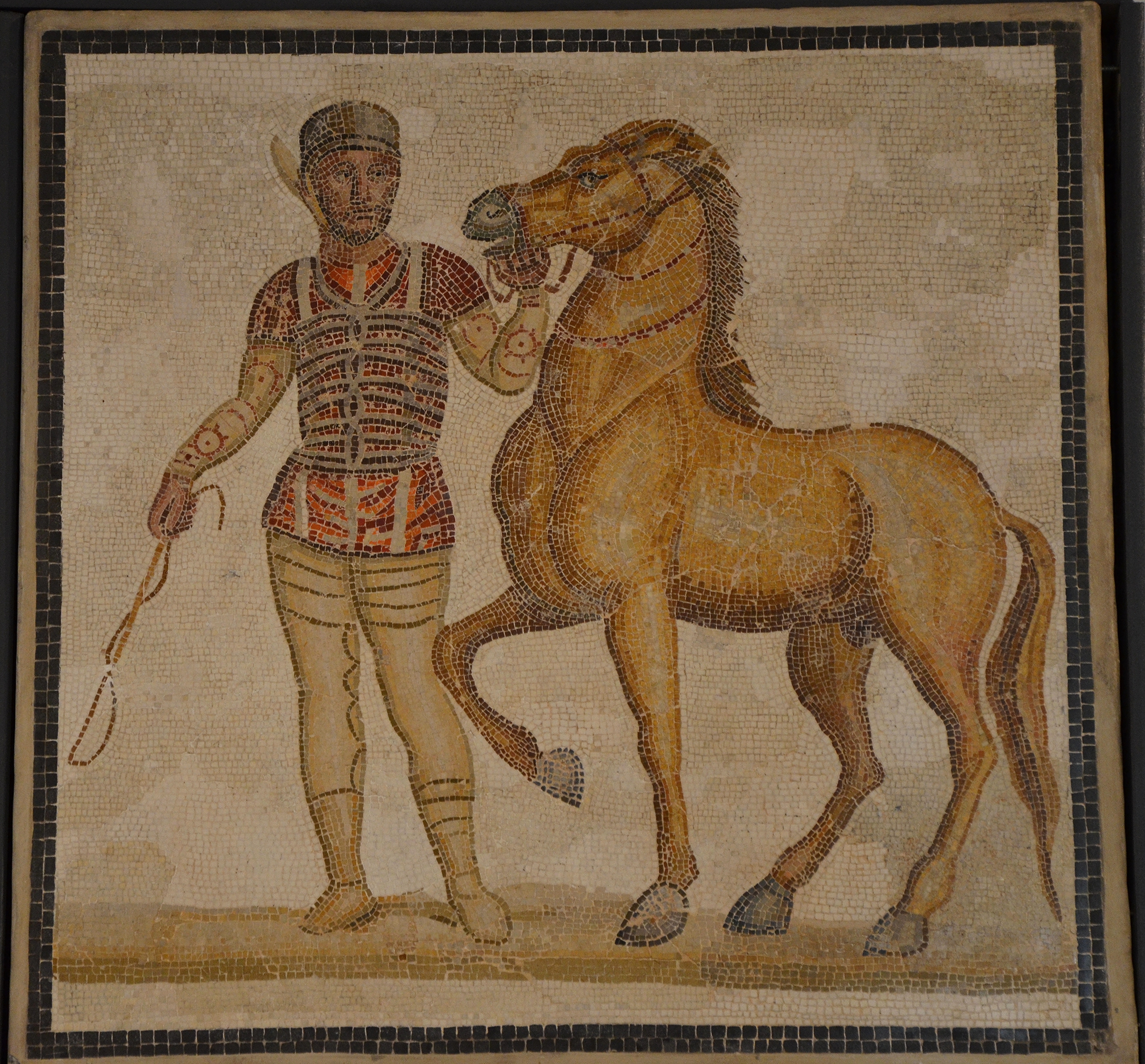

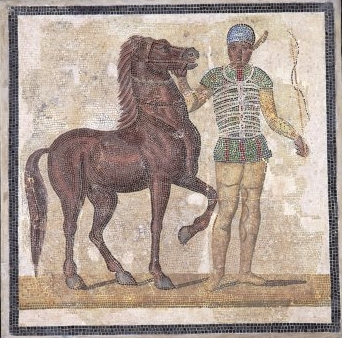

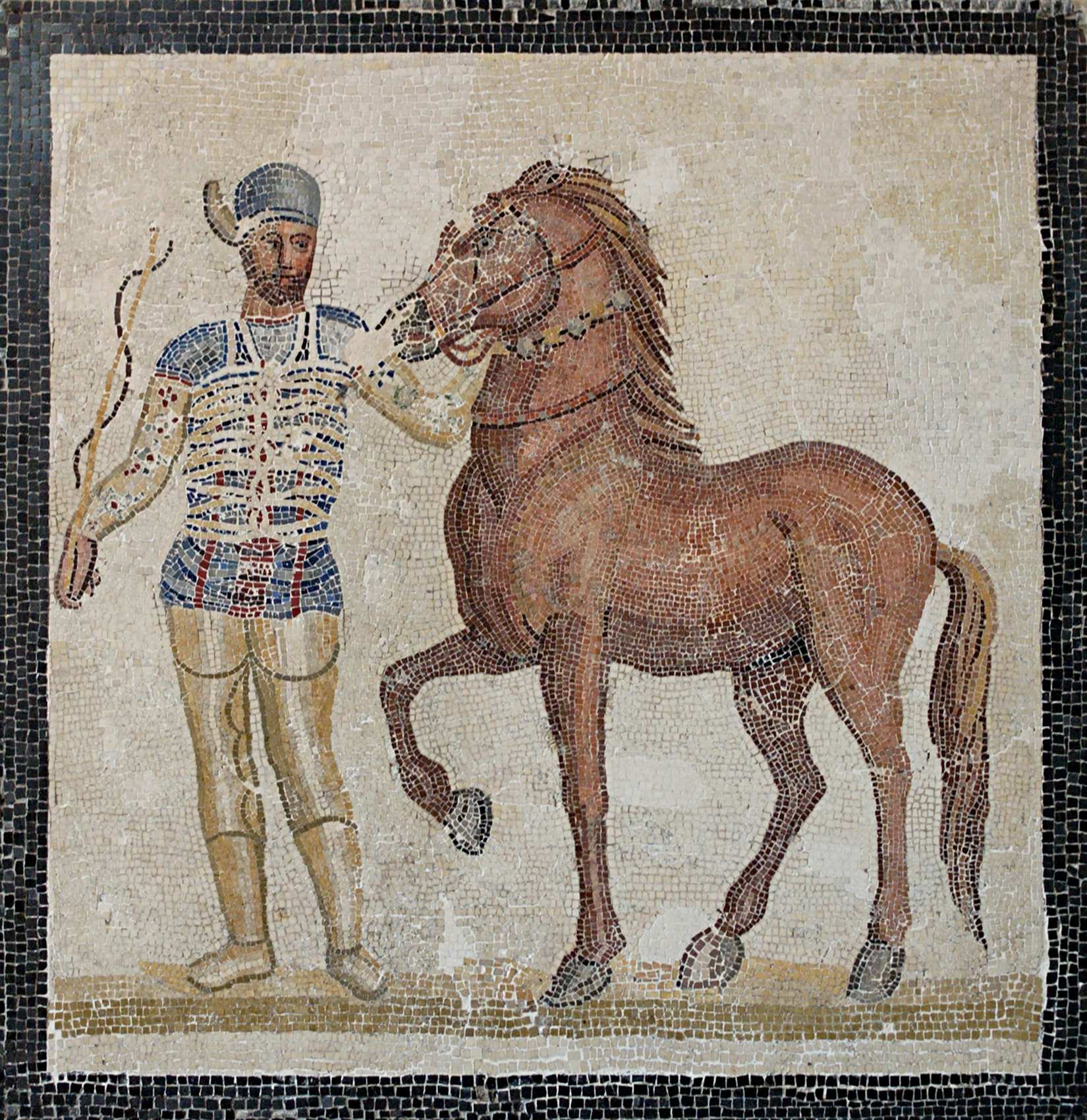

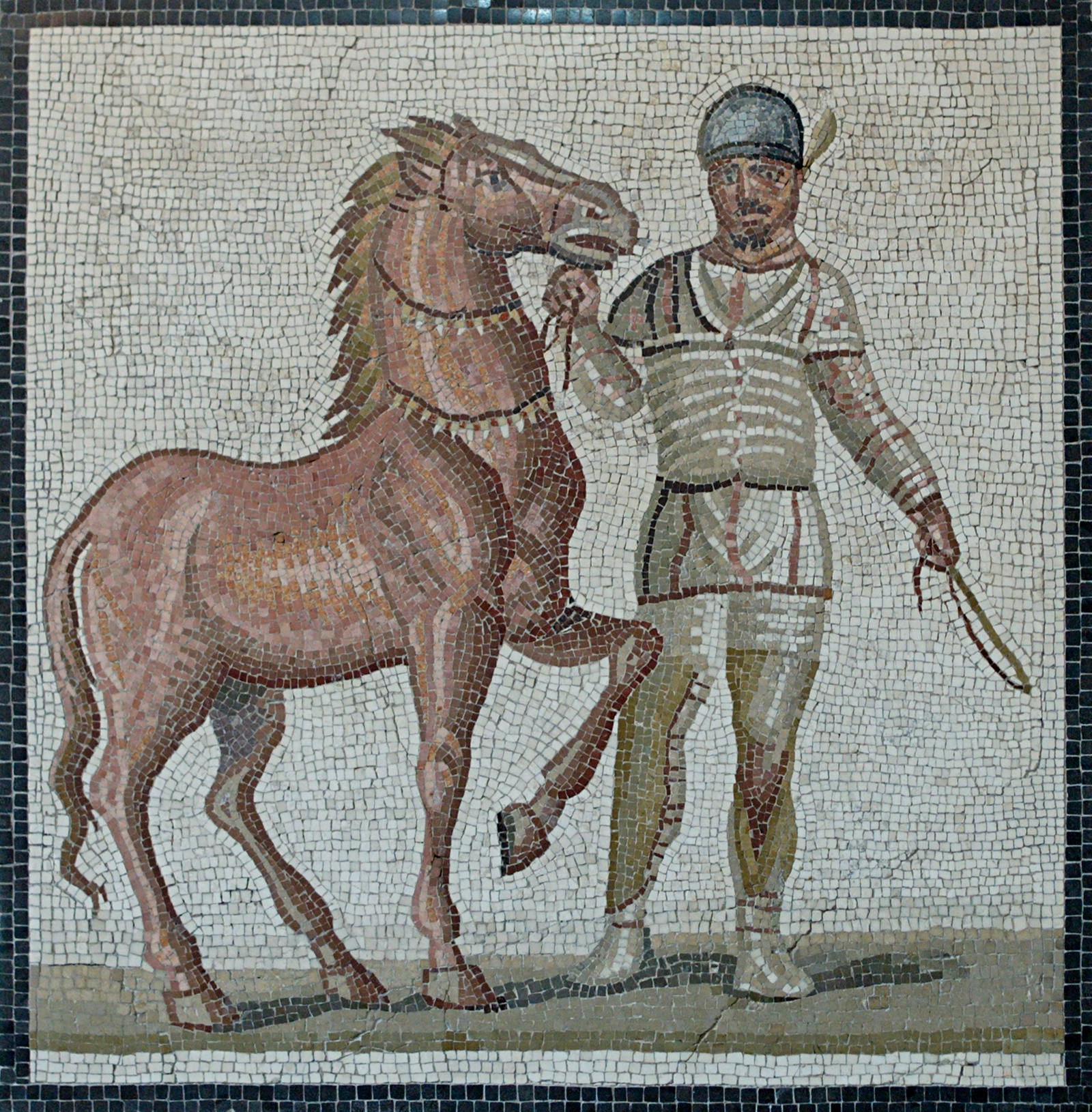
Charioteers of the Red, Green, Blue and White team; part of a mosaic of the third century AD, exhibited in the Museo Nazionale Romano.

Seats in the Circus were free for the poor, and either free or subsidised for the mass of citizens (plebs), whose lack of involvement in late Republican and Imperial politics was compensated, as far as Juvenal was concerned, by an endless supply of handouts and entertainments, or panem et circenses ("bread and circuses"). The seating nearest the track was reserved for senators, the rows behind them for equites and the remainder for everyone else. The better-off could pay for shaded seats with a better view. The Vestal virgins occupied their own privileged seating, close to the track. Men and women were supposed to occupy segregated seating but the "law of the place" allowed most to sit together, which for the Augustan poet Ovid presented opportunities for seduction. The circus was one of few places where the populace could assemble in vast numbers, and exercise the freedom of speech associated with theatre factions and claques, voicing support or criticism of their rulers and each other.

=== The races ===
The charioteers had to keep to their own lanes for the first two laps. Then they were free to jockey for position, cutting across the paths of their competitors, moving as close to the spina as they could, and whenever possible forcing their opponents to find another, much longer route forwards. Every team included a hortator, who rode horseback and signalled their faction's charioteers to help them navigate the dangers of the track. Roman drivers wrapped the reins round their waist, and steered using their body weight; with the reins looped around their torsos, they could lean from one side to the other to direct the horses' movement while keeping the hands free "for the whip and such". A driver who became entangled in a crash risked being trampled or dragged along the track by his own horses; charioteers carried a curved knife (falx) to cut their reins, and wore helmets and other protective gear. Spectacular crashes in which the chariot was destroyed and the charioteer and horses were incapacitated were called naufragia, (a "shipwreck").

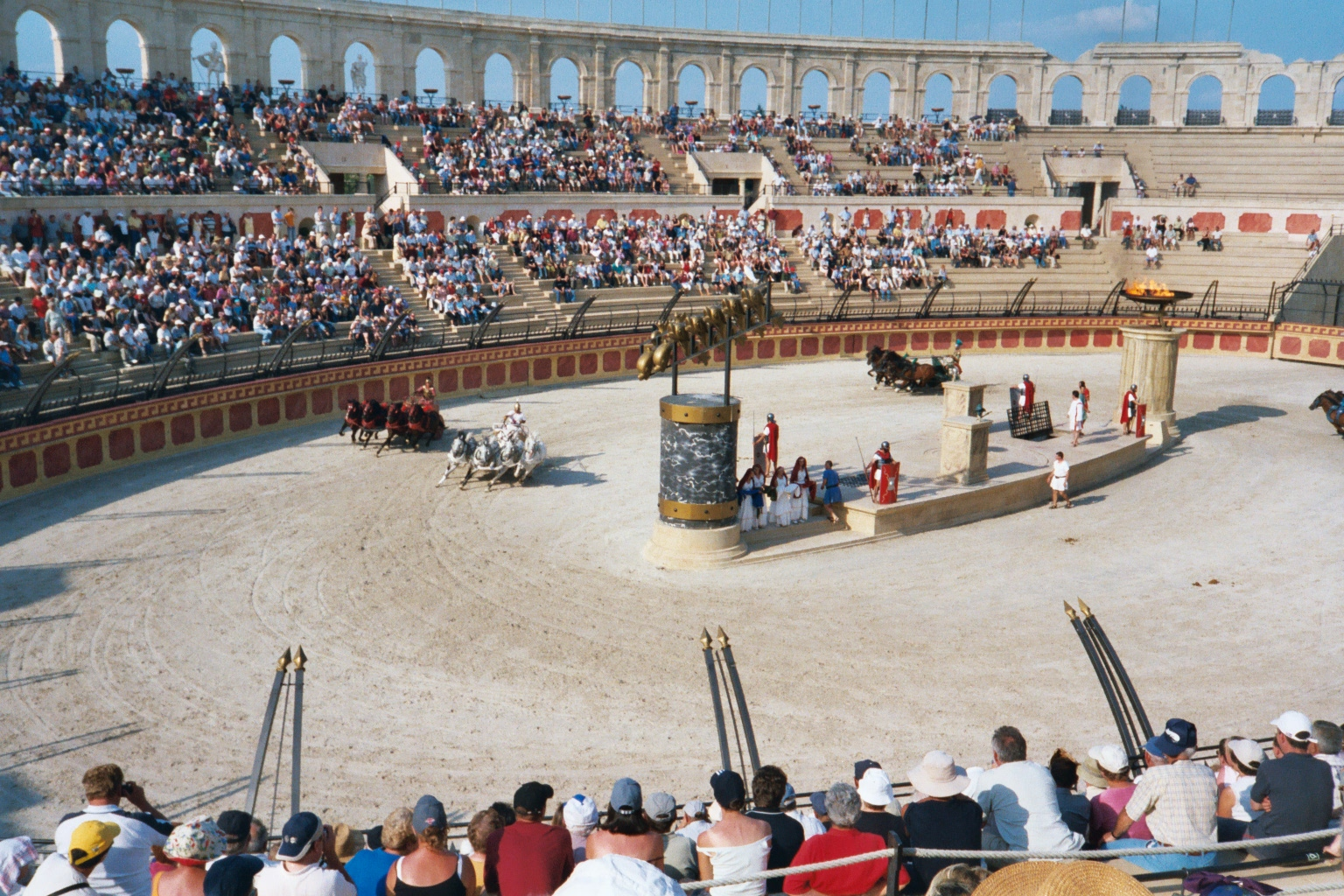
A modern recreation of chariot racing, in the amphitheatre of Puy du Fou theme park

The best charioteers could earn a great deal of prize money, in addition to their contracted subsistence pay. The prize money for up to fourth place was advertised beforehand, with first place winning up to 60,000 sesterces. Detailed records were kept of drivers' performances, and the names, breeds and pedigrees of famous horses. Betting on results was widespread, among all classes. Most races involved four-horse chariots (quadrigae), or less often, two-horse chariots (bigae). Just to display the skill of the driver and his horses, up to ten horses could be yoked to a single chariot. The quadriga races were the most important and frequent.

=== Frequency and laps ===
Magnates and emperors courted popularity by staging and subsidising as many races as they could, as often as possible. In Rome, races usually lasted 7 laps, or even 5, rather than the typical 12 laps of the Greek race. Some emperors were spendthrift enthusiasts: Caligula sponsored 10–12 races a day, Nero sponsored 20–24 a day. Commodus once held and subsidised 30 races in just 2 hours of a single afternoon; Dio Cassius predicted that such extravagance could only lead to government bankruptcy. In a previous century, the emperor Domitian had managed to squeeze an extraordinary 100 races into a single afternoon, presumably by drastically lowering the number of laps from the standard 7. Twenty-four races in a single day became the norm, until the slow collapse of Rome's economy in the West, when costs rose, sponsors were lost and racetracks were abandoned. By the 4th century AD, 24 races were held every day on 66 days each year. By the end of that century, public entertainments in Italy had come to an end in all but a few towns. The Circus Maximus was still adequately maintained for use, though for what purposes is uncertain. The last known beast-hunt there was in 523. The last recorded race there was in 549 AD, staged by the Ostrogothic king, Totila; whether this was a display of horsemanship or a chariot-race is not known.

=== Factions ===
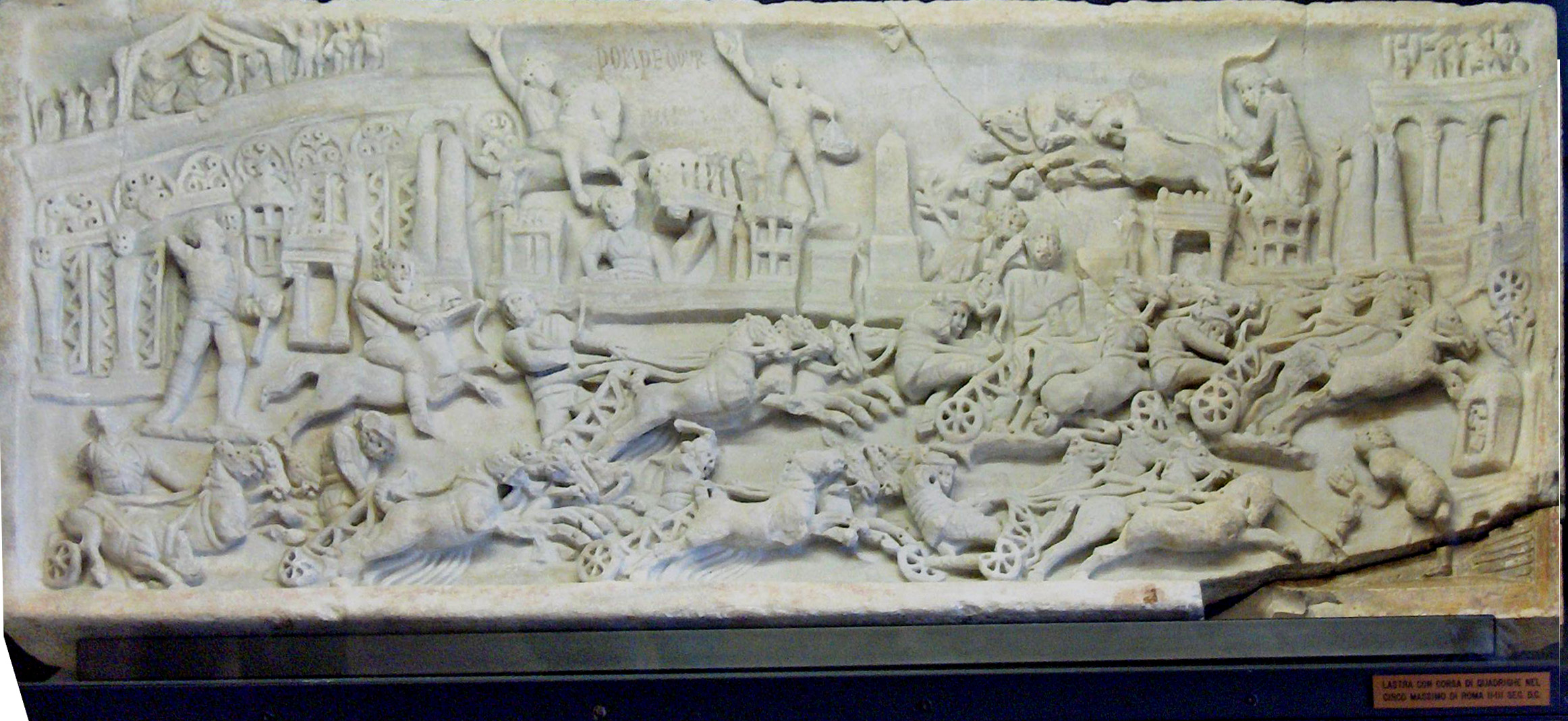
Bas-relief of a quadriga race in the Circus Maximus (2nd–3rd century)

Most Roman chariot drivers, and many of their supporters, belonged to one of four factions, social and business organisations that raised money to sponsor the races. The factions offered security to their members in return for their loyalty and contributions, and were headed by a patron or patrons. Each faction employed a large staff to serve and support their charioteers. Every circus seems to have independently followed the same model of organisation, including the four-colour naming system: Red, White, Blue, and Green. Senior managers (domini factionum) were usually of equestrian class. Investors were often wealthy, but of lower social status; driving a racing chariot was thought a very low class occupation, beneath the dignity of any citizen, but making money from it was truly disgraceful, so investors of high social status usually resorted to negotiations discreetly through agents, rather than risk losing reputation, status and privilege through infamia. No contemporary source describes these factions as official, but unlike many unofficial organisations in Rome, they were evidently tolerated as useful and effective rather than feared as secretive and potentially subversive. (Note: Legitimate, semi-official organisations included funeral and burial societies, which were usually self-regulated under the supervision of a local magnate or magistrate; they also had important social functions and were eligible for government grants but were expected to use all their income on provision of funeral services, not to make a profit for investors or stakeholders.)

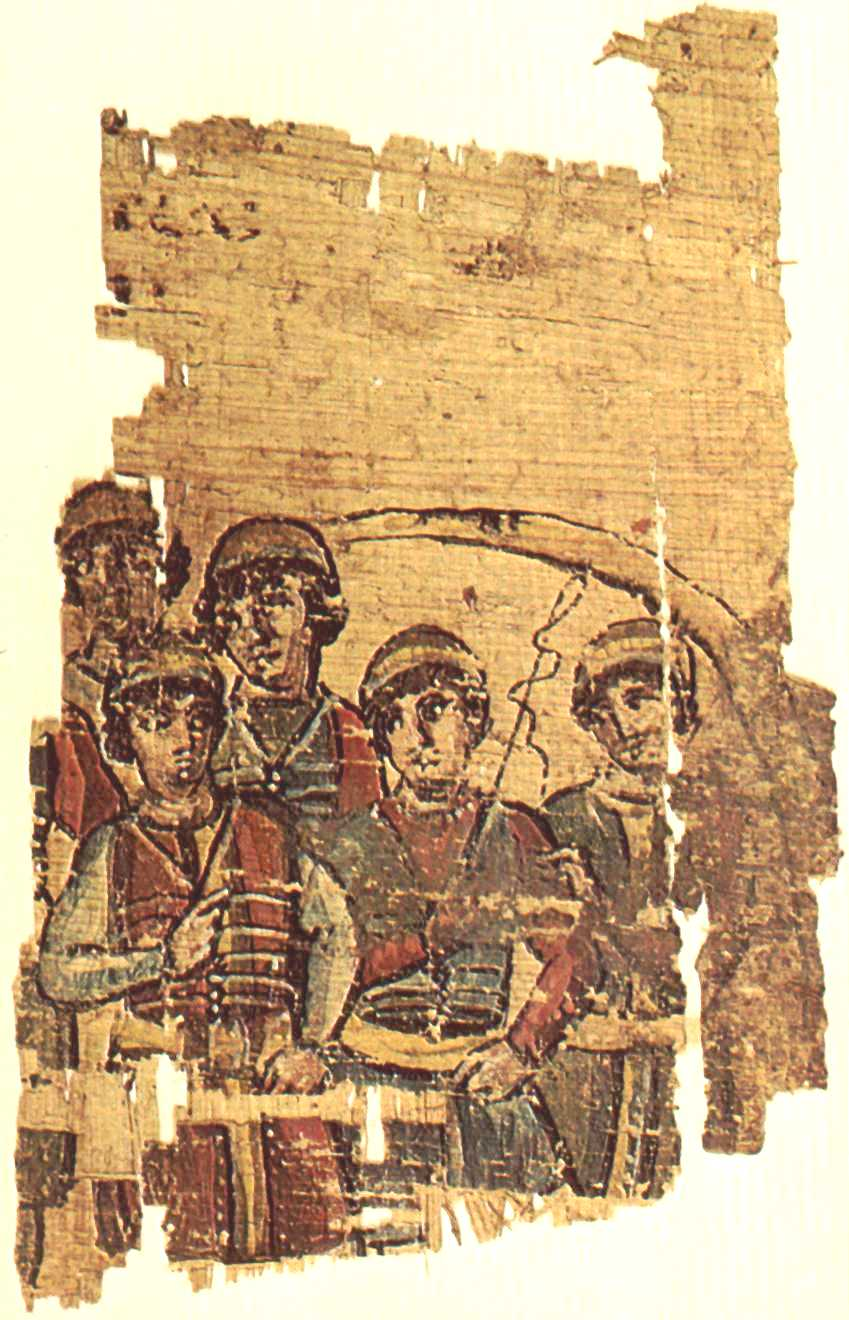
Charioteers in the red tunics of their faction from the Charioteer Papyrus (c. 500)

Tertullian claims that there were originally just two factions, White and Red, sacred to winter and summer respectively. By his time, there were four factions; the Reds were dedicated to Mars, the Whites to the Zephyrus, the Greens to Mother Earth or spring, and the Blues to the sky and sea or autumn. Each faction could enter up to three chariots in a race. Members of the same faction often collaborated against the other entrants, for example to force them to crash into the spina (a legal and encouraged tactic). The driver's clothing was color-coded in accordance with his faction, which would help distant spectators to keep track of the race's progress.

The emperor Domitian created two new factions, the Purples and Golds, but they vanished from the record very soon after his death. The Blues and the Greens gradually became the most prestigious factions, supported by emperors and the populace alike. Blue versus Green clashes sometimes broke out during the races. The Reds and Whites are seldom mentioned in the literature, but their continued activity is documented in inscriptions and in curse tablets.

=== Roman charioteers ===
Charioteers occupied a peculiar position in Roman society. If originally citizens, their chosen career made infames of them, denying them many of the privileges, protections and dignities of full citizenship. Undertakers, prostitutes and pimps, butchers, executioners, and heralds were considered infamous, for various reasons; but although gladiators, actors, charioteers and any others who earned a living on stage, arena or racetrack were infames, the best of them could earn popular and elite support that verged on adoration, and near-fabulous wealth if not respectability. Juvenal bewailed that the earnings of the charioteer Lacerta were a hundred times more than a lawyer's fee. Emperors who took the reins as charioteer, or promoted drivers to elite status or freely mixed with arenarii—as did Caligula, Nero and Elagabalus, for example—were also notoriously "bad" rulers. Two jurists of the later imperial era, and some modern scholars, argue against the legal status of charioteers as infames, on the grounds that athletic competitions were not mere entertainment but "seemed useful" as honourable displays of Roman strength and virtus.

Most Roman charioteers started their careers as slaves, who had neither reputation nor honour to lose. Of more than 200 dedications to named charioteers catalogued by Horsmann, more than half are of unknown social status. Of the remainder, 66 are slaves, 14 are freedmen, 13 either slaves or freedmen and only one a freeborn citizen.

All race competitors, regardless of their social status or whether they completed the race, were paid a driver's fee. Slave-charioteers could not lawfully own property, including money, but their masters could pay them regardless, or retain all or some accumulated driving fees and winnings on their behalf, as the price of their eventual manumission. While most freed slave-charioteers would have become clients of their former master, some would have earned more than enough to buy their freedom outright, assuming they survived that long. Scorpus won over 2,000 races before being killed in a collision at the meta when he was about 27 years old. The charioteer Florus's tomb inscription describes him as infans (not adult). Gaius Appuleius Diocles won 1,462 out of 4,257 races for various teams during his exceptionally long and lucky career. When he retired at the age of 42, his lifetime winnings reportedly totalled 35,863,120 sesterces (HS), not counting driver's fees. His personal share of this is unknown but Vamplew calculates that even if Diocles's personal winnings were only a tenth part of the declared prize money, this would have yielded him an average annual income of 150,000 HS.

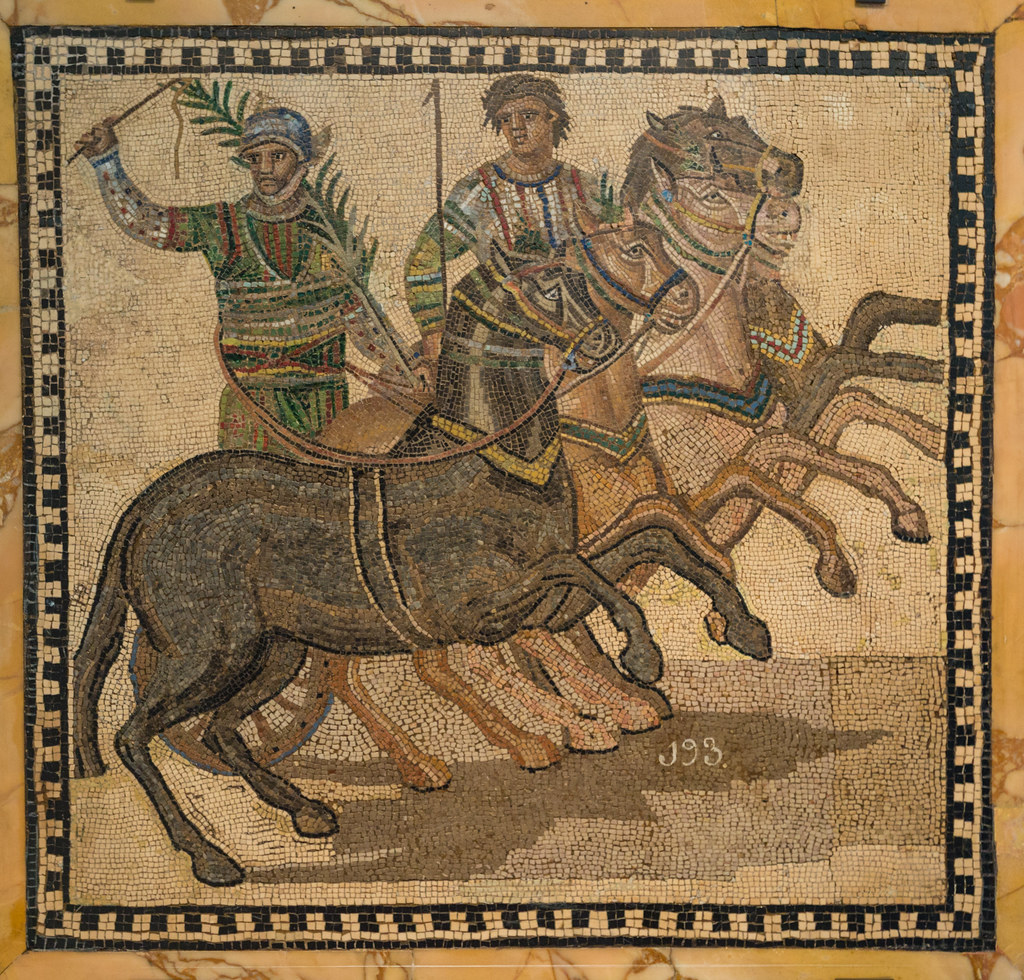
A winner of a Roman chariot race, from the Green team

Most races and wins were team efforts, results of co-operation between charioteers of the same faction, but victories won in single races were the most highly esteemed by drivers and their public. Charioteers followed a ferociously competitive, charismatic profession, routinely risked violent death, and aroused a compulsive, even morbid reverence among their followers. A supporter of the Red faction is said to have thrown himself on the funeral pyre of his favourite charioteer. More usually, some charioteers and supporters tried to enlist supernatural help by covertly burying curse tablets at or near the track, appealing to spirits and deities of the underworld for the success of their favourites or disaster for their opponents; a common practise among Romans of all classes though like all magic, strictly illegal, and punishable by death.

Some of the most talented and successful charioteers were suspected of winning through the illicit agency of dark forces. Ammianus Marcellinus, writing during Valentinian's reign (AD 364–375), describes various cases of chariot drivers prosecuted for witchcraft or the procurement of spells. One charioteer was beheaded for having his young son trained in witchcraft to help him win his races; and another burnt at the stake for practising witchcraft.

=== Horses ===
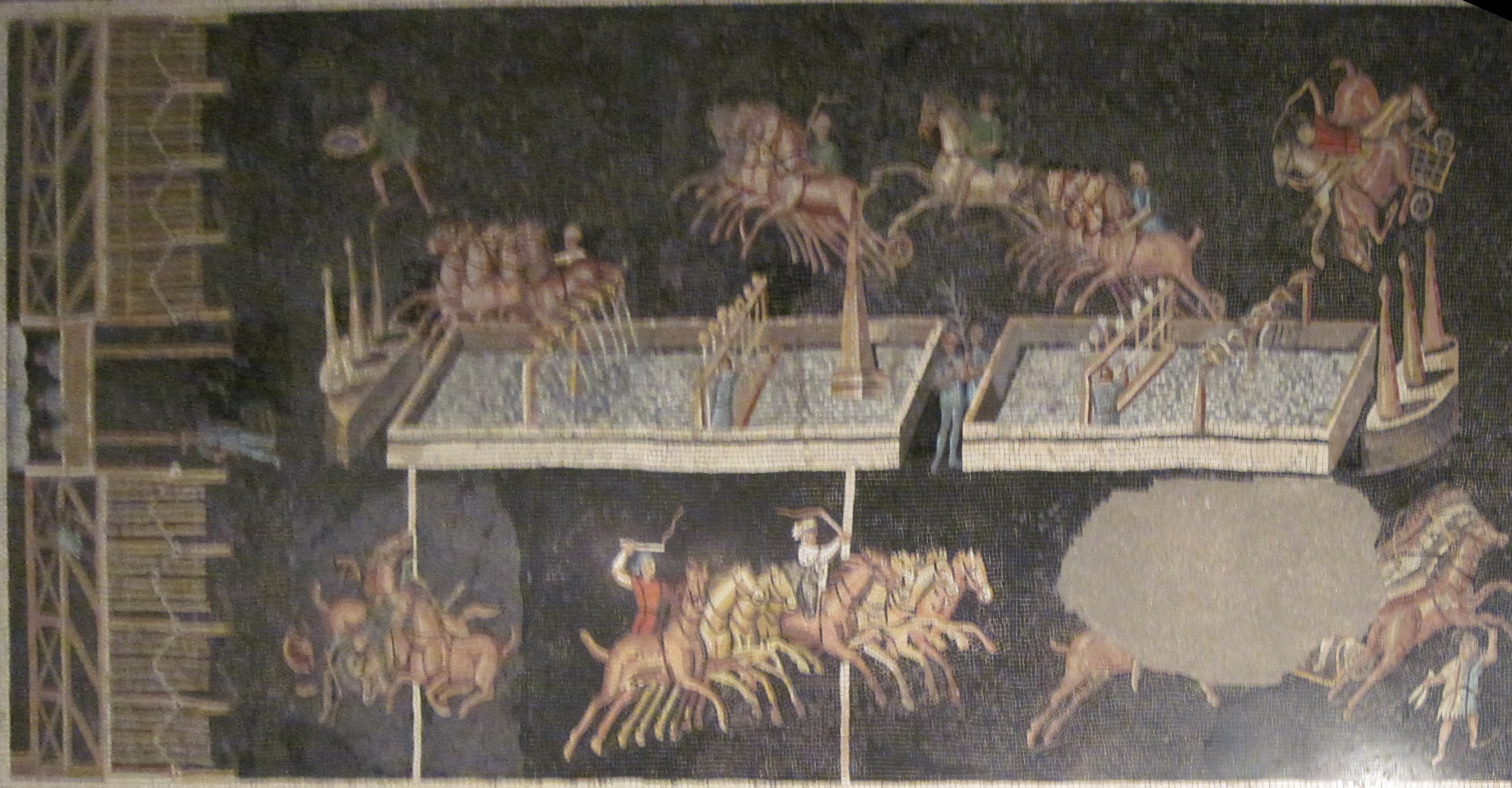
Mosaic from Lyon illustrating a chariot race with the four factions: Blue, Green, Red and White

The horses, too, could become celebrities; they were purpose-bred and were trained relatively late, from 5 years old. The Romans favoured particular native breeds from Hispania and north Africa. One of Diocles's horses, named Cotynus, raced with him in various teams 445 times, alongside Abigeius, a treasured "trace" horse. A chariot's "trace" horses partly pulled the chariot and partly guided it, as flankers to the central pair, who were yoked to the chariot and provided both speed and power. A left-side trace horse's steady performance could mean the difference between victory and disaster; mares were thought the steadiest. Left-side trace horses were the closest to the spina, and are most likely to be named in the race record. Another key performer in a standard quadriga race was the right-hand yoke-horse. Celebrity horses named in Diocles's extraordinary record of 445 races and more than 100 wins in a year include Pompeianus, Lucidus and Galata.

== Byzantine context ==
Constantine I (r. 306–337) refounded the eastern Greek city of Byzantium as a "New Rome", to serve as the administrative center of the eastern half of the Empire, and renamed it Constantinople. He replaced or restored the city's chariot-racing circuit (hippodrome), which had been provided by Septimius Severus. As a Christian emperor, or at least one with Christian leanings, Constantine supported and financed Constantinople's chariot racing infrastructure and overheads in preference to gladiatorial combat, which he considered a vestige of paganism. A possibility of spiritual damage through the witnessing of traditional public spectacles had concerned Christian apologists since at least Tertullian's time. The Olympic Games were eventually ended by Emperor Theodosius I (r. 379–395) in 393, perhaps in a move to suppress paganism and promote Christianity. Gladiator contests were eventually abandoned, but chariot racing and theatrical entertainments remained popular. The Church did not, or perhaps could not, prevent them, although prominent Christian writers attacked them.

Justinian I's reformed legal code specifically prohibits drivers from placing curses on their opponents, and invites their co-operation in bringing offenders before the authorities, rather than acting like assassins or vigilantes. This not only reiterates a very longstanding prohibition of witchcraft throughout the Empire but confirms a reputation that charioteers had for living at the very edge of the law, for violent thefts, blackmail and bullying as debt collectors on their masters' behalf, and an easy-going criminality that could extend to the murder of opponents and enemies, disguised as rough but rightful justice.

A sixth-seventh century Byzantine graffito in the Hagia Sophia shows a charioteer named Samonas, performing a victory lap. The graffito, no earlier than 537, includes an engraved cross to seek God's help for the charioteer. Samonas is otherwise unknown. Several earlier Byzantine charioteers are known by name or race records, six of them through short, laudatory verse epigrams; namely, Anastasius; Julianus of Tyre; Faustinus and his son Constantinus; Uranius; and Porphyrius. Among these, the single epigram to Anastasius offers very little personal information, but Porphyrius is the subject of thirty-four. He is described as the best charioteer of his time; and as the only charioteer known to have won the diversium twice in one day. (Note: This may be an exaggeration, as epigram 374 claims that a charioteer named Constantine won 25 races in the morning, 21 of them by diversium.)

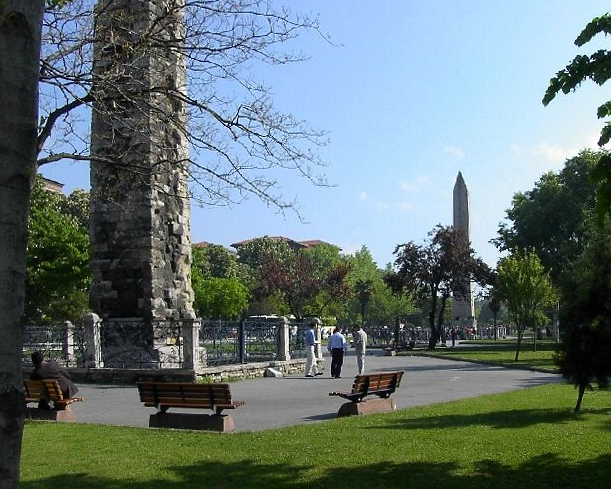
The Hippodrome of Constantinople in Istanbul is more or less levelled, apart from some structures on the spina. The Walled Obelisk in the foreground and Thutmose's Obelisk is on the right.

The diversium was unique to Byzantine chariot racing, a formal rematch between the winner and a loser, in which the competing charioteers drove each other's team and chariot. A winning charioteer could thus win twice over, driving the same horse team that he had defeated earlier, virtually eliminating mere chance or better horses as the deciding factors in both victories. In Byzantine chariot racing, the expected standards of professional athleticism were very high. Competitors were sometimes assigned to age categories, though very loosely; youths under approximately 17 (described as "beardless"), young men (17–20), and adult men over 20; but skill counted more than age, or stamina. In some circumstances, the charioteers themselves performed formal, ritualised mimes, or dances, which won them fame and adulation Preparation for races could involve ritualised public dialogues between charioteers, imperial officials and emperors, a prescribed liturgy of questions, answers, and processional orders of precedence. Each race required the emperor's consent.

=== Byzantine racing factions ===
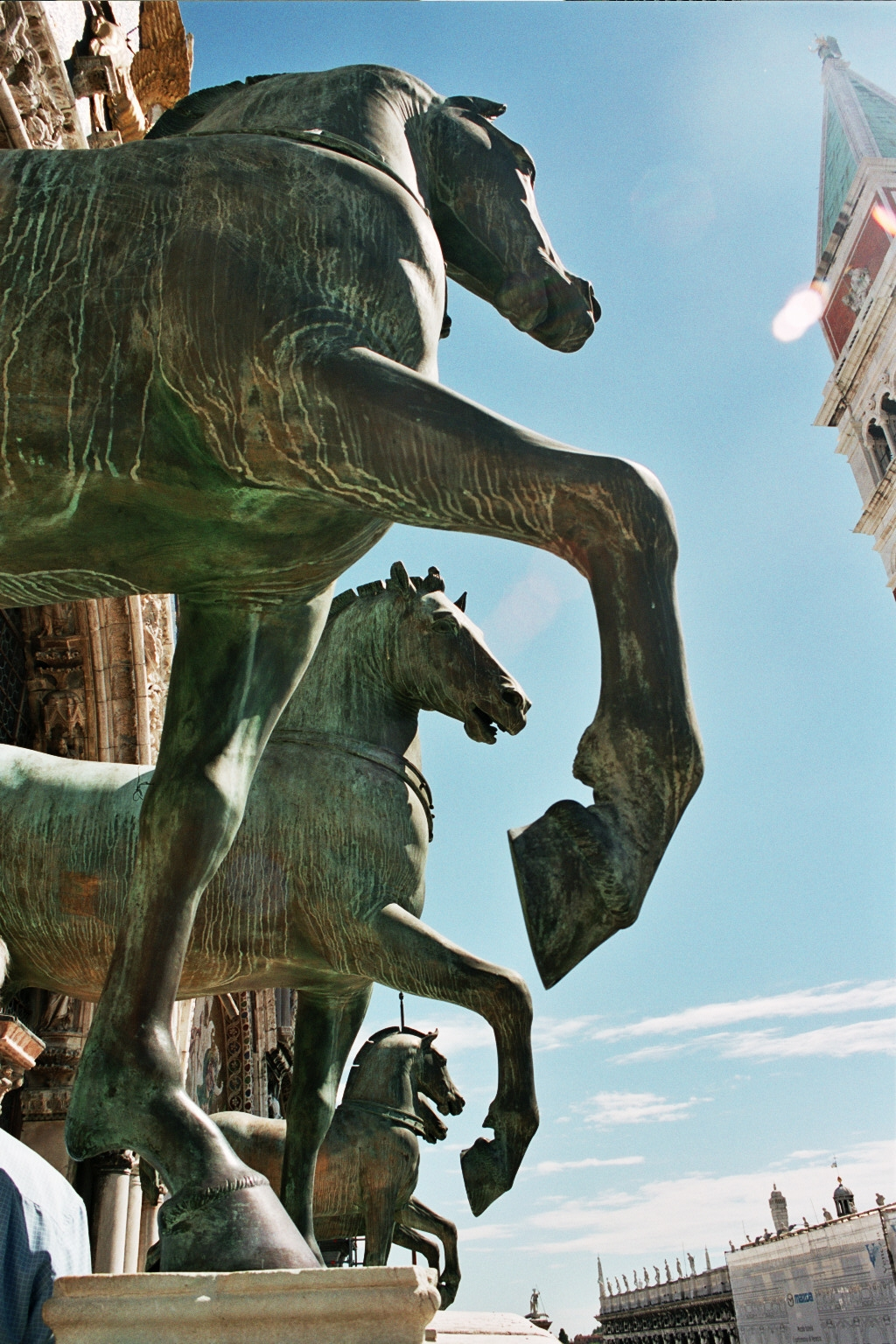
The Triumphal Quadriga is a set of Roman or Greek bronze statues of four horses, originally part of a monument depicting a quadriga. They date from late Classical Antiquity and were long displayed at the Hippodrome of Constantinople. In 1204 AD, Doge Enrico Dandolo sent them to Venice as part of the loot sacked from Constantinople in the Fourth Crusade.

In the eastern provinces, and Constantinople itself, the earliest evidence for colour factions is from AD 315, coincident with the extension of imperial authority into local government and public life. The cost of financing the races was split between the factions, the state, the Emperors, and senior officials. The annually appointed consuls were obliged to personally fund their own inaugural games. (Note: Emperors could also hold consular office, sometimes several times during their rule, with the same obligation to fund their own inaugural games.)

Members of racing factions (known as demes), were a minority among chariot racing enthusiasts as a whole. In Byzantium as elsewhere, racing fans cheered on their favorite charioteers, and sought out the company of like-minded supporters. Charioteers could change their factional allegiance but their fans did not necessarily follow them. Semi-permanent alliances of Blues (Βένετοι, Vénetoi) and Greens (Πράσινοι, Prásinoi) overshadowed the Whites (Λευκοὶ, Leukoí) and Reds (Ῥούσιοι, Rhoúsioi). In the 5th century, the outstanding Byzantine charioteer Porphyrius raced as a "Blue" or a "Green" at various times; he was celebrated by each faction, and by the reigning Emperor, and was honoured with several imperially subsidised monuments on a grand scale in the Hippodrome. While the racing factions, their supporters and the populace at large were overwhelmingly composed of commoners, as in Rome, Cameron (1976) sees no justification for the description of any Byzantine racing faction, racing sponsor or factional ideology as "populist", nor the conflicts between factions and authorities as expressions of "class conflict" or religious squabbling on a grand scale. The urban mass disturbances that characterise much of Byzantium's early history were not associated with racing factions until the 5th century, when the imperial government appointed managers of both the Circus races and the Theatres, responsible for the production and performance of the chants, theatrical displays and lavish religious ceremonies that accompanied imperial court rituals and chariot races. The acclamations of emperors and of winning charioteers employed much the same triumphalist language, symbolism, honours and pledges of allegiance. From around the mid-fifth century, the support and approval of the factions in confirming the legitimacy of emperors became a formal requirement. The factions were represented as loyal commoners, or "the people".

Social discontent and disturbances in Constantinople tended to focus on the Hippodrome, which was not only ideal for racing but by far the largest and most conveniently designed space for mass meetings and their containment. The structure of the Hippodrome in Constantinople allowed the people to voice their religious and political opinion in the presence of the emperor, thus empowering the charioteers who were presented as political mediators between the people and the emperor. In 498, the crowd showed its dissatisfaction with the emperor Anastasius by launching a hail of stones at the kathisma; during a near-revolutionary riot of 512 at the Hippodrome, the same emperor feared for his life, and offered to abdicate; the crowd, apparently seeing this offer as both humble and magnanimous, found something like a "popular voice" and shifted their collective posture from opposition to support. Byzantium's theatre claques, which already had a reputation for well-organised violence, were now identified with the racing factions, and were thought to represent the rowdiest, most uncontrollable elements among the Blues and Greens. Blue–Green rivalry increasingly erupted into armed and lethal gang warfare. Justin I (r. 518–527) took severe, but apparently indiscriminate, misdirected and ultimately ineffective measures against urban violence after a citizen was murdered in the church of Hagia Sophia. Long-running factional disorder culminated in the Nika riots of 532 AD, against the backdrop of scheduled chariot races on the Ides of January, and factional "discontent" at political corruption and mismanagement. The Blues and Greens united and attempted but failed to overthrow the emperor; thousands were killed by the Byzantine military in retribution, including many ordinary citizens. The Byzantine historian Procopius saw the entire affair as a failure of the Emperor and his authorities to manage their imperial troops and govern their people, and the almost complete lack of a dedicated police force.

Civil law reforms enacted by Justinian I in 541 ensured that only emperors or their representatives could subsidise the races; soon after, the emperor Tiberius II Constantine curbed imperial spending on the factions, which further reduced their power and influence. Chariot racing declined further in the course of the seventh century, in line with the Empire's dwindling economy and loss of territory. After the Nika riots, the factions had become less antagonistic to imperial authority as their importance and roles in imperial ceremony were increased. The iconoclast emperor Constantine V (r. 741–775) deployed both Green and Blue "rowdies" in his anti-monastic campaigns, staging theatrical shows in which monks and nuns were exposed to public ridicule, abuse and forced marriages. The number of races per race-day declined sharply to eight in the 10th century. The racing factions in Byzantium continued their activity, though much reduced, until the imperial court was moved to Blachernae during the 12th century.

== See also ==
- Carriage driving
- Harness racing
- Oval track racing
- Spectacles in ancient Rome

Media related to Chariot racing at Wikimedia Commons

== Sources ==
=== Primary sources ===
- Theophanes; Turtledove, Harry (1982). The Chronicle of Theophanes: An English Translation of anni mundi 6095–6305 (A.D. 602–813). Philadelphia: University of Pennsylvania Press. ISBN 978-0-8122-1128-3.
- Homer. The Iliad – via Wikisource.
- Pausanias. Description of Greece, Book 6: Elis II. English translation Perseus Project.
- Pindar. Isthmian Odes – Isthmian 1. See original text in Perseus Project.
- Pindar. Olympian Odes – Olympian 1. See original text in Perseus Project.
- Pindar. Pythian Odes – Pythian 5. See original text in Perseus Project.
- Prokopios; Kaldellis, Anthony (2010). The Secret History with Related Texts. Indianapolis, Indiana: Hackett Publishing Company, Incorporated. ISBN 978-1-60384-180-1.
- Thucydides. "Book 6" . History of the Peloponnesian War. Translated by Richard Crawley – via Wikisource.
- Tertullian. De Spectaculis. See original text in the Latin library.

=== Secondary sources ===
- Adkins, Lesley; Adkins, Roy A. (1998a). Handbook to Life in Ancient Greece. New York and Oxford, UK: Oxford University Press. ISBN 0-19-512491-X.
- Adkins, Lesley; Adkins, Roy A. (1998b). Handbook to Life in Ancient Rome. New York and Oxford, UK: Oxford University Press. ISBN 0-19-512332-8.
- "Apobates". Encyclopedia "The Helios" (in Greek). Vol. III. Athens. 1945–1955.
- Balsdon, John Percy Vyvian Dacre (1974). Life and Leisure in Ancient Rome. Bodley Head.
- Beard, Mary; North, John A.; Price, S. R. F. (1998). Religions of Rome: A History. Cambridge: Cambridge University Press. ISBN 0-521-31682-0.
- Bell, Sinclair W. (January 2014). "Roman Chariot-Racing: Charioteers, Factions, Spectators". In P. Christesen; D. Kyle (eds.). Wiley-Blackwell Companion to Sport and Spectacle in Greek and Roman Antiquity. doi:10.1002/9781118609965.ch33.
- Bennett, Dirk (December 1997). "Chariot Racing in the Ancient World". History Today. 47 (12). Britain: 41–48. Archived from the original on 2008-02-06.
- Boatwright, Mary Taliaferro; Gargola, Daniel J.; Talbert, Richard J.A. (2004). "Circuses and Chariot Racing". The Romans: From Village to Empire. New York and Oxford, UK: Oxford University Press. ISBN 0-19-511875-8.
- Cameron, Alan (1976). Circus Factions: Blues and Greens at Rome and Byzantium. Oxford: Clarendon Press. ISBN 978-0198148043.
- Cameron, Alan (1973). Porphyrius: The Charioteer. Oxford: Clarendon Press.
- Camp, John Mck. (1998). Horses and Horsemanship in the Athenian Agora. Princeton, NJ: The American School of Classical Studies at Athens. ISBN 0-87661-639-2.
- Evans, James Allan Stewart (2005). "The Nika Revolt of 532". The Emperor Justinian and the Byzantine Empire. Westport, CN: Greenwood Publishing Group. ISBN 0-313-32582-0.
- Dougherty, Carol; Kurke, Leslie (2003). The Cultures Within Ancient Greek Culture: Contact, Conflict, Collaboration. Cambridge, UK: Cambridge University Press. ISBN 0-521-81566-5.
- Finley, Moses I.; Pleket, H. W. (1976). The Olympic Games: The First Thousand Years. New York: Viking Press. ISBN 0-670-52406-9.
- Freeman, Charles (April 2004). "St Mark's Square: An Imperial Hippodrome?". History Today. 54 (4). Britain: 39.
- Futrell, Alison (2006). The Roman Games: A Sourcebook. Malden, MA and Oxford, UK: Blackwell Publishing. ISBN 1-4051-1569-6.
- Gagarin, Michael (January 1983). "Antilochus' Strategy: The Chariot Race in Iliad 23". Classical Philology. 78 (1). The University of Chicago Press: 35–39. doi:10.1086/366744. JSTOR 269909. S2CID 161210505.
- Golden, Mark (2004). Sport in the Ancient World from A to Z. New York: Routledge. ISBN 0-415-24881-7.
- Gregory, Timothy E. (2010). A History of Byzantium. Malden, MA: Wiley-Blackwell. ISBN 978-1-4051-8471-7.
- Harris, Harold Arthur (1972). Sport in Greece and Rome. Ithaca, NY: Cornell University Press. ISBN 0-8014-0718-4.
- Harris, H. A. (2014). "The organisation of Roman racing". In Scanlon, Thomas F. (ed.). Sport in the Greek and Roman Worlds: Volume 2, Greek Athletic Identities and Roman Sports and Spectacle. Oxford Readings in Classical Studies. Oxford University Press. ISBN 978-0198703785.
- Hathaway, Jane (2003). "Bilateral Factionalism in Ottoman Egypt". A Tale of Two Factions: Myth, Memory, and Identity in Ottoman Egypt and Yemen. Albany: State University of New York Press. ISBN 0-7914-5883-0.
- Humphrey, John H. (1986). Roman Circuses: Arenas for Chariot Racing. Berkeley and Los Angeles: University of California. ISBN 978-0-520-04921-5.
- Köhne, Eckart; Ewigleben, Cornelia; Jackson, Ralph (2000). Gladiators and Caesars: The Power of Spectacle in Ancient Rome. British Museum Press. ISBN 978-0-7141-2316-5.
- Kyle, Donald G. (1993) [1987]. Athletics in Ancient Athens. Leiden, The Netherlands: E.J. Brill. ISBN 90-04-09759-7.
- Kyle, Donald G. (2007). Sport and Spectacle in the Ancient World. Malden, MA and Oxford, UK: Blackwell Publishing. ISBN 978-0-631-22971-1.
- Lançon, Bertrand (2000). "Festivals and Entertainments". Rome in Late Antiquity: Everyday Life and Urban Change, AD 312–609. New York and London: Routledge (Taylor & Francis). ISBN 0-415-92976-8.
- Laurence, Ray (1996) [1994]. Roman Pompeii: Space and Society. New York and London: Routledge (Taylor & Francis). ISBN 0-415-14103-6.
- Liebeschuetz, John Hugo Wolfgang Gideon (2003). "Shows and Factions". The Decline and Fall of the Roman City. Oxford: Oxford University Press. ISBN 0-19-926109-1.
- McComb, David G. (2004). Sports in World History. New York and London: Routledge (Taylor & Francis). ISBN 0-415-31811-4.
- Meijer, Fik; Waters, Liz (2010). Chariot Racing in the Roman Empire. Baltimore, MD: Johns Hopkins University Press. ISBN 978-0-8018-9697-2.
- Mus, P. Dionysius (2001–2011). "Ludi Circenses (longer version)". Societas via Romana.
- Neils, Jenifer; Tracy, Stephen V. (2003). Games at Athens. The American School of Classical Studies at Athens. ISBN 0-87661-641-4.
- Olivová, Věra (1989). "Chariot Racing in the Ancient World". Nikephoros – Zeitschrift für Sport und Kultur im Altertum. 2. Weidmann: 65–88. ISBN 3-615-00058-7.
- Osiek, Carolyn (2006). "The Self-Defining Praxis of the Developing Ecclesia". In Mitchell, Margaret M.; Young, Frances M. (eds.). Origins to Constantine. The Cambridge History of Christianity. Vol. 1. Cambridge, UK: Cambridge University Press. pp. 274–292. ISBN 978-1-107-42361-9.
- Polidoro, J. Richard; Simri, Uriel (May–June 1996). "The Games of 676 BC: A Visit to the Centenary of the Ancient Olympic Games". The Journal of Physical Education, Recreation & Dance. 67 (5). American Alliance for Health, Physical Education, Recreation and Dance: 41–46. doi:10.1080/07303084.1996.10607397.
- Potter, David Stone; Mattingly, D.J. (1999). Life, Death, and Entertainment in the Roman Empire. Ann Arbor: University of Michigan Press. ISBN 0-472-08568-9.
- Potter, David Stone (2006). A Companion to the Roman Empire. Blackwell Publishing. ISBN 0-631-22644-3.
- Prudames, David (5 January 2005). "Roman Chariot-Racing Arena Is First to Be Unearthed in Britain". Culture 24.
- Ramsay, William Wardlaw (1876). "Games of the Circus". A Manual of Roman Antiquities. London: Charles Griffin and Company.
- Scullard, Howard Hayes (1981). Festivals and Ceremonies of the Roman Republic. Ithaca, NY: Cornell University Press. ISBN 0-8014-1402-4.
- Treadgold, Warren T. (1997). "The Refoundation of the Empire, 284–337". A History of the Byzantine State and Society. Stanford, CA: Stanford University Press. ISBN 0-8047-2630-2.
- Valettas, G.M.; Ioannis, Passas (1945–1955). "Chariot Racing". Encyclopedia "The Helios" (in Greek). Vol. III. Athens.
- Vikatou, Olympia (2007). "Hippodrome of Olympia – Description". Hellenic World Heritage Monuments. Hellenic Ministry of Culture.
