= Edinburgh Readings on the Ancient World =

The cover of Greek Athletics, edited by Jason König.

The Edinburgh Readings on the Ancient World is a book series that aims to provide an introduction to key themes in the history of the ancient world. The series is published by Edinburgh University Press. Each volume takes the form of an introduction by a specialist in the field followed by translations of primary sources, explanations of key terms and other material.

== Titles ==
- Sparta, Michael Whitby, 2001. ISBN 9780748612949
- Greeks And Barbarians, Thomas Harrison, 2001. ISBN 9780748612703
- The Ancient Economy, Walter Scheidel and Sitta von Reden, 2002. ISBN 9780748613229
- Sex and Difference in Ancient Greece and Rome, Mark Golden and Peter Toohey, 2003. ISBN 9780748613199
- Roman Religion, Clifford Ando, 2003. ISBN 9780748615650
- Athenian Democracy, P.J. Rhodes, 2004. ISBN 9780748616862
- The Athenian Empire, Polly Low, 2008. ISBN 9780748625857
- Augustus, Jonathan Edmondson, 2009. ISBN 9780748615940
- Greek Athletics, Jason König, 2010. ISBN 9780748634903
- Augustus, Jonathan Edmondson, 2014. ISBN 9780748615957
