= Sinclair Bell =

American art historian

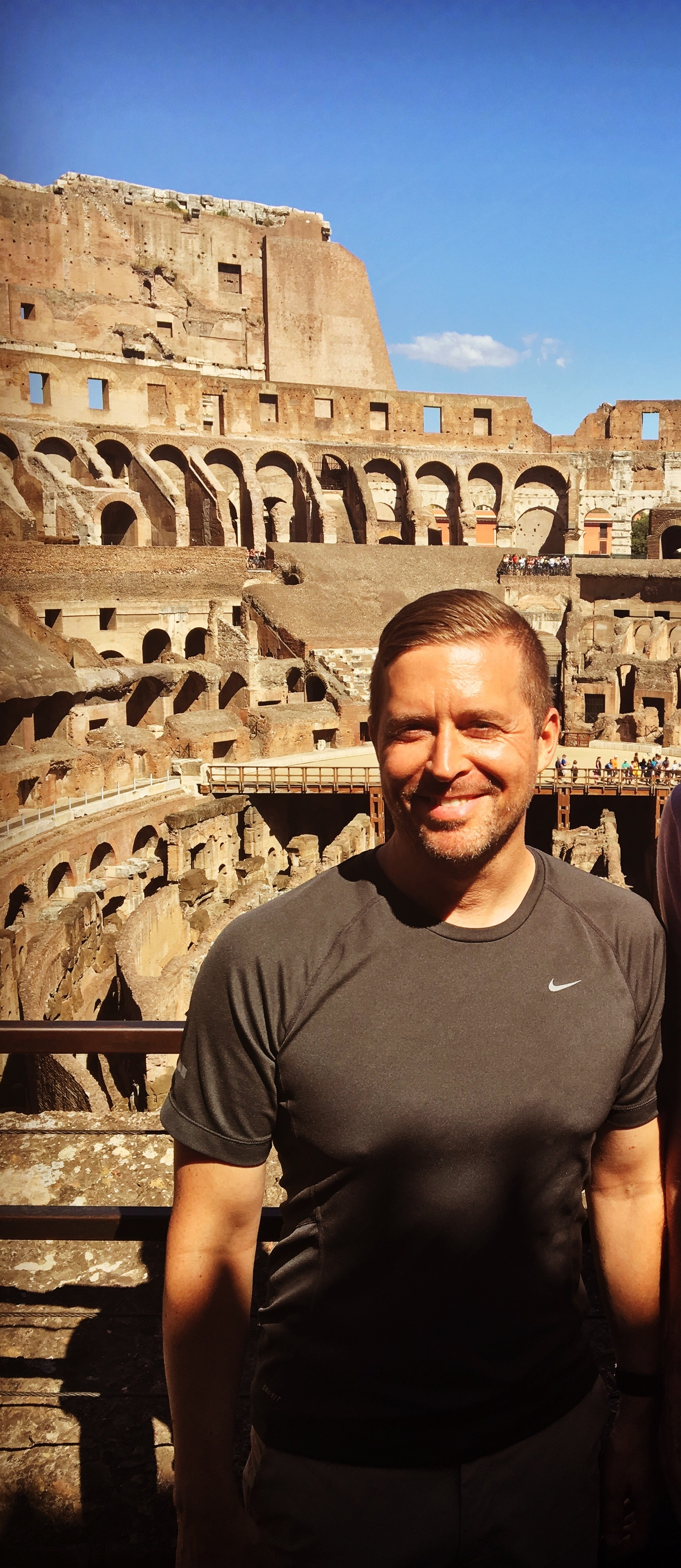

Academic background
- Education: B.A., Classical Studies and History, 1995 Wake Forest University; M.St., Classical Archaeology, 1997 University of Oxford; M.Sc, Classical Archaeology, 1999 University of Edinburgh; Matriculated Student, 2001 University of Cologne, PhD, Classics, 2004, University of Edinburgh

Academic work
- Institutions: Northern Illinois University
- Website: https://niu.academia.edu/SinclairBell

Sinclair Wynn Bell is an American classical archaeologist and art historian. He is a Presidential Research, Scholarship, & Artistry Professor (2026-2030), Distinguished Teaching Professor, and Professor of Art History at Northern Illinois University where he teaches courses in Egyptian, Greek, Etruscan, and Roman art history, architecture, and archaeology, as well as museum studies. His research focuses on the art and archaeology of the Etruscans; sport and spectacle in the Roman imperial period, especially the Roman circus; and slavery in ancient Rome, especially the material documentation and visual representation of slaves, freed persons, and foreigners in Roman art.

== Early life and education ==
Bell earned his Bachelor of Arts degree in Classical Studies and History from Wake Forest University, where he was a student of Allen Mandelbaum. He completed his graduate work in Classical Art and Archaeology at the University of Oxford, the University of Edinburgh, and the University of Cologne. During his graduate work, Bell was the recipient of a Postgraduate Fellowship from the Deutscher Akademischer Austauschdienst (2001-2) to study with Prof. Henner von Hesberg at the Archaeological Institute at the University of Cologne, as well as a Dorothy and Lewis B. Cullman Pre-Doctoral Rome Prize Fellowship in Ancient Studies at the American Academy in Rome (2002-3).

== Career ==
Bell joined the Art History department faculty at Northern Illinois University as an assistant professor in 2008, was promoted to associate professor in 2012, and to professor in 2020. During the 2010–11 academic year, Bell was named a “Research Ambassador” to the Deutscher Akademischer Austauschdienst. In 2020, he was named a Presidential Teaching Professor, which "were established in 1991 to recognize and support faculty who excel in the practice of teaching" at Northern Illinois University. In 2023, he was named the 2024 recipient of the Excellence in Undergraduate Teaching Award from the Archaeological Institute of America.

Bell has co-edited nearly 20 volumes, including a book with Teresa Ramsby on freed slaves in ancient Rome Free at Last! The Impact of Freed Slaves on the Roman Empire and with Alexandra Carpino A Companion to the Etruscans. Bell was selected for a three-year term as the Editor of the journal the Memoirs of the American Academy in Rome.

He has received numerous postdoctoral grants and fellowships in support of his research, including a postdoctoral fellowship in Roman archaeology at the University of Manitoba (2007-8), the Howard Fellowship from the George A. and Eliza Gardner Howard Foundation (2013), the Richard D. Cohen Fellowship from the Hutchins Center for African and African American Research at Harvard University (2019), and a Fellowship from the National Endowment for the Humanities (2021). He also appeared as a presenter in a documentary on the Smithsonian Channel, "Rome's Chariot Superstar" which was based in part on his dissertation research.

He was elected a Fellow of the Society of Antiquaries of London in 2023.

== Selected publications ==
- Roman Copies, Collecting, and Culture in the Bay of Naples and Beyond: Papers in Honor of Eugene Dwyer, co-edited with Brad Hostetler. Oxford: Archaeopress, 2026.
- The Spectacle of Everyday Life in the Roman Empire: Sport and Spectacula in Art, Architecture and Social Practice, co-edited with Nathan Elkins. Berlin: De Gruyter, 2026.
- Un public ou des publics? La réception des spectacles dans le monde romain entre pluralité et unanimité, co-edited with Anne Berlan-Gallant and Sylvain Forichon. Bordeaux: Ausonius Editions, 2024.
- Freed Persons in the Roman World: Status, Diversity, and Representation, co-edited with Dorian Borbonus and Rose MacLean. New York: Cambridge University Press, 2024.
- Brill’s Companion to the Reception of Vitruvius, co-edited with Ingrid D. Rowland. Leiden: Brill, 2024.
- The Running Centaur: Horse-Racing in Global-Historical Perspective, co-edited with Christian Jaser and Christian Mann. London: Taylor & Francis, 2021.
- Memoirs of the American Academy in Rome, Vol. 65 (2020).
- Roman Law before the Twelve Tables: An Interdisciplinary Approach, co-edited with Paul du Plessis. Edinburgh: The University of Edinburgh Press, 2020.
- Horse Racing in Global Historical Perspective, co-edited with Christian Jaser and Christian Mann. [=The International Journal of the History of Sport 37:3-4.] London: Routledge, 2020.
- Child, Family, and Ancient Society: Papers in Honour of Mark Golden, co-edited with Pauline Ripat. (Mouseion. Journal of the Classical Association of Canada 15.3) Toronto: University of Toronto Press, 2019.
- Memoirs of the American Academy in Rome, Vol. 63/64 (2018/19).
- At the Crossroads of Greco-Roman History, Culture and Religion: Papers in Memory of Carin M.C. Green, co-edited with Lora Holland. Oxford: Archaeopress, 2018.
- Sport and Social Identity in Classical Antiquity: Papers in Honour of Mark Golden, co-edited with Pauline Ripat. (Bulletin of the Institute of Classical Studies 61–1.) Malden, MA: Wiley-Blackwell, 2018.
- A Companion to the Etruscans, co-edited with Alexandra Carpino. Malden, MA: Wiley-Blackwell, 2016.
- Free at Last! The Impact of Freed Slaves on the Roman Empire, co-edited with Teresa Ramsby. London: Bloomsbury, 2012.
- New Perspectives on Etruria and Early Rome, co-edited with Helen Nagy. (Wisconsin Studies in Classics Series). Madison: The University of Wisconsin Press, 2009.
- Role Models in the Roman World: Identity and Assimilation, co-edited with Inge Lyse Hansen. (Memoirs of the American Academy in Rome Supplementary volume; VII). Ann Arbor: University of Michigan Press, 2008.
- Games and Festivals in Classical Antiquity, co-edited with Glenys Davies. (BAR International Series 1220). Oxford: Archaeopress, 2004.
