= Sitta von Reden =

German ancient historian and university teacher

Professor Sitta von Reden
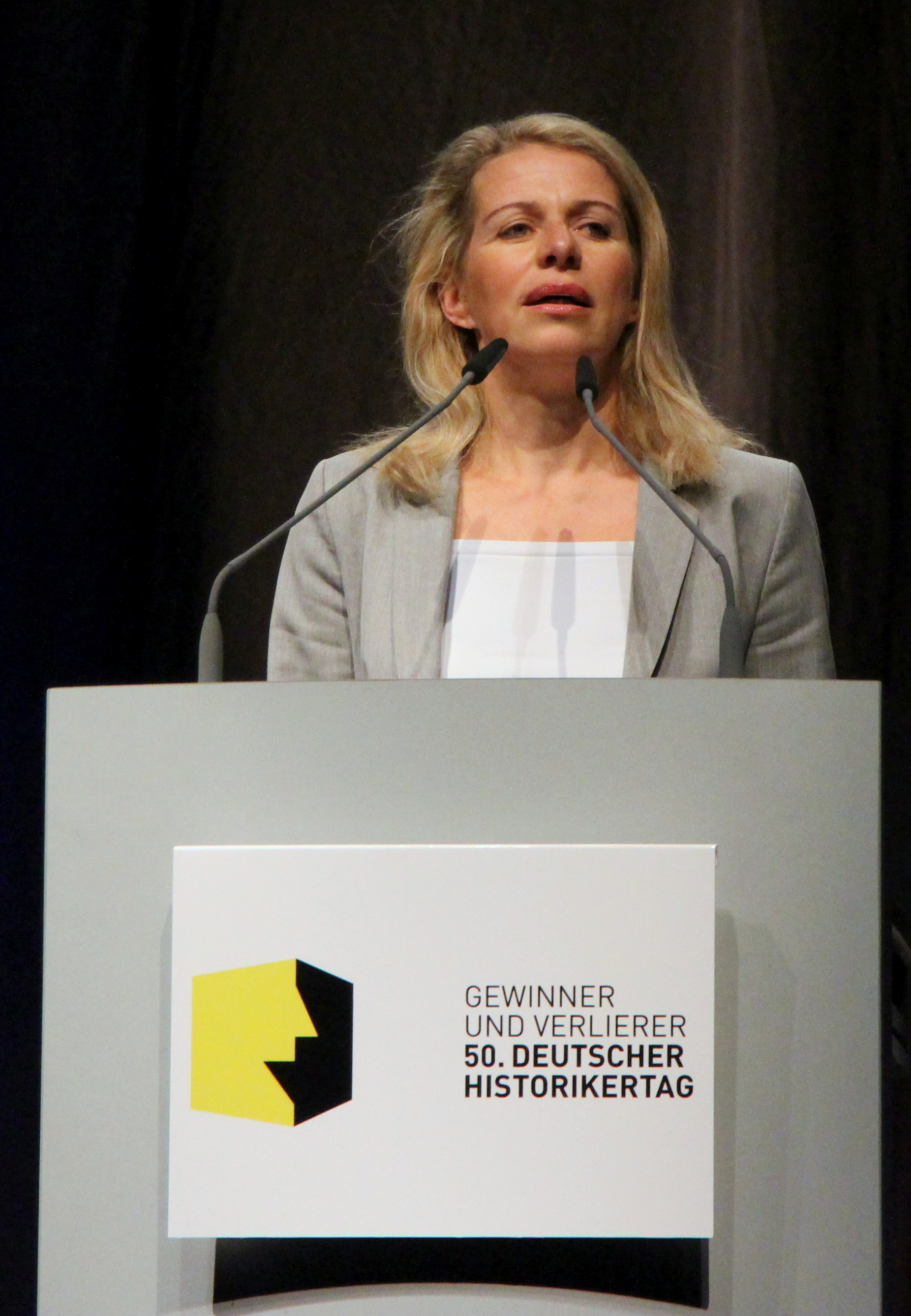
- Von Reden at the 50th German Historians' Day 2014 in Göttingen.
- Born: 1962 (age 63–64); Hannover

Academic background
- Education: University of Freiburg, Free University of Berlin, University of Cambridge
- Thesis: Monetization in 3rd -century BC Egypt

Academic work
- Discipline: Ancient History
- Institutions: University of Augsburg, University of Münster, LMU Munich, Institute for Advanced Study in Princeton, New Jersey, University of Freiburg

Sitta von Reden (born 1962 in Hannover) is a German ancient historian and Professor of Ancient History at the Albert-Ludwigs-Universität, Freiburg. She is particularly known for her research on ancient economics, and the social and cultural history of the Graeco-Roman world.

== Education ==
Von Reden studied economics and history at the University of Freiburg (graduating in 1987), and then studied Classical Philology and History at the Free University of Berlin and the University of Cambridge. Von Reden received her doctorate in Ancient History at the University of Cambridge. She was Junior Research Fellowship at The Queen's College, Oxford. The dissertation, completed in 1993, was awarded by the Hellenic Foundation in Oxford.

== Career ==
Following several years of teaching and research at various British universities, von Reden habilitated in 2005 at the University of Augsburg with the thesis Monetization in 3rd-century BC Egypt, and she subsequently taught Ancient History at the University of Augsburg, the University of Münster, and LMU Munich. From 2013 to 2014, von Reden was based at the Institute for Advanced Study in Princeton, New Jersey.

Since April 1, 2010, von Reden has been Professor of Ancient History with a focus on Greek History at the University of Freiburg. She currently holds the position of Dean at the University College Freiburg.

Von Reden's 2010 publication, Money in Classical Antiquity, has been described as "admirable introduction to some of the main themes in current debates on the use of money in the Classical world".

In March 2017, Reden received an Advanced Grant from the European Research Council (ERC) for her project Beyond the Silk Road, endowed with €2.5 million. This eventually resulted in the publication of Handbook of Ancient Afro-Eurasian Economies in three volumes during the period 2020–2023 with von Reden as editor.

== Publications ==
- 1995. Exchange in Ancient Greece. Duckworth, London, ISBN 0-7156-2600-0.
- 1998. Paul Cartledge, Paul Millett, Sitta von Reden (ed.): Kosmos: Essays in Order, Conflict and Community in Classical Athens. Cambridge University Press, Cambridge, ISBN 0-521-57081-6.
- 2002. Walter Scheidel, Sitta von Reden (ed.): The Ancient Economy. Edinburgh University Press, Edinburgh, ISBN 0-7486-1322-6.
- 2007. Money in Ptolemaic Egypt. Cambridge University Press, Cambridge, ISBN 978-0-521-85264-7.
- 2010. Money in Classical Antiquity. Cambridge University Press, Cambridge.
- 2015. Die Antike Wirtschaft. (= Encyclopedia of Greco-Roman Antiquity, Volume 10). de Gruyter Oldenbourg, Berlin et al. ISBN 978-3-486-85262-2.
- 2016. Money and Prices in the Papyri, Ptolemaic Period. Oxford Handbooks Online doi:10.1093/oxfordhb/9780199935390.013.71
- 2020–2023. Sitta von Reden (ed.): Handbook of Ancient Afro-Eurasian Economies (3 Volumes). de Gruyter Oldenbourg.
