= Mark Golden =

Canadian academic (1948–2020)

- Born: August 6, 1948
- Died: April 9, 2020 (aged 71)
- Education: University of Toronto
- Occupations: Classicist and Historian
- Employer(s): University of Winnipeg, Classics Department

Mark Golden (August 6, 1948 – April 9, 2020) was a Canadian academic. At the time of his death he was professor emeritus in the Department of Classics at the University of Winnipeg. Golden received his BA, MA, and PhD all from University of Toronto. In 1998 he was the recipient of the Erica and Arnold Rogers Award for Research Excellence. He wrote several books on the history of childhood, sexuality and sport in the ancient world.

== Selected publications ==
- Children and Childhood in Classical Athens, Johns Hopkins University Press, 1990. (2nd 2015)
- Inventing Ancient Culture: Historicism, Periodization and the Ancient World, Routledge, London, 1997. (edited with Peter Toohey) ISBN 0415099609
- Sport and Society in Ancient Greece, Cambridge University Press, Cambridge, 1998. (Key Themes in Ancient History)
- Sex and Difference in Ancient Greece and Rome, Edinburgh University Press, Edinburgh, 2003. (edited with Peter Toohey) ISBN 0748613196 (Edinburgh Readings on the Ancient World)
- Sport in the Ancient World from A to Z, Routledge, London, 2004.
- Greek Sport and Social Status, University of Texas Press, 2009. ISBN 0292718691 (Fordyce W. Mitchel Memorial Lecture Series)
- A Cultural History of Sexuality in the Classical World, Bloomsbury Academic, London, 2011. (edited with Peter Toohey) (The Cultural Histories Series)
