= Hysplex =

Ancient race-starting device

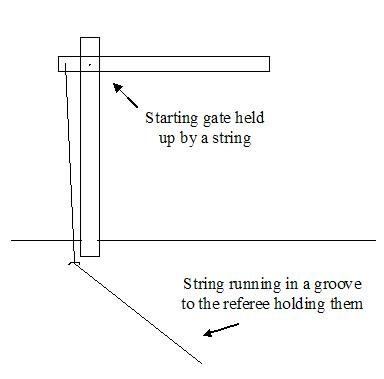
Hysplex

Hysplex (Greek: ὕσπληξ) is a starting gate used in ancient Greek horse and foot races. This device was set up at the starting line and consisted of an upright vertical bar that held a horizontal gate attached to it held up by a string. Each racer stood behind his own hysplex and all of the strings were centrally connected behind the runners, held by a referee. At the start of the race, the referee let go of all the strings; and consequently the starting gates fell at the same time, releasing the runners.

Originally, they probably used an auditory signal for the start of the race, which, however, the athletes seemed to ignore and start too soon. Therefore, the officials had to devise special mechanisms to ensure the fair start of the race. We know about the hysplex mechanism from depictions in surviving vases as well as from descriptions during the Hellenistic and Roman times. According to those sources, the hysplex were two horizontal stretched ropes at the height of the knees and the chest of the runners correspondingly. The end of the ropes was attached to two vertical poles that were not placed in the ground but on special mechanisms. The official would trigger the mechanism, the ropes would fall to the ground and the runners would spring onto the track.
