= Porphyrius the Charioteer =

Roman charioteer (born 480 AD)

Porphyrius (Greek: Πορφύριος) the Charioteer, also named Porphyrius Calliopas (AD c. 480 – after 538), was a celebrity Byzantine-Roman charioteer in the late 5th and early 6th century AD, during what the classicist Alan Cameron has described as the "golden age" of Byzantium's hippodrome, and of the Byzantine charioteer.

== Background ==
Christianisation of the Roman empire was accompanied by the abandonment of traditional Roman and Greek religious festivals and the banning of associated gladiator shows and other arena blood-sports; venationes (wild beast hunts in the arena) were banned in 498. Chariot racing and certain forms of what Cameron describes as Imperial ritual, theatrical dance or "pantomime" replaced most imperially funded public entertainments. In 502, the theatrical or pantomime component was banned as unruly, leaving only such Imperial ritual as belonged to the chariot races, in particular the salutation of the emperor and victorious charioteer.

== Career ==
Porphyrius was one of the most popular and celebrated charioteers of his day, with a forty-year career that probably spanned several cities of the Byzantine Empire. Seven transcriptions celebrating his achievements have been traced to the Hippodrome, the racetrack at the Byzantine Empire's capital, Constantinople. Each was once associated with the base of a bronze portrait statue of Porphyrius, mounted on the race-track's central division (in Latin, Euripus or spina). All traces of the statues are now lost. Two bases survive; their imagery and inscriptions, supplemented by ancient transcriptions from the five lost bases, offer a record of the changing status, roles and alliances of Byzantine charioteers and racing factions in general, and Pophyrius in particular.

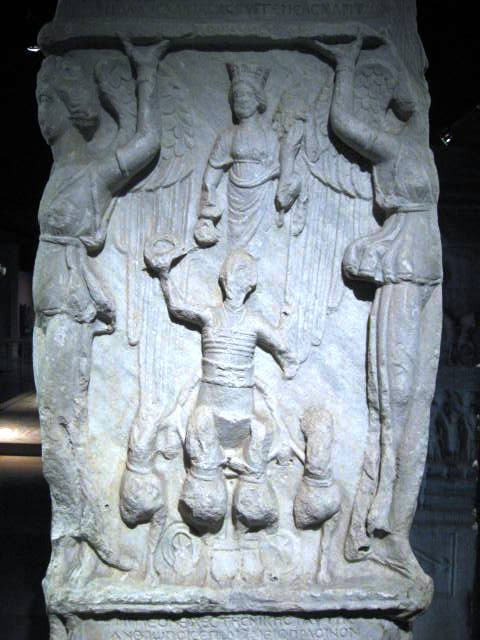
The upper half of a statue base awarded to Porphyrius by the Green faction. He holds a victor's crown aloft, and confronts the viewer head-on from his Quadriga; above him, a Tyche with cornucopia represents prosperity, security and probably his racing victories at Nicomedia for the Greens. The lower half of the base (see linked page) shows several dancers.

The incised Greek text on these two statuary bases, and ancient copies of the text on five others became part of the collection of epigrams, prose and poetry known as the Greek anthology. The Chronicle of John Malalas offers a different version of the text, presumed less reliable.

Porphyrius was born in Libya in 480 AD, the son of a certain Calchas, and brought up in Constantinople. He started his career quite young, in his early adolescence, and "he often changed factions and horses". In his later career, he adopted the name Porphyrius Calliopas.

The two surviving sculpted plinths from the hippodrome at Constantinople were awarded to Porphyrius early in his career. They are the second and fourth in an attested series of seven, each of which would originally have supported a bronze portrait statue of Porphyrius. The incised legends on the surviving plinths, and the copies that were made from the lost plinths when still in situ, provide a biography. The two plinths have much imagery in common. Cameron observes a similarity between their iconography and that of the Obelisk of Theodosius plinth, one side of which shows the emperor, surrounded by his court in uniform rows, using the same confronting gesture as Porphyrius, as if to offer the viewer a winner's wreath; the other faces of the Theodosius plinth show ranks of submissive barbarians, vanquished enemies, an illustration of the race itself, and a performance by musicians and dancers. Porphyrius' plinths are around 7 feet high, with cartouches of Greek text and stylised portrayals in high relief of Tyches, and the charioteer's factional supporters. Porphyrius himself stands in triumphant posture in his quadriga (four horse chariot), acknowledging his own victory and the adoration of his supporters. Cameron describes the figures as static, "stiff and ungainly", having no reference to the naturalistic imagery from the classical past. Porphyrius is the youngest known charioteer to have been honoured with monuments during his lifetime by both the Greens and the Blues – the two major, usually opposed factions – with the emperor's approval. Traditionally a charioteer would have a statue or other monument built after his retirement or death.

Porphyrius is described in his inscriptions as the best charioteer of his time; and as the only charioteer known to have won the diversium twice in one day. In a diversium, a winning charioteer won twice over, by driving to victory the horse team of an opponent he had only just defeated; a clear demonstration of the driver's skill. While Byzantine chariot racing was clearly based on Roman precedent in most respects, the diversium was entirely Byzantine.

Cameron believes that Porphyrius would have raced at several Eastern provincial capitals and major cities at various times during his career; he names Nicomedia and Berytus as likely venues. The only evidence for Porphyrius' activities beyond the Constantinople racetrack refers to his leadership of the Greens at Antioch, in 507, and their attack on a synagogue in the suburb of Daphne, in which many Jews were slaughtered. Cameron observes that "stars are notoriously temperamental, especially when fame comes early".

A fragment of Malalas' chronicle asserts that Porphyrius, as leader of the Greens, helped raise support for the ruling emperor, Anastasius during the general Vitalian's Revolt, and that subsequently the victorious and grateful Anastasius commissioned yet another Hippodrome statue of Porphyrius. Cameron allows for the possibility that Porphyrius fought in person for Anastasius, but also underlines Malalas' reputation as an unreliable historian; "a remarkably ill-informed and careless writer." Porphyrius retired from chariot-racing in his late 50s or 60s; his age at death is not known.
