= Circus of Antioch =

Ancient Roman circus in Antioch, Turkey

Coordinates: 36.226691°N 36.171743°E

The Circus of Antioch was a hippodrome in Antioch, in present-day Turkey. Used for chariot racing, it was modelled on the Circus Maximus in Rome and other circus buildings throughout the Roman Empire. It was one of the largest in the Roman Empire.

== Overview ==
The circus, measuring more than 490 m in length and 30 m of width, was similar to the Hippodrome of Berytus. The circus could house up to 80,000 spectators.

There is no consensus about the dating, as it was built and used for several years before its official dedication. It seems to have been built sometime around 50 BCE. By the late 7th century CE, it had become decrepit and was replaced by a new arena located nearby (less than 1/5 of a mile to the north); the new arena was called “Hippodrome B” or the “Palestra.”
