= Stadium of Philippopolis =

Ancient Roman stadium

Ancient stadium of Philippopolis
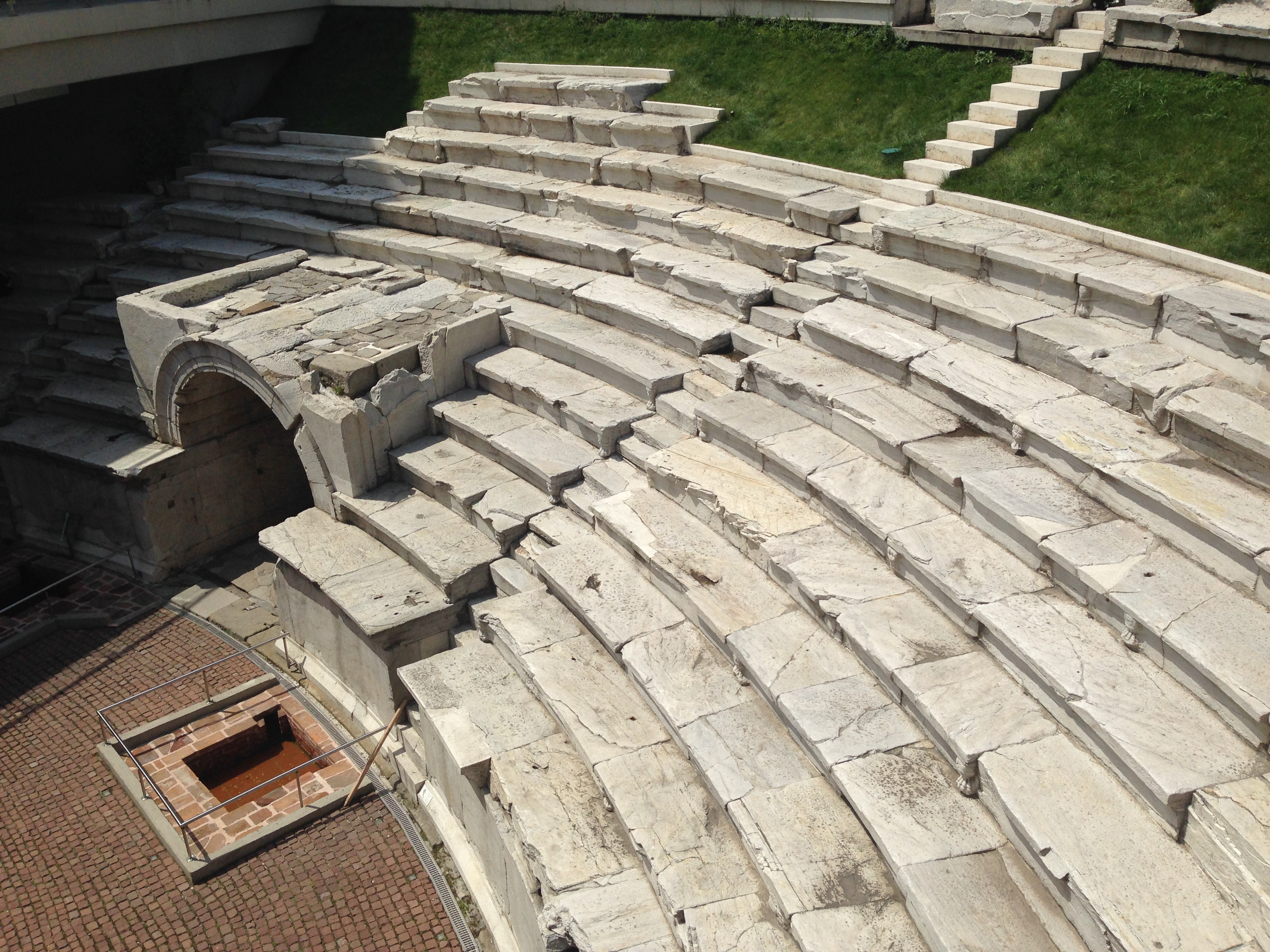
- The Ancient stadium in May 2012

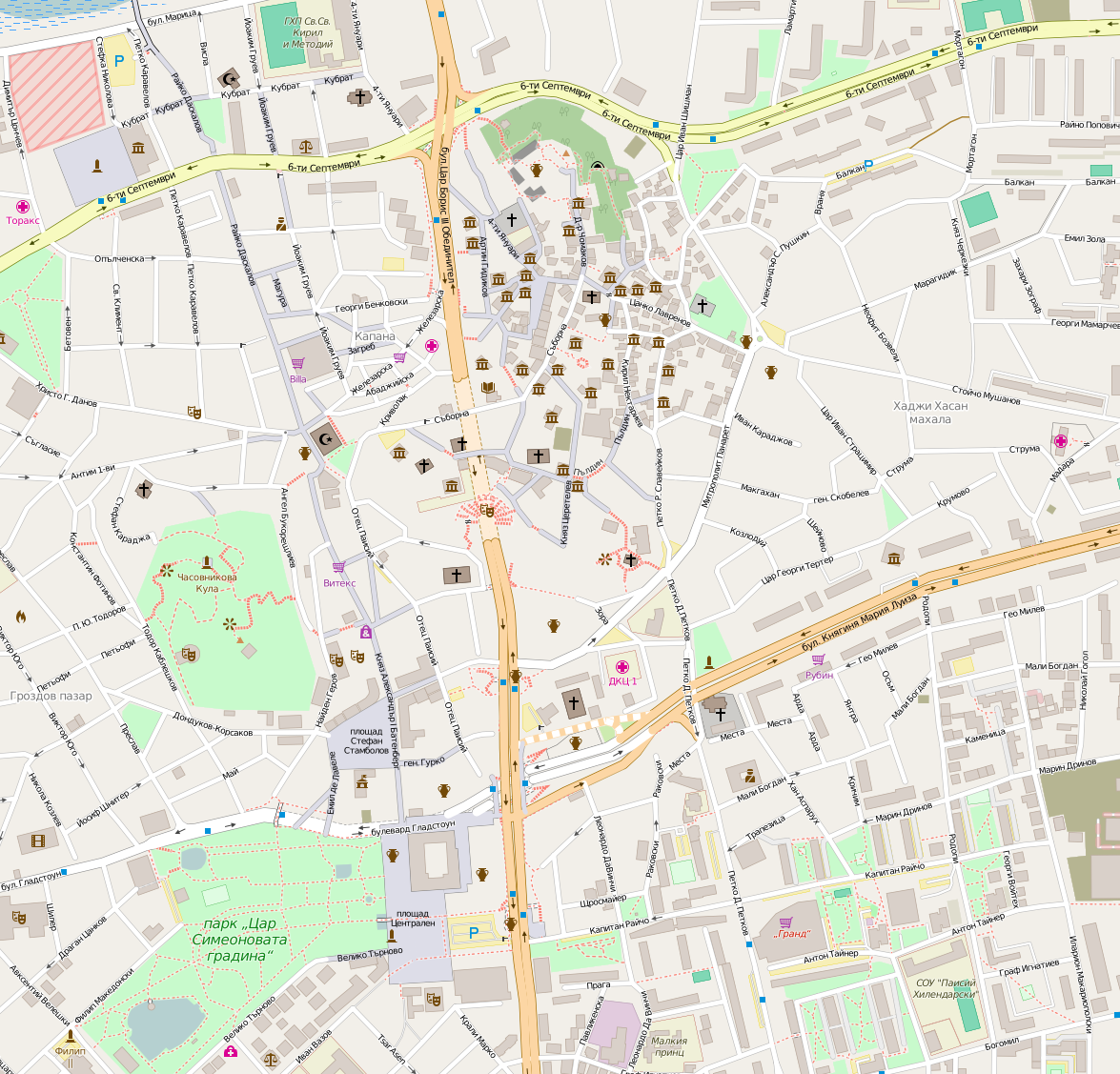
- Location within Plovdiv City Center
- 42.1475679°N 24.7480184°E
- Type: Stadium
- Periods: Roman Empire
- Location: Plovdiv, Bulgaria

History
- Built: 90s of the 1st century AD
- Built by: Hadrian

Site notes
- Material: bricks, marble
- Length: 250 m (820 ft)
- Width: 50 m (160 ft)
- Excavation dates: 1923, 1973 - 1977, 2004, 2006, 2010
- Archaeologists: D. Tsontcheva, Liliya Botusharova, Maya Martinova-Kyutova
- Condition: Restored
- Owner: Plovdiv Municipality
- Public access: Yes
- Website: http://ancient-stadium-plovdiv.eu/

The Stadium of Philippopolis was the ancient Roman stadium of Philippopolis (modern Plovdiv), built in the 2nd century AD, during the Roman imperial period. It is among the largest and best preserved buildings from the time of the Roman Empire in the Balkan Peninsula. At the time the stadium was built, Philippopolis was the capital of the Roman province of Thracia.

The stadium, approximately 250 m (820 ft) long and 50 m (160 ft) wide, could seat up to 30,000 spectators. Today, the northern curved part of the stadium (the sphendone) is partially restored and is one of the most recognisable landmarks of the city among the many preserved buildings from Roman times.

== Location ==
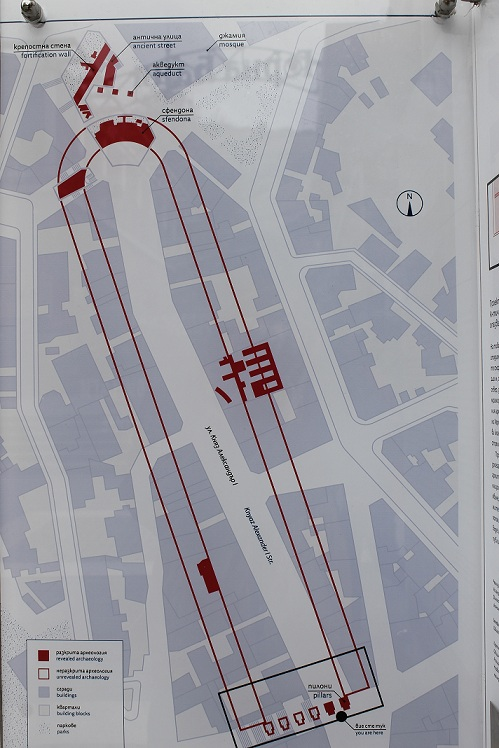
Stadium plan and excavations

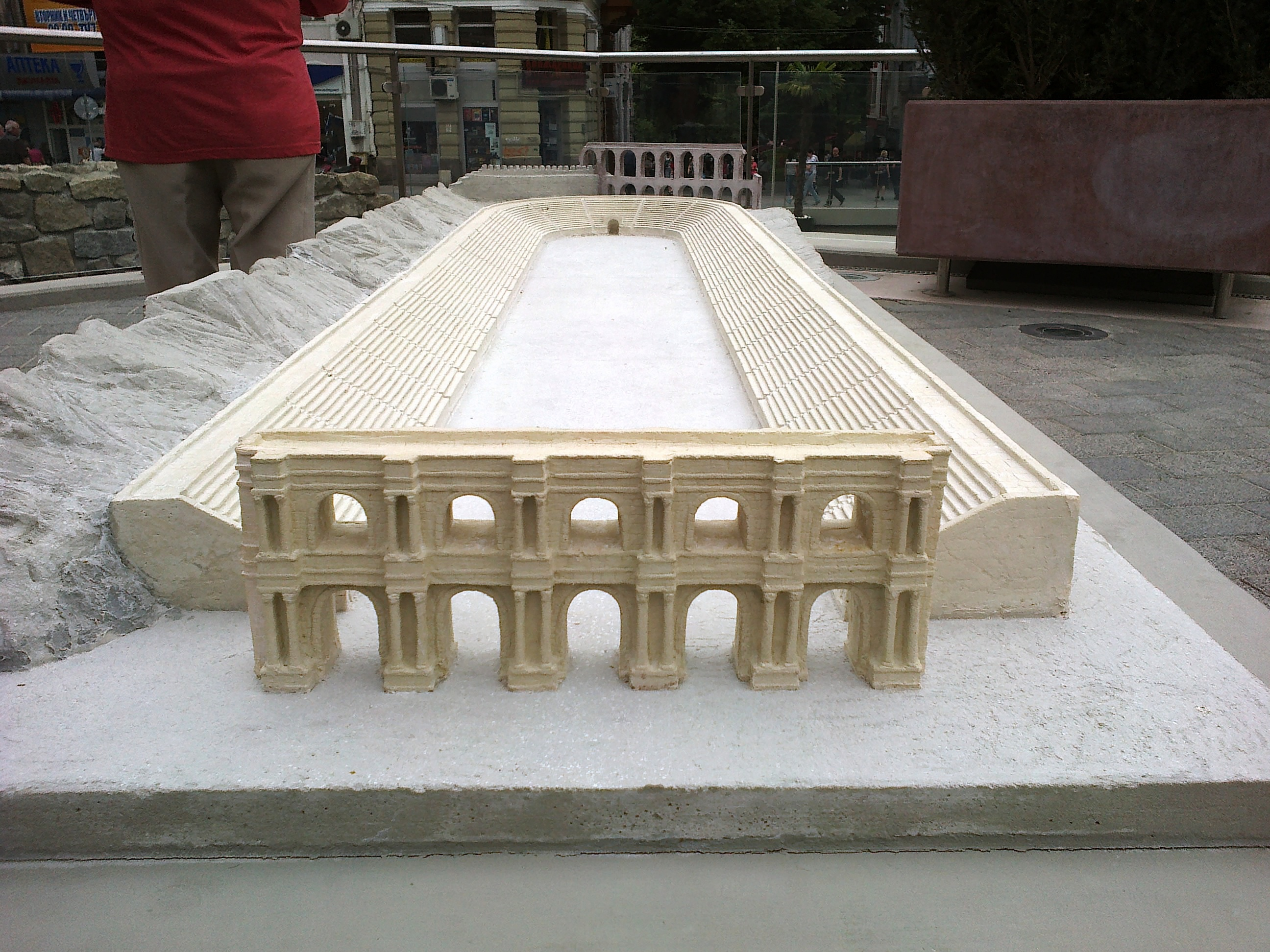
Model of the full size of stadium

Today, the stadium is located in the centre of Plovdiv, under the main pedestrian street. The northern end of the edifice can be observed at Dzhumayata Square. The larger portion still lies beneath the buildings along the main street, running south from the visible part where parts are visible in basements of several shops.

Unusually, it was situated within the fortified city close to the walls (most stadia elsewhere were placed outside the walls), in the natural bowl-shaped terrain between Taksim Tepe and Sahat Tepe.

== Architecture ==
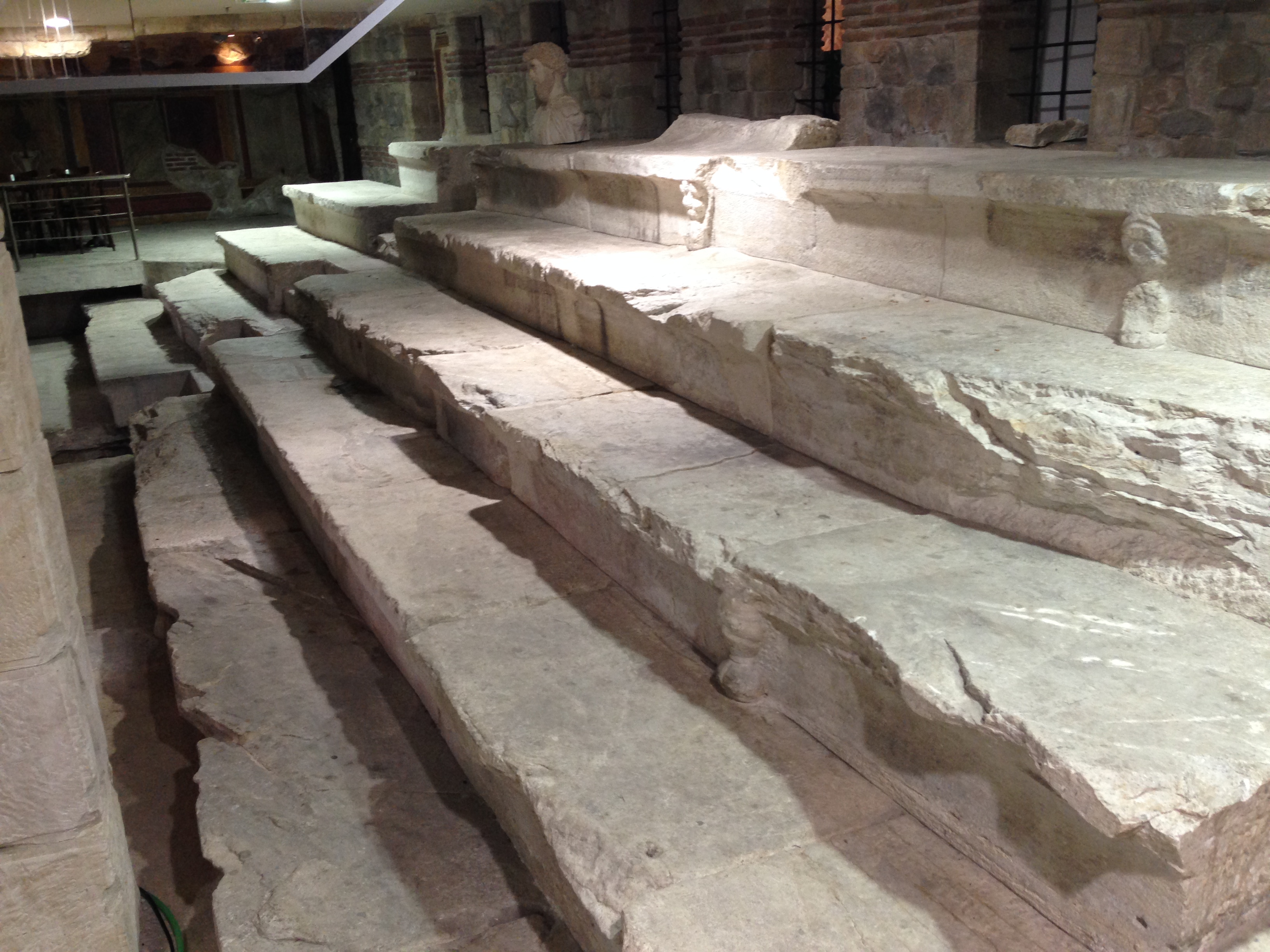
side of stadium in shopping centre basement

The stadium was built in the beginning of the 2nd century AD during the reign of the emperor Hadrian (r. 117–138). Approximately 240 m (790 ft) m long and 50 m wide, it could seat up to 30000 spectators. The length of the track is one stadion – 625 Roman feet or 600 Greek feet, or approximately 180 m (590 ft).

The spectators' seats are tiered in 14 rows, crossed by stepped aisles down to the track. The seats are made of solid marble blocks (40 cm high and 75 cm wide) and the front parts are decorated with stylized lion paws. The front part of the lowest row is revetted with massive marble 1.80-metre plates (orthostats) on solid marble blocks. The seats from the highest row had backrests.

Like the other imperial buildings for spectacular events, the stadium had its seats of honour (Latin: ima cavea) preserved by inscriptions in the marble blocks. Seats with Greek inscriptions were found, proving the existence of special seats for members of higher public position.

The outside walls of the cavea are built from granite ashlars, labelled with letters at some places. The architectural marble elements of the entrance and the orthostats on the front row were tied to each other with lead-set iron cramps. The main southern entrance to the stadium is formed by masonry pillars decorated with marble pilasters and reliefs. On the pilasters there are busts of Hermes (hermai) with prize vases decorated with palmettes placed above them, accompanied by the attributes of the god Heracles (the Roman Hercules) – his lion skin, club, and quiver. In front of the entrance a granite pavement was uncovered, consisting of hexagonal blocks – 0.70 by 0.70 m diagonally.

The northern curved part of the stadium is in situ in Dzhumaya Square. Also a covered vaulted passage under the tiered rows of seats (cavea) links the track with the outside Roman road next to the city walls.

In the 4th century AD this area was crossed by an ancient Roman aqueduct, the arch support of which remains.

== Games ==
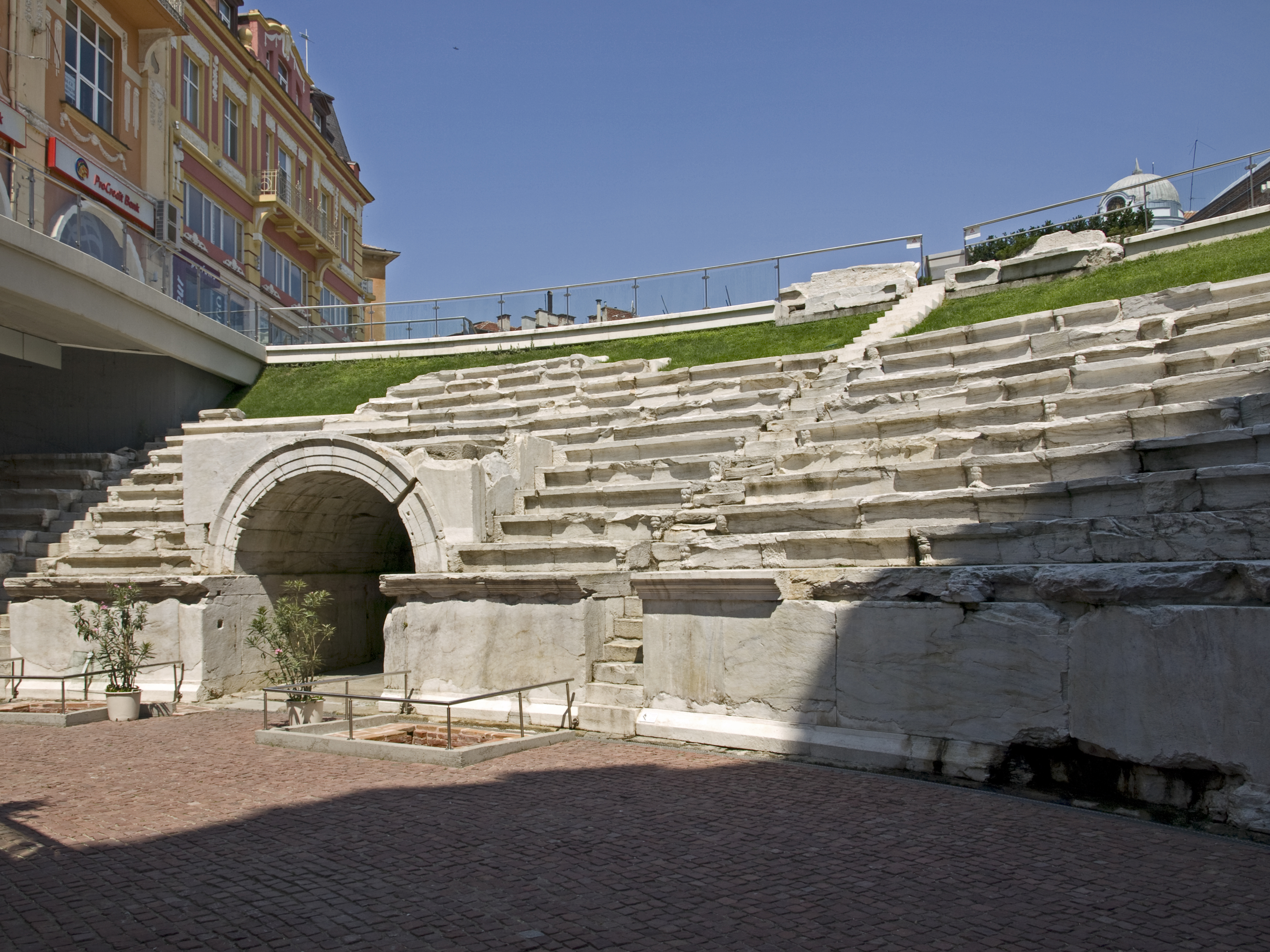
View from the stadium track

According to the epigraphic and numismatic monuments games similar to the Pythian Games in Greece were held in the town. To honour the visit of the Roman emperor Caracalla (r. 198–217) in 214, the games were called "Alexandrian" while the games for the visit of his successor Elagabalus (r. 218–222) in 218 were called "Kedrisian Games".

The games were organised by the General Assembly of the province of Thrace (Latin: Thracia). In their honour the royal mint of Trimontium coined money featuring the face of the ruling emperor as well as the types of athletic events held in the ancient stadium. A marble slab stone was found during the excavations of the sphendone, proving that there were games celebrating the deified lover of the emperor Hadrian – Antinous. The votive tablet dedicated to Antinous is exhibited in the Plovdiv Regional Archaeological Museum Plovdiv.

Athletes competed in two categories of age – men and boys. Agonothetes (organisers of the sport events) presided over the games. The latter started with a contest for criers and buglers. Sporting events were usually accompanied by music, poetry and art contests.

== Restoration and conservation ==
The stadium was discovered in 1923. More elaborate excavations were undertaken about half a century later by the archaeologist Liliya Botusharova.

In 1995 the stadium was listed as a cultural value of national significance.

In 2010–2013, the area around the stadium was further renovated.

Restoration of the stadium (1970s)

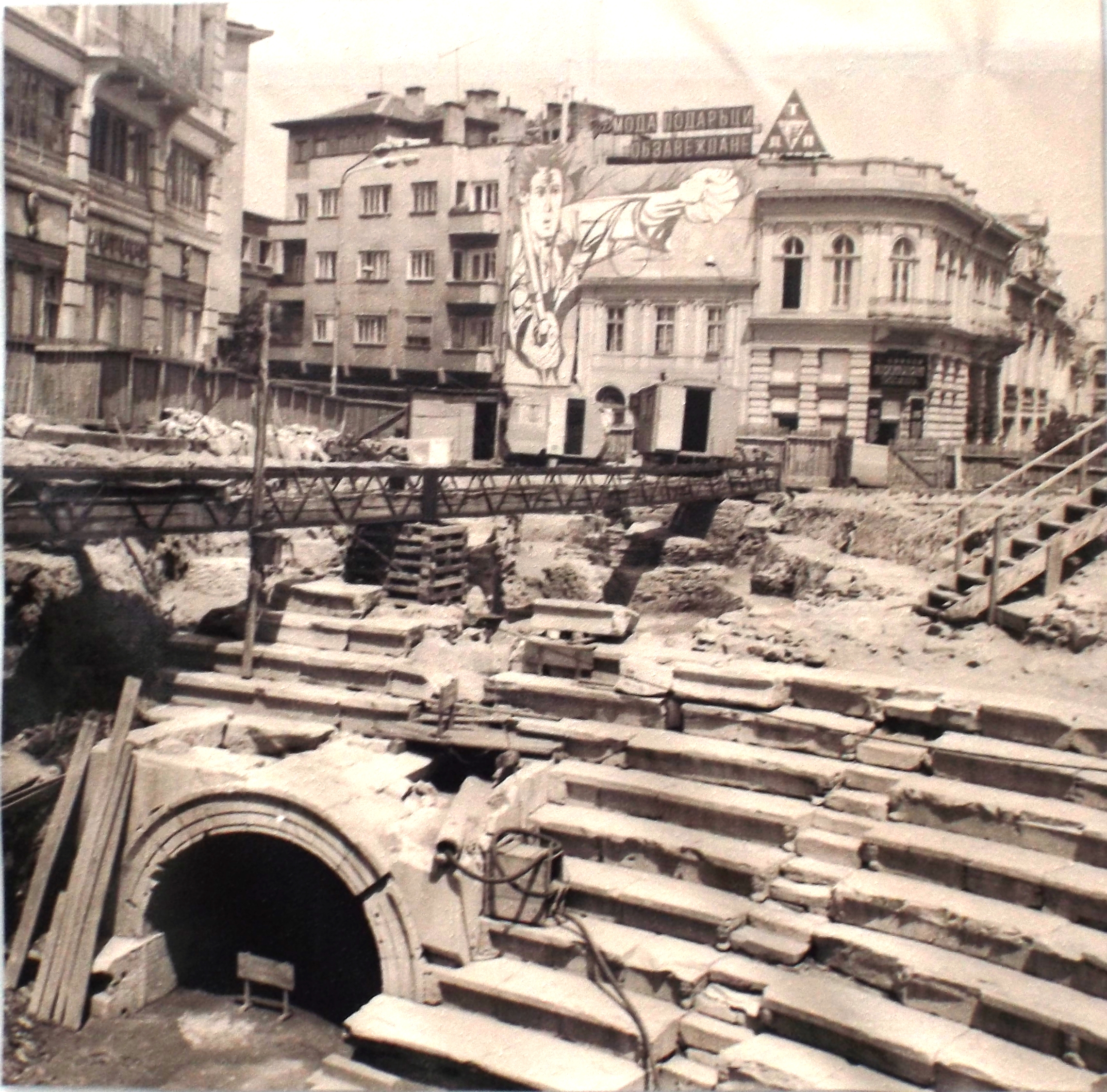

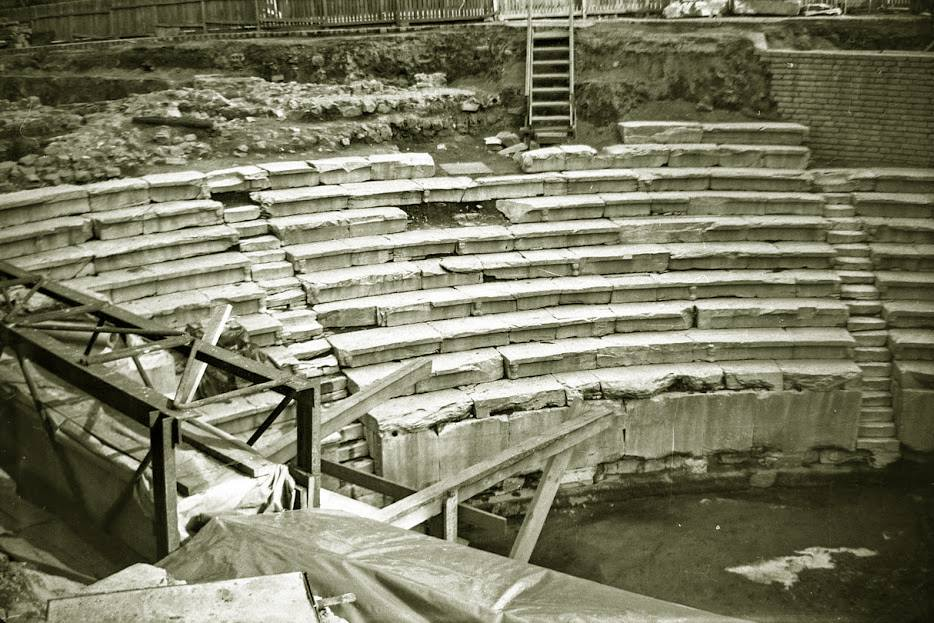

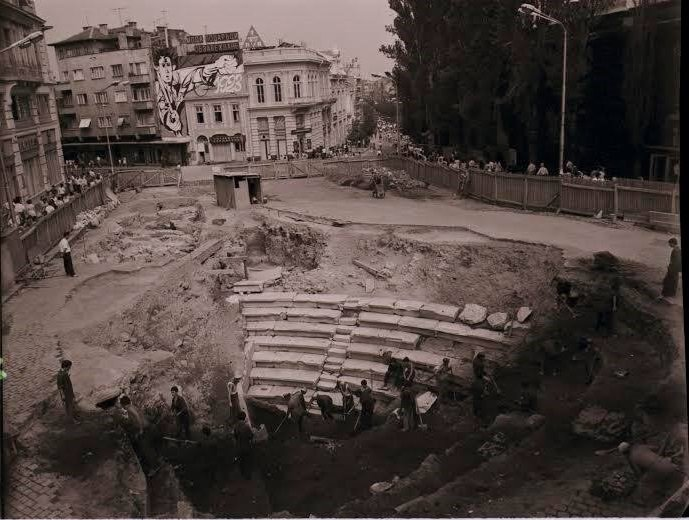

== Gallery ==
The Ancient Stadium

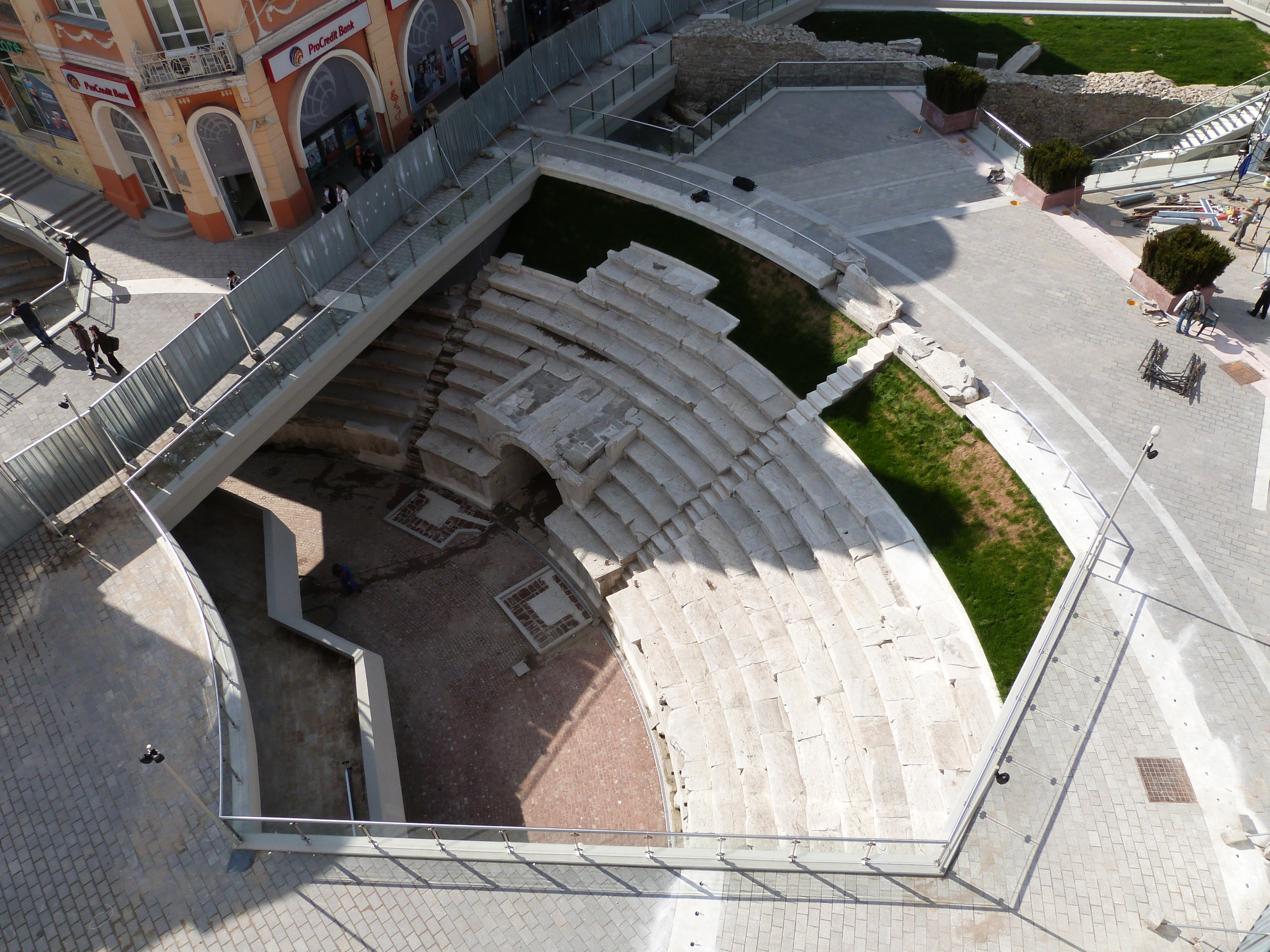
Dzhumaya square and the remains of the sphendone – view from above

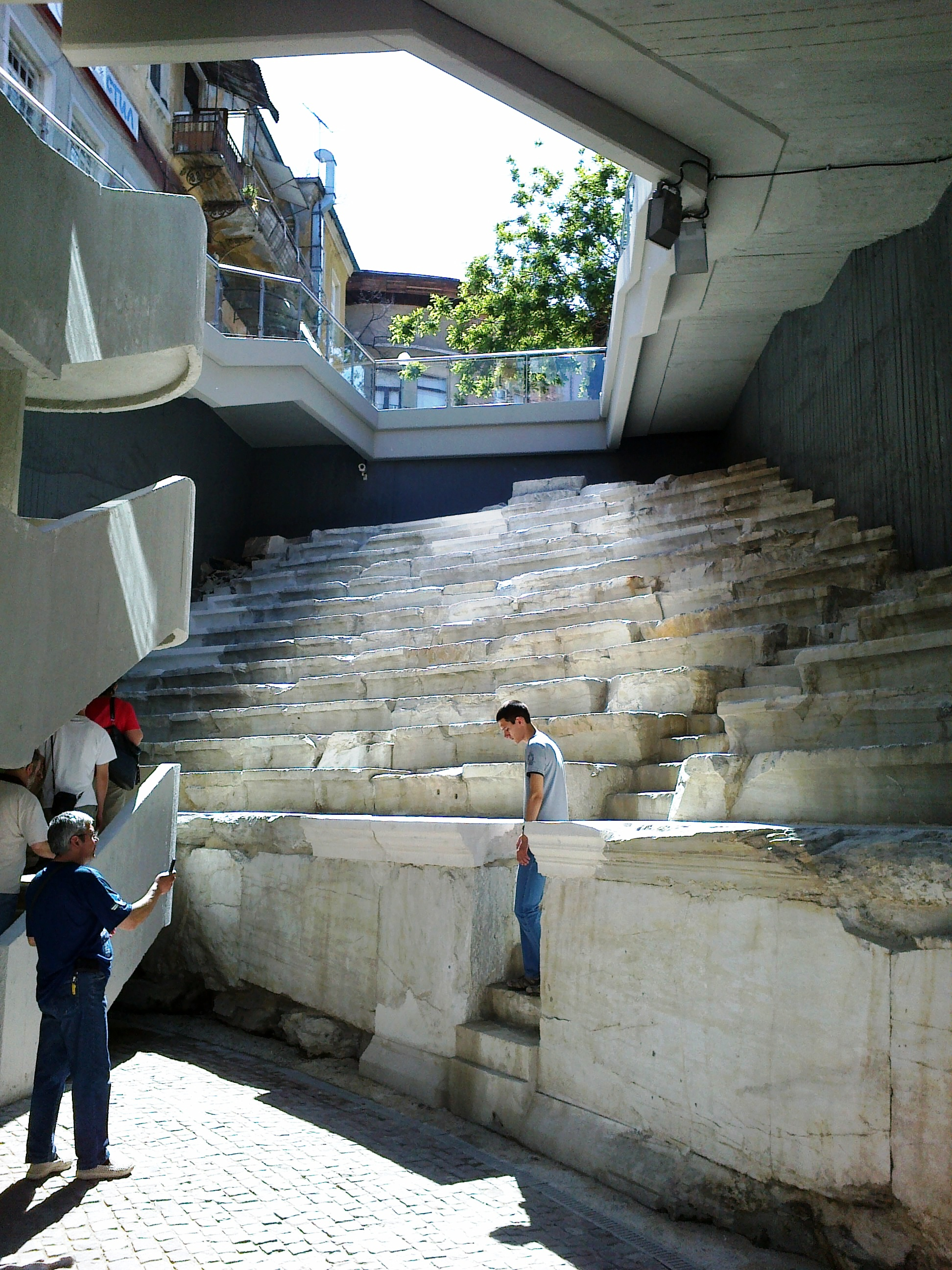
Part of the sphendone

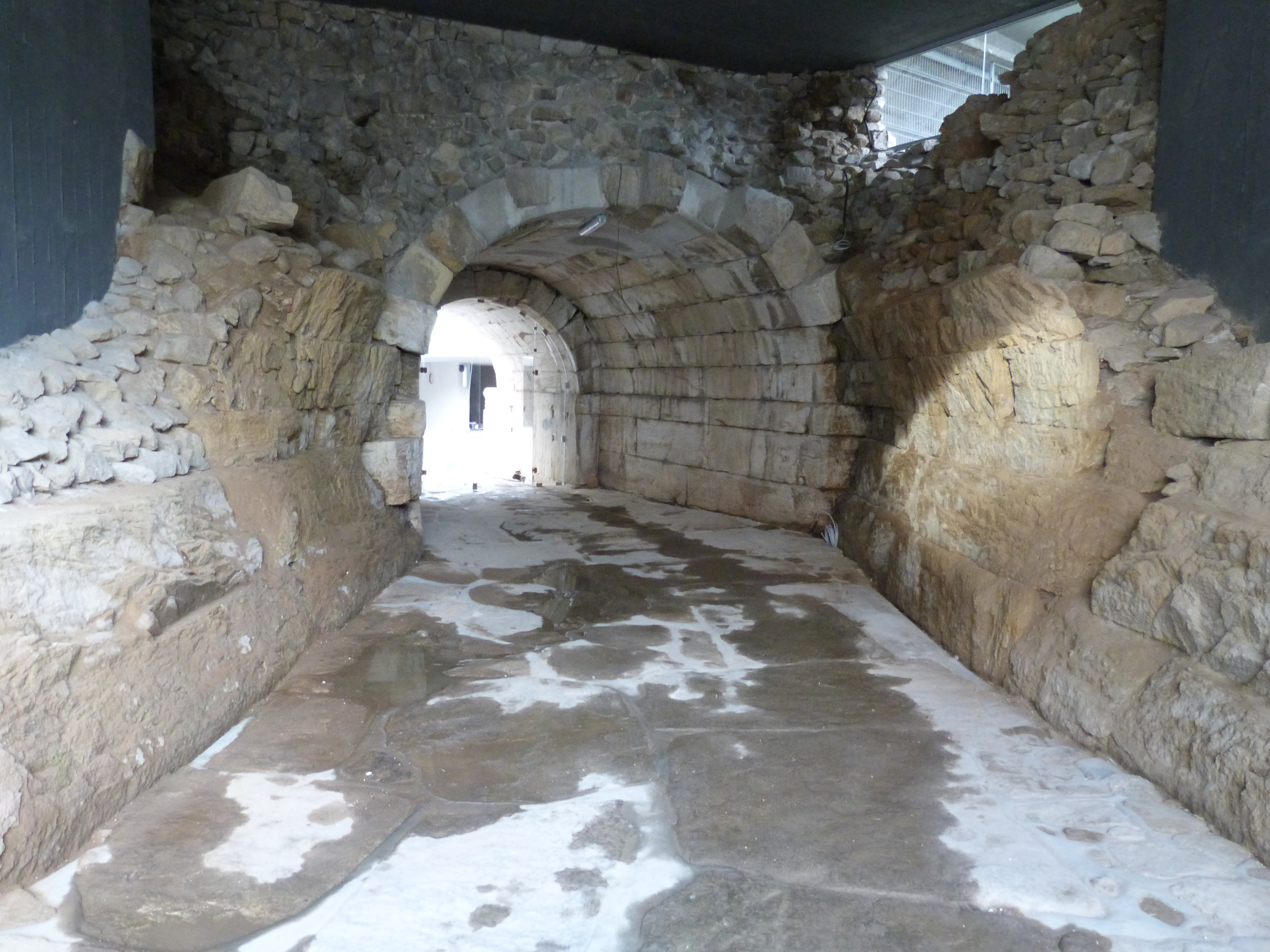
The vaulted passage-street under the sphendone

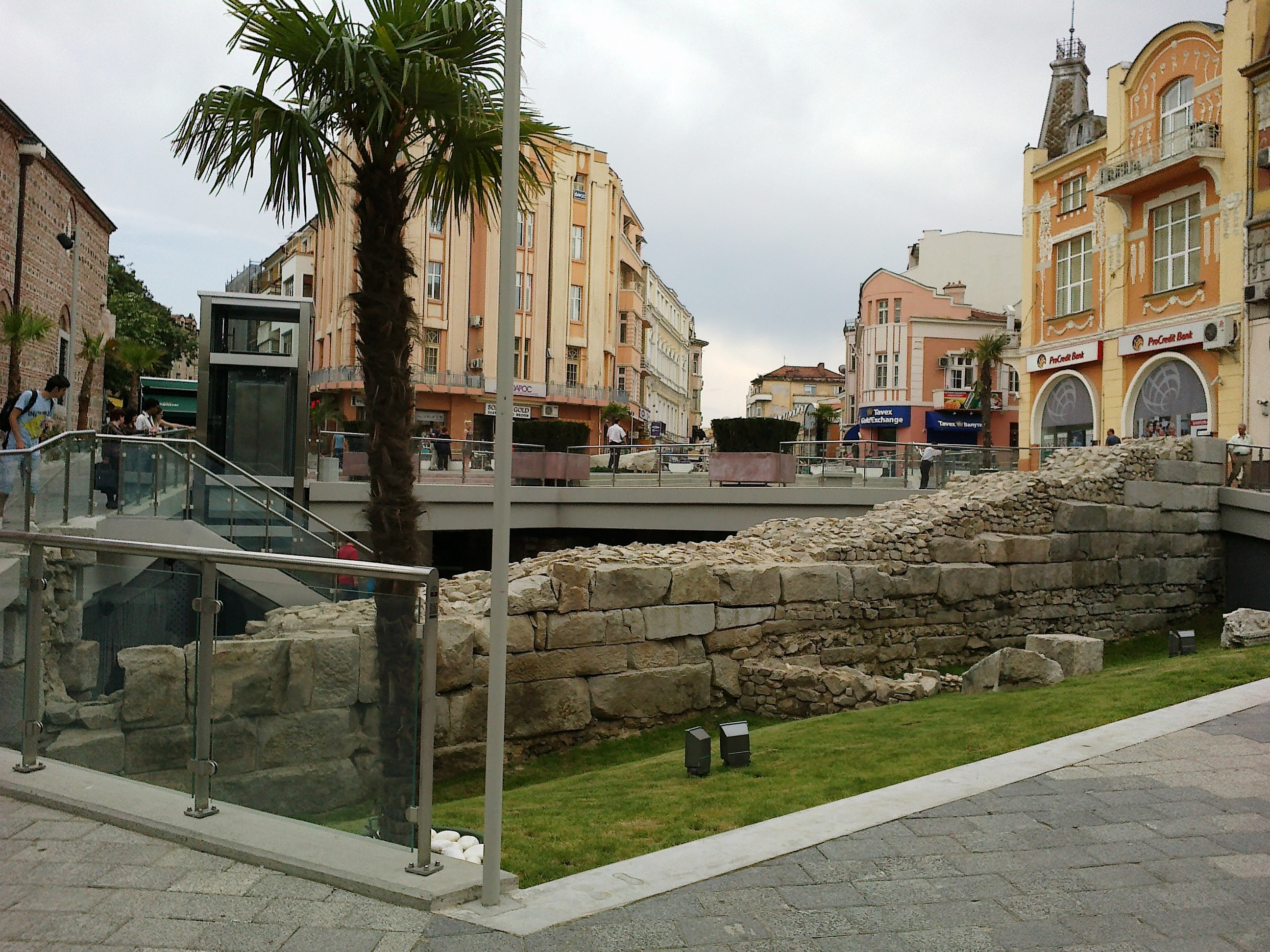
Dzhumaya square – view from the north towards the city wall and the main pedestrian street

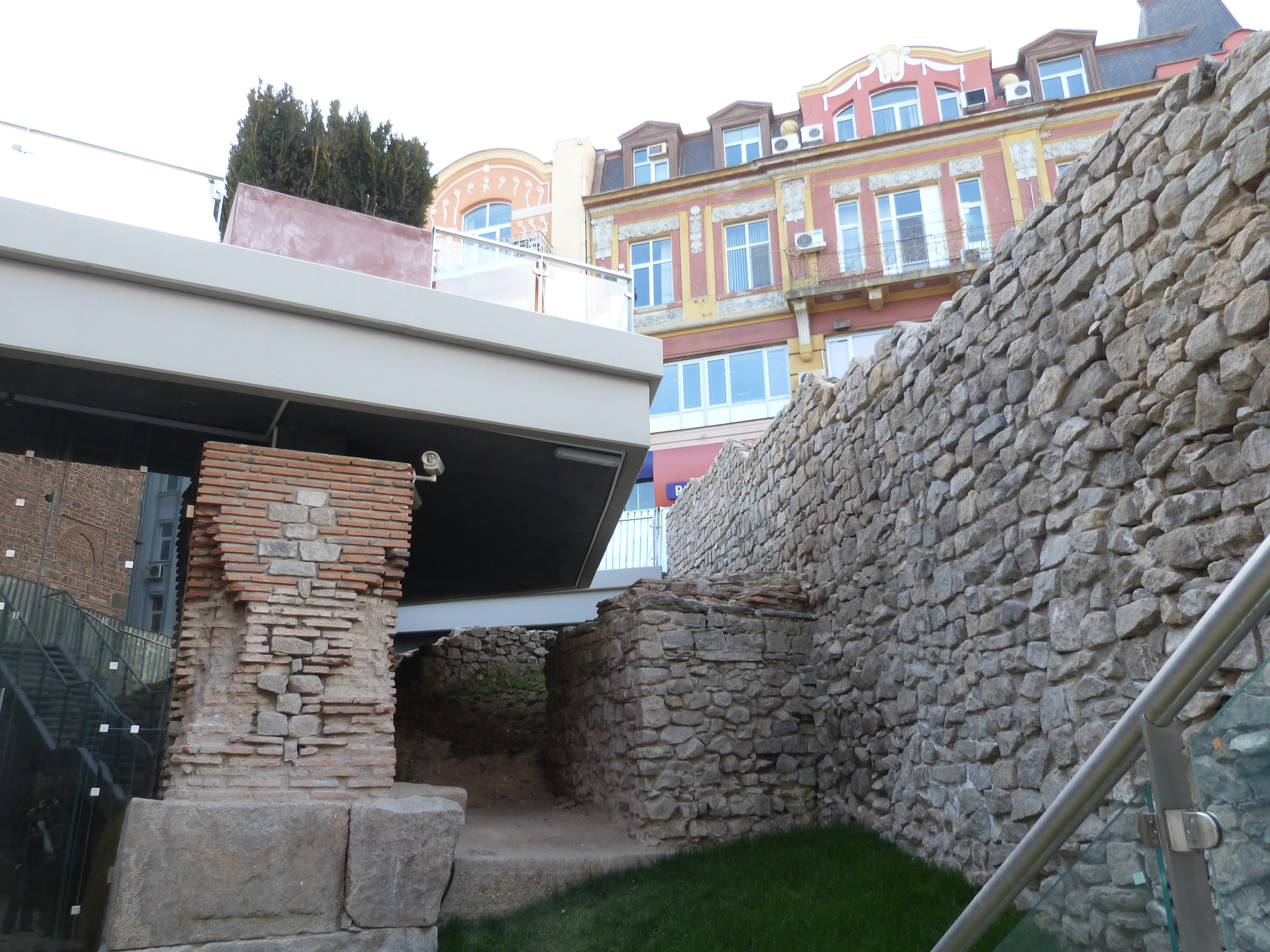
Pillars of the aqueduct and the fortification wall

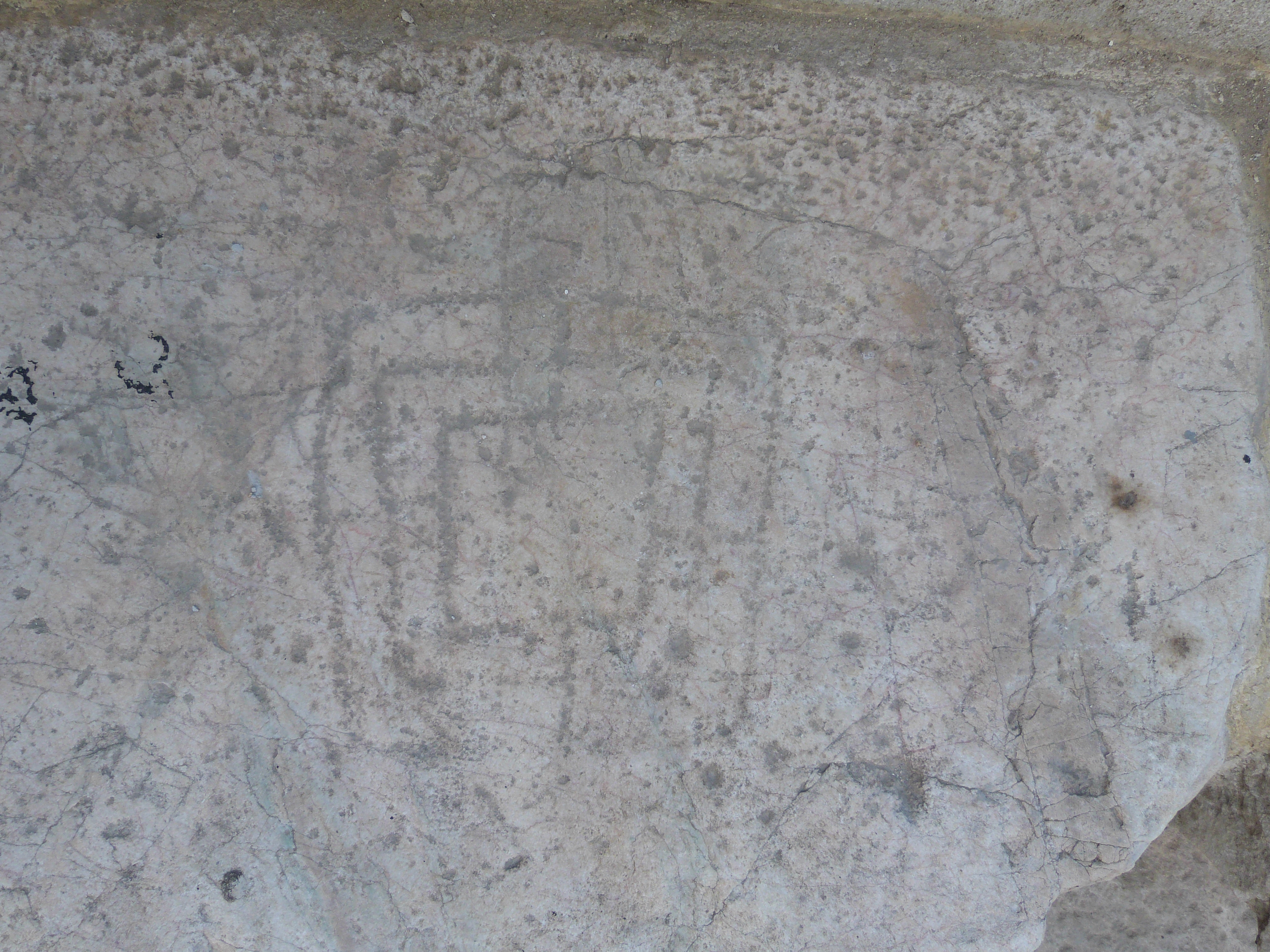
Detail of a signed seat at the sphendone

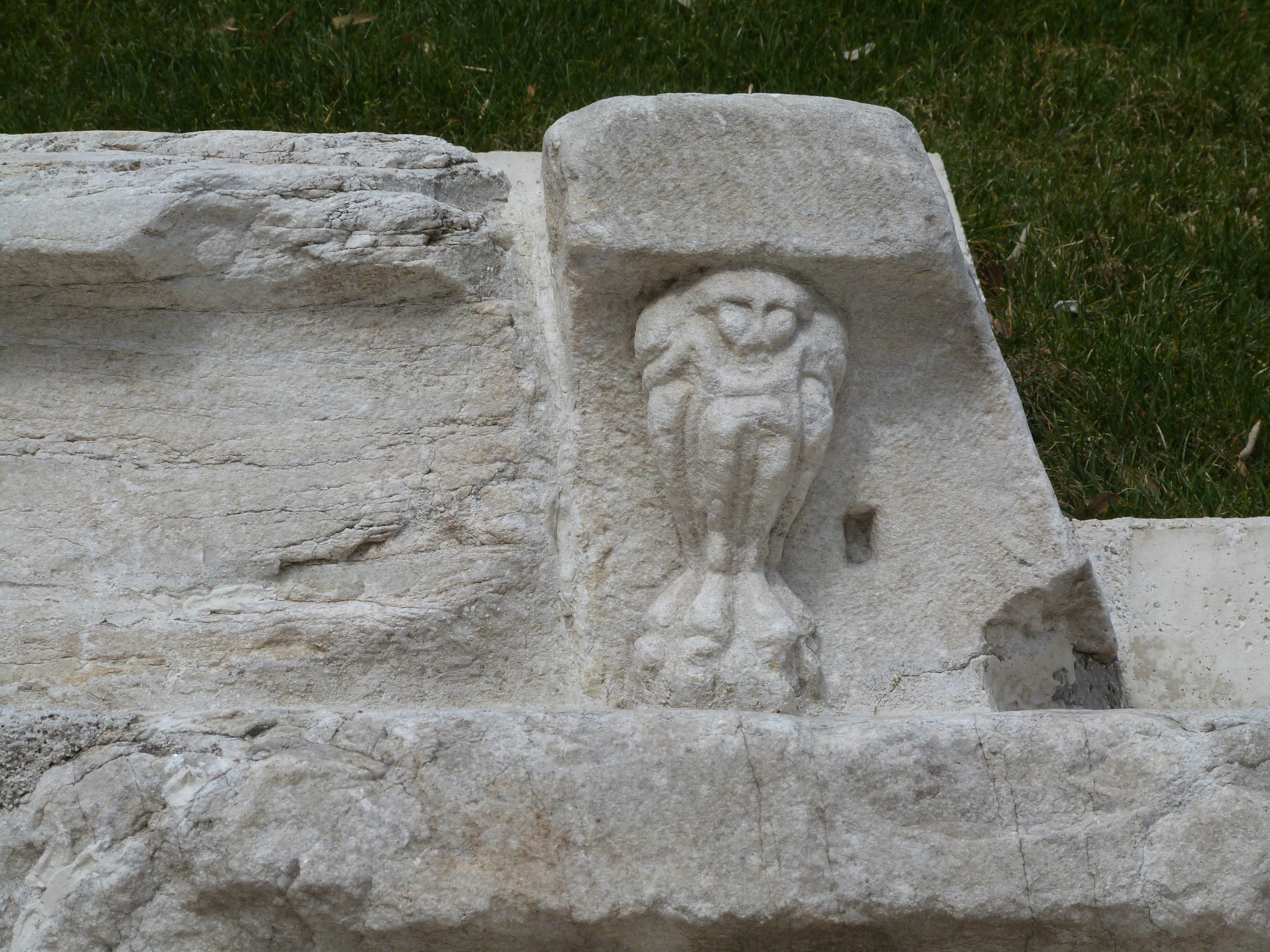
Detail of a seat decorated with a lion paw

== See also ==
- The list of Circus (building). The relatively small size of the structure, which predicts its usage mainly for athletic games, however, suggests that it is more correct to consider it a stadium, than a circus.
