= Hippodrome =

Ancient Greek stadium for horse and chariot racing

Hippodrome is a term sometimes used for public entertainment venues of various types. A modern example is the Hippodrome which opened in London in 1900 "combining circus, hippodrome, and stage performances".

The term hippodroming refers to fraudulent sporting competitions, such as in racing or baseball.

== Etymology ==
The word "hippodrome" is derived from Ancient Greek hippódromos (Greek: ἱππόδρομος), a stadium for horse racing and chariot racing. The name itself is a compound of the words híppos (Greek: ἵππος), meaning "horse", and drómos (Greek: δρόμος), meaning "course". The ancient Roman counterpart was the circus.

== Description ==
One end of the hippodromos of the Ancient Greeks was semicircular, while the other was a quadrilateral with an extensive portico. At the front thereof, at a lower level, were the stalls for the horses and chariots. On either end of the hippodromos were posts (Greek termata) around which the chariots turned. This was the most dangerous part of the track and the Greeks put an altar to Taraxippus (disturber of horses) there to show the spot where many chariots were wrecked. Where possible, it was built on the slope of a hill and the ground excavated from one side was transferred to the other to form an embankment thereat.

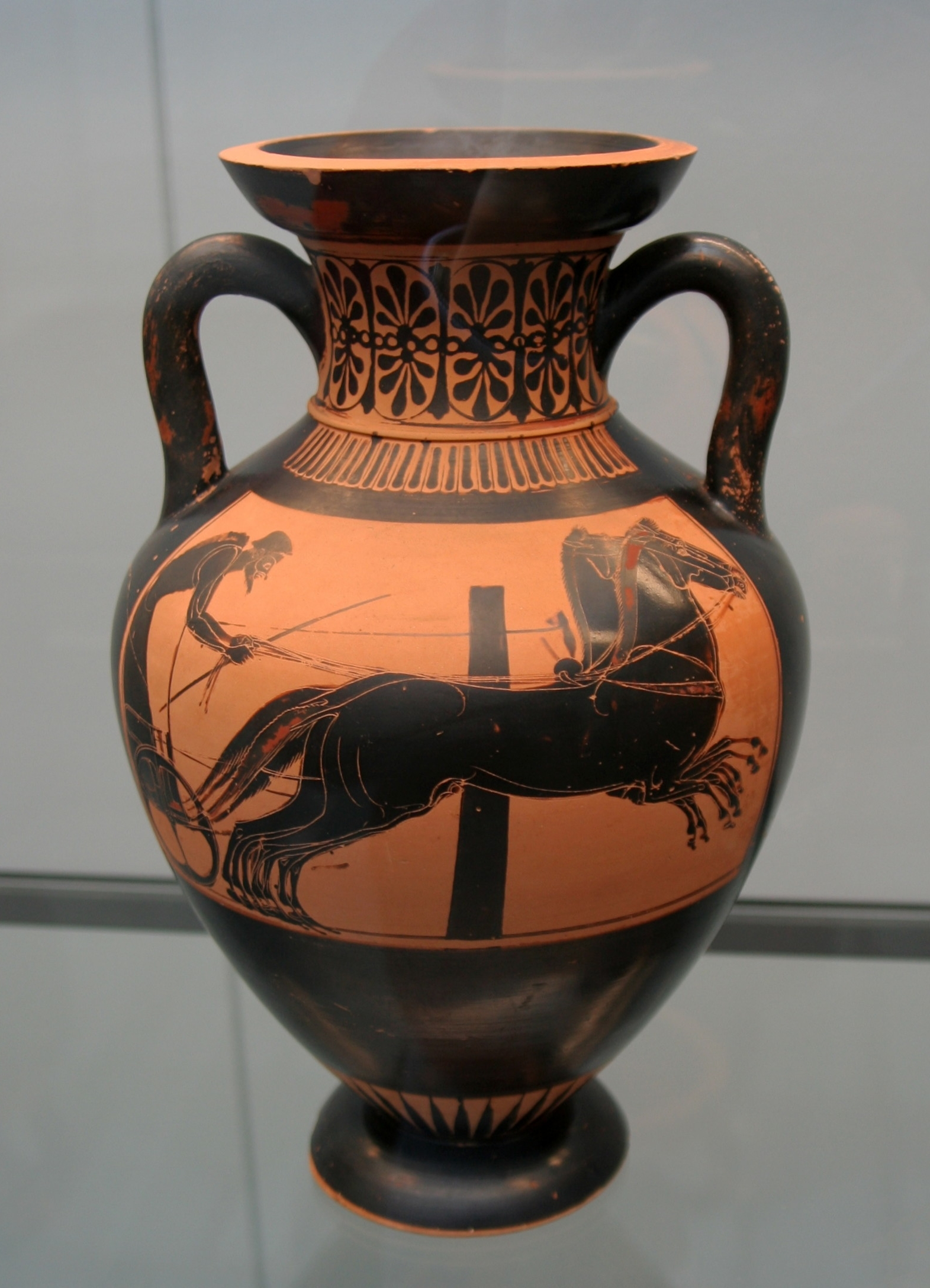
Biga chariot rounding a terma: Attic black-figure amphora, circa 500 BC, found at Vulci

== List of Greek hippodromes ==
- Delos
- Delphi
- Isthmia
- Lageion
- Mount Lykaion
- Nemea
- Olympia

== List of Roman circuses ==
- Aphrodisias
- Camulodunum (Colchester, England)
- Caesarea Maritima
- Circus Maximus
- Circus of Maxentius
- Gerasa
- Hippodrome of Berytus
- Hippodrome of Constantinople
- Hippodrome of Thessalonica
- Tyre Hippodrome
- Miróbriga (Mirobriga Celticorum)
- Roman circus of Mérida
- Roman Stadium of Philippopolis

== See also ==
- List of horse racing venues
- Hippodrome of Constantinople

Other structures called hippodromes:

- Hippodrome du parc de Beyrouth
- Kensington Hippodrome
- Madison Square Garden (1879). It is known as the "Great Roman Hippodrome"
- New York Hippodrome Theatre
- Brighton Hippodrome Entertainment venue in the ancient centre of Brighton
- Birmingham Hippodrome Theatre
- Bristol Hippodrome Theatre
- Hulme Hippodrome Theatre in Hulme, Manchester
- Hippodrome Theatre (Baltimore), or the France-Merrick Performing Arts Center
- Hippodrome Theater (Richmond, Virginia)
- The Hippodrome, formerly known as the McElroy Auditorium in Waterloo, Iowa
- Santa Monica Looff Hippodrome

Similar modern structures:

- Velodrome
- Oval track
- Dragstrip
