= Roman Forum, Beirut =

Historic Roman plaza in the city of Beirut, Lebanon

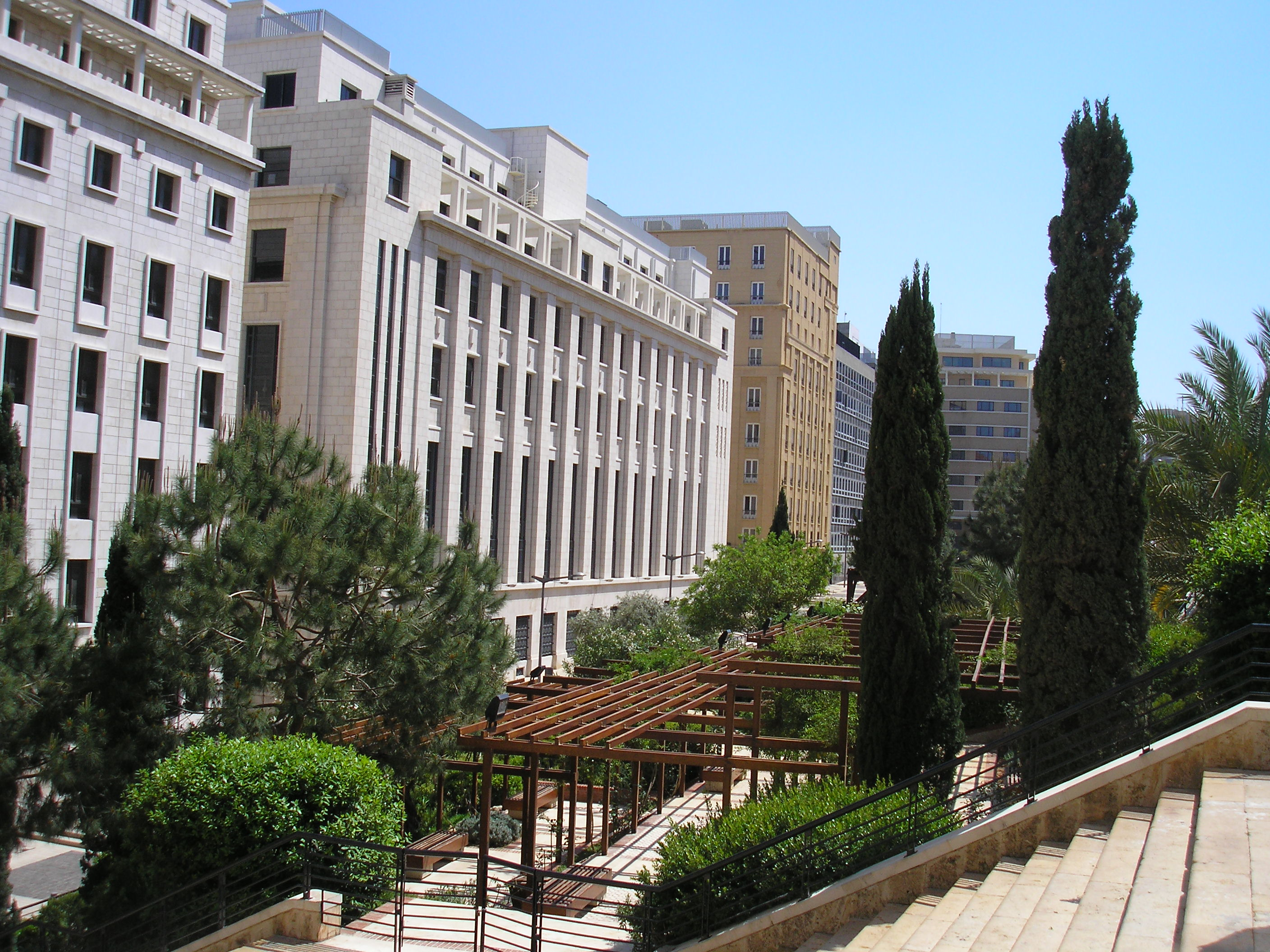
Roman Baths park in Downtown Beirut, in the area where there was the "Roman Forum"

The Roman Forum is located in Beirut, Lebanon.

== Overview ==
The façade of an ancient Roman public building was revealed in 1994, during the construction of the parliamentary offices, which indicated the presence of a Roman forum.

Next to it there was a theatre with a huge Roman hippodrome (one of the biggest five in the eastern Mediterranean shores).

...The Roman city (Berytus) spread farther S and W, with its Forum near the Place de l'Etoile. (Around the Forum) on its N side was a civic basilica 99 m. long with a Corinthian portico of polychrome materials (now in front of the "Beirut Museum"), dating from the 1st c. A.D. Some large baths have been uncovered on the E slope of the Colline du Sérail, and the hippodrome lay on the NW side of the same hill... J.-P. Rey-Coquais

In recent years there has been a confrontation on the preservation of these Roman archeological remnants, mainly for the Roman hippodrome and theatre located just on the north side of the Roman Forum.

== Construction ==
Archaeological excavations undertaken during the construction of parliamentary offices in 1994 revealed the northern façade of a Roman public building. The colonnades and decorated façades of the Forum expressed the city’s power and prosperity. A temple precinct marked the southern limit of the Forum, while a large bath complex flanked its northern side. After the 551 Beirut earthquake, the Forum‘s public buildings were partially restored. In the early 1970s, the clock tower in Etoile Square was dismantled to permit the archaeological investigation of the site. Several Roman columns were exposed. Today, they remain intact beneath the clock tower, which was re-erected in 1998 during Beirut's post-war reconstruction.

== History ==
During the construction of parliamentary offices in 1994, archaeological excavations revealed the northern façade of a Roman public building embellished with marble arched niches. The colonnades and decorated façades of the Forum, the central meeting place of Roman Berytus, expressed the city's power and prosperity. A temple precinct marked the southern limit of the Forum, while a large bath complex flanked its northern side. After the earthquake of 551 AD, the Forum‘s public buildings were only partially restored. Part of the bath complex remained in service well into the 10th century. The pavement of the Cardo Maximus, the city’s main street during Roman times, continued to be in use within Souk al-Najjarin until 1934. It was removed at this time to make way for the execution of the star-shaped plan of Etoile Square. In the early 1970s, the clock tower at the center of the square was dismantled to permit the archaeological investigation of the site. Several Roman columns were exposed. These remain intact beneath the clock tower, which was re-erected in 1998 during Beirut's post-war reconstruction.

== Timeline ==
- 551 A.D.: Roman forum's public buildings were partially restored after the earthquake.
- Roman era: Pavement of the Cardo Maximus, the city’s main street; continued to be in use within Souk al-Najjarin until 1934.
- 10th century: Part of the bath complex remained in service until then.
- 1934: Cardo Maximus removed to make way for the execution of Etoile Square.
- Early 1970s: Clock tower at the center of Etoile Square was dismantled to permit the archaeological investigation of the site.
- 1994: Archaeological excavations revealed the northern façade of a Roman public building.
- 1998 Re-erection of the clock tower during Beirut’s post-war reconstruction.

== See also ==
- Beirut Central District
- Berytus
- Cardo
- Place Charles de Gaulle
