= Lageion =

Ancient hippodrome in Alexandria, Egypt

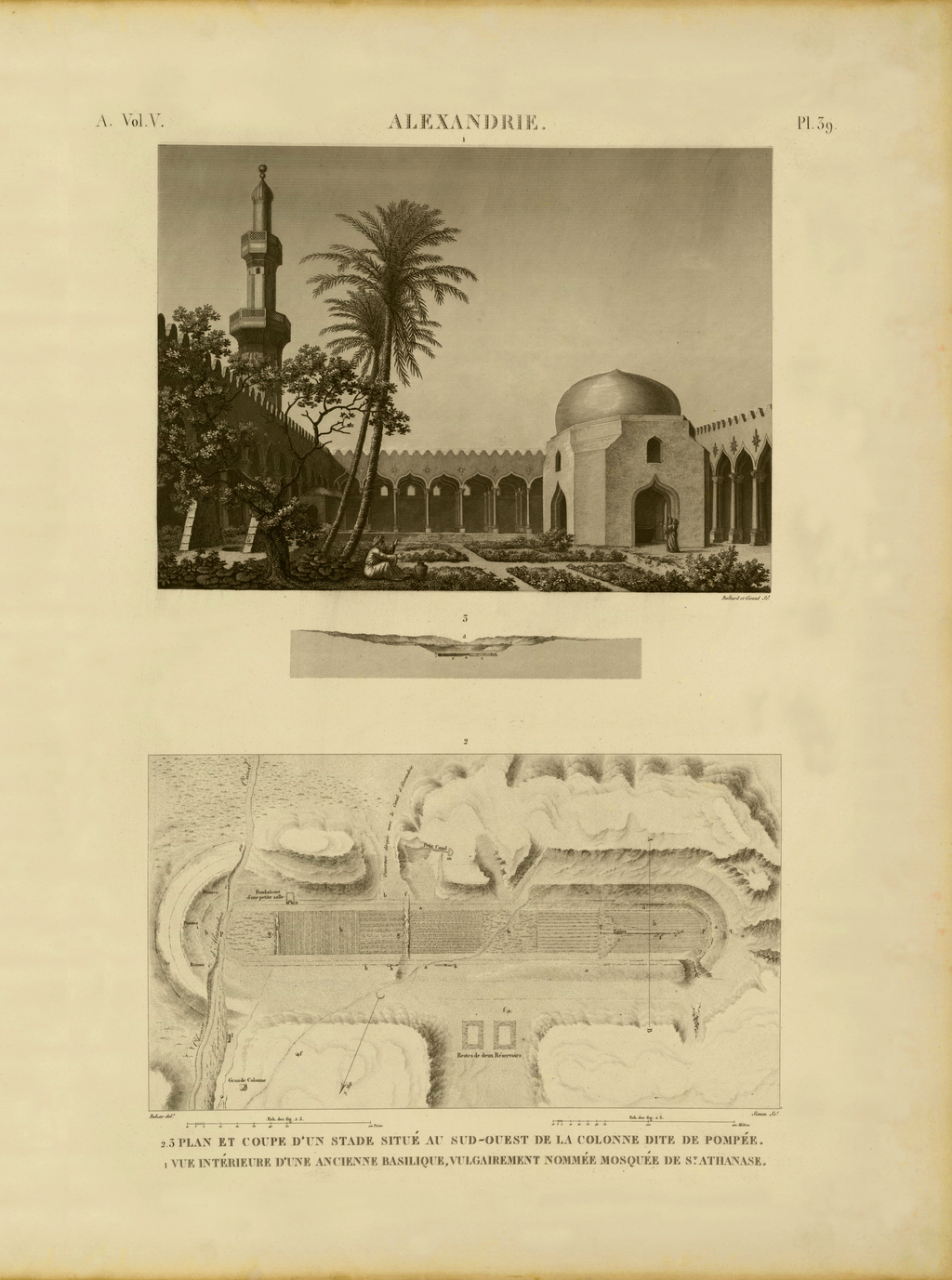
The upper part of the image shows an inside view of the Attarine Mosque. The lower part shows the outline of the Lageion.

The Lageion (Greek:Λαγεῖον, translit: Layeῖon) also known as the Hippodrome of Alexandria, was a hippodrome situated in the city of Alexandria, Egypt, below the Serapeum. It is named after the founder of the Ptolemaic Dynasty of Egypt, Ptolemy I Soter. Other sources cite that it was named after a figure called Lagos, who was believed to be the father of Ptolemy I.

The structure was covered up completely under housing during the end of the 19th century.

== Description ==
The size of the Lageion was 615 meter with curvature on both ends and its tracks were 568 meter in length as indicated by the records during the Napoleonic expeditions. Following the Hellenistic model for such a structure, it had tiered seats that were built on top of a system of parallel walls. The structure was similar to the hippodrome built at Cyrene and the Circus Maximus constructed in Rome during the reigns of Julius Caesar and Augustus.

The Lageion was constructed during the Ptolemaia and was first mentioned by Polybius, who described it as a theater. Records show that the Lageion was initially used as a stadium for athletic events and as a hippodrome racecourse later on. An account cited that the Lageion was also used during the late second- or early third century for official ceremonies such as imperial cult offerings. According to Plutarch, the Lageion was the location of the first clash between Octavian and Mark Antony in 30 BC. It was converted to a circus for chariot racing during the Roman period as indicated by the addition of a central dividing barrier (spina), which was found at the western end of the edifice.
