= Hippodrome of Berytus =

Roman circus in Berytus, now Beirut, Lebanon

- Location within Beirut Location within Lebanon
- 33°53′49″N 35°29′59″E
- Location: Beirut, Lebanon

The hippodrome of Berytus was a circus in the Roman colony of Berytus (modern-day Beirut). It is one of two hippodromes in Beirut.

== History ==
The hippodrome was built close to the port and forum of Berytus (modern Beirut). It was one of the largest in the Levant, occupying an area of 3500 m^{2}, and was probably similar in overall design to the Circus Maximus in Rome, comprising starting gates and a circuit of two straight tracks connected by a semicircular end. The circus was mostly used for chariot racing, which was an immensely popular and highly partisan spectator sport throughout the Roman Empire; the track would have been surrounded by seating tiers for spectators. The Berytus hippodrome is mentioned in the anonymous, late 4th century Expositio totius mundi et gentium ("A description of the world and its people") as one of the five best racing circuits in the Levant, the others being at Antioch, Laodicea, Caesarea and Tyrus.

During the 6th and the 7th centuries of the Byzantine Empire, violent factional and political disturbances at circuses (such as the Nike riots in Constantinople) led to their gradual abandonment as places of costly, officially subsidised mass entertainment. The hippodrome at Berytus fell into disuse and disrepair.

Its stone was later mined and reused in the construction of other buildings, according to archeologist Lee Levine. Its outline remained sufficiently clear in the 20th century for identification as a hippodrome by the archaeologist Robert du Mesnil du Buisson. Its groundworks were partially excavated in 1988. An approximately 90-meter section of wall has been uncovered, alongside the straight, and the foundations of seating tiers at the semi-circular end.

The hippodrome site is near the Grand Serail of Beirut within the Beirut Central District.

== Preservation ==
In 2009, the site was officially listed in the general inventory of historic buildings, and the Culture Minister Tamam Salam ruled that it should be preserved in situ and turned into a tourist landmark.

According to an article appearing in the French daily, L'Orient-Le Jour, Gaby Layoun, the Culture Minister at the time, approved in March 2012 plans for a luxury residential complex to be built over the ruins of Beirut's Roman Hippodrome, bypassing the recommendations of three of his predecessors: Tarek Mitri, Salim Wardé, and Tammam Salam. The Association for the Protection of the Lebanese Heritage (APLH) organized protests as an attempt to reverse the Culture Ministry's decision to allow the building over the hippodrome. Following the litigation brought by APLH, the court suspended on May 31, 2012, the Culture Ministry's decision, N˚ 849, to dismantle the Roman Hippodrome that would have allowed for the construction of a building project on the site. The site was protected until 2015 when construction began again.

== See also ==
- Circus of Carthage
