= Circus of Carthage =

Ancient Roman circus in Carthage, Tunisia

Coordinates: 36.8508°N 10.3137°E

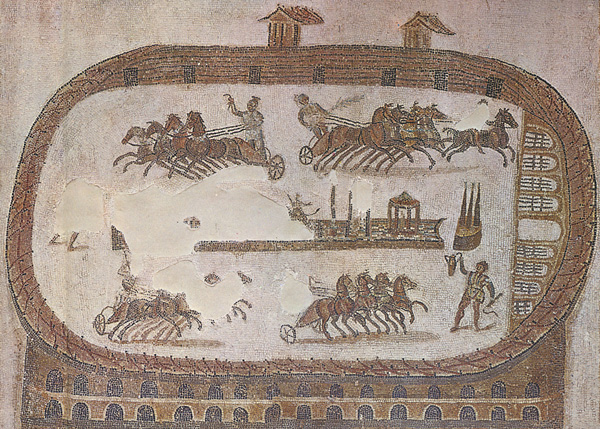
A mosaic of the Circus of Carthage

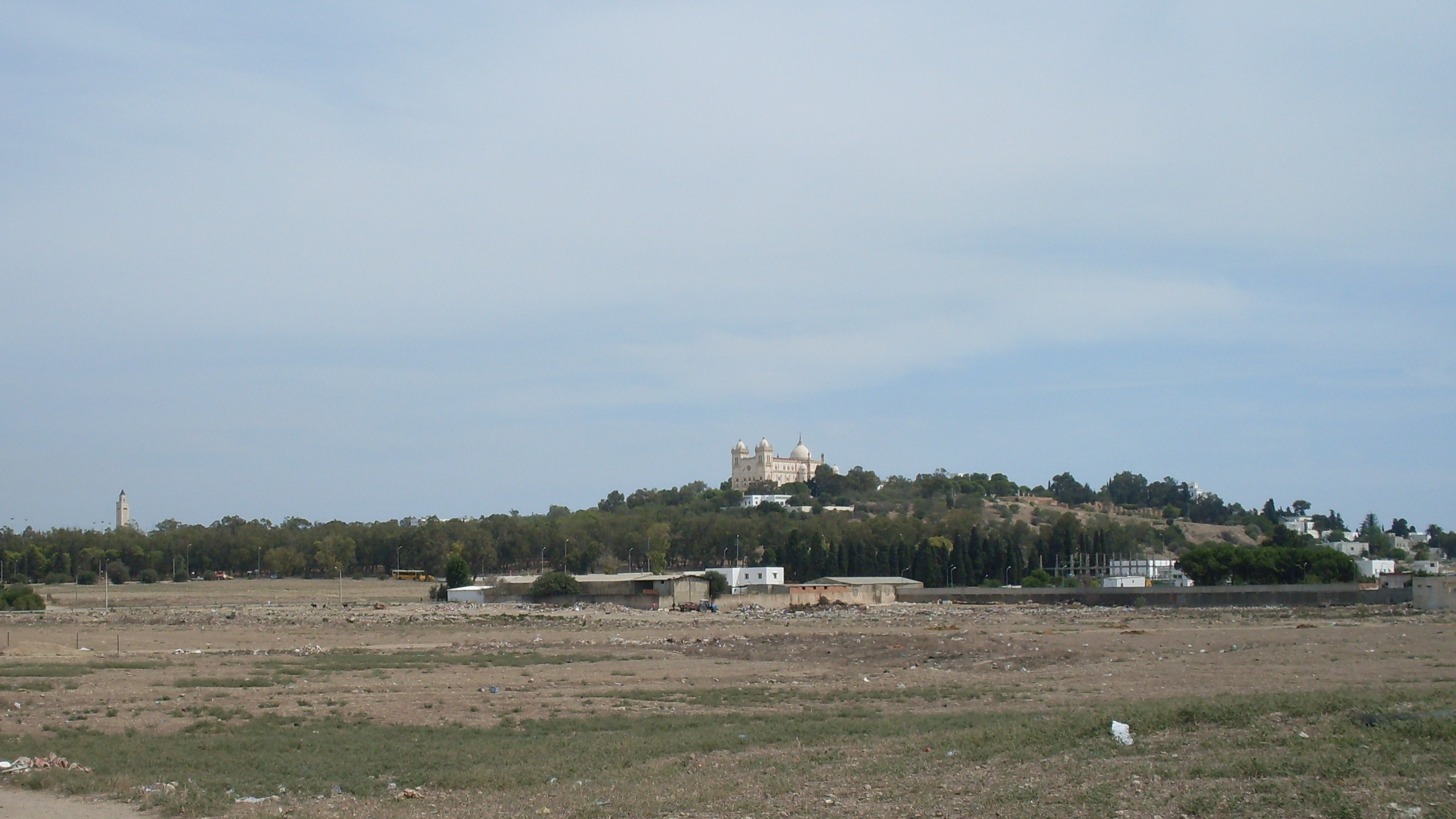
Location of the Circus of Carthage, with the Byrsa hill in the background.

The Circus of Carthage is a Roman circus in Carthage, in present-day Tunisia. Used for chariot racing, it was modeled on the Circus Maximus in Rome and other circus buildings throughout the Roman Empire. Measuring more than 470 m in length and 30 m in width, it could house up to 45,000 spectators, roughly one third of the Circus Maximus.

== History ==
The building seems to have been constructed sometime around 238 AD, and was used for several years before its official dedication. Salvian reports that as the Vandal armies closed in around Carthage they were met by "the sound of the people as they roared acclamations in the circus".

== Circus of Carthage design ==
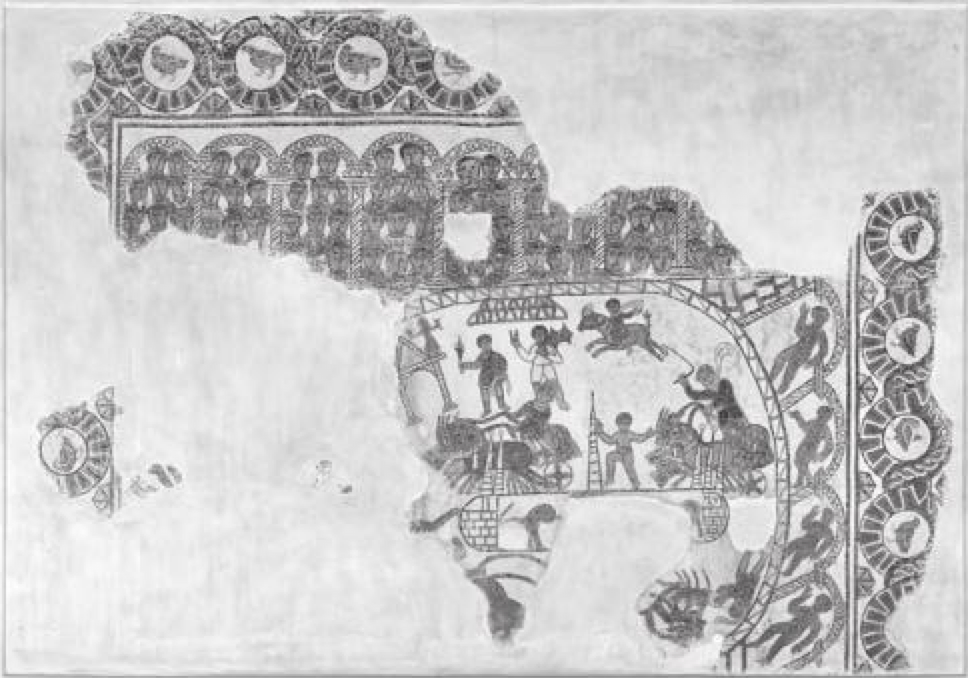
Mural of chariot races at the Circus of Gafsa

A brief description of the Circus of Carthage exists based on a mosaic found in Bardo National Museum in Tunis: "It is the only mosaic to show both the interior of the arena and the exterior façade, which has two arcades separated by a cornice. There also is an awning over the seats, which continue over the carceres, conveying more the appearance of an amphitheatre than a circus. The two temple-like structures above the seating are novel, as well, and may be situated at the break and finish lines."

== Building usage ==
The Circus of Carthage was Rome's second largest circus, one that rivalled the Circus Maximus.

The arena while smaller hosted many gamblers betting on the events there such as gladiatorial bouts and chariot races.

== Building materials ==
Remains from the Circus Maximus, specifically the spina (a dividing barrier) was put into the Circus of Carthage, as well as the Circus of Maxentius and the city of Vienne located in France. These remains of the spina are marble.

== See also ==
- Hippodrome – a Greek arena also used for chariot racing
- Carthage Punic Ports
