= Roman circus =

Large open-air venue used for public events in the ancient Roman Empire

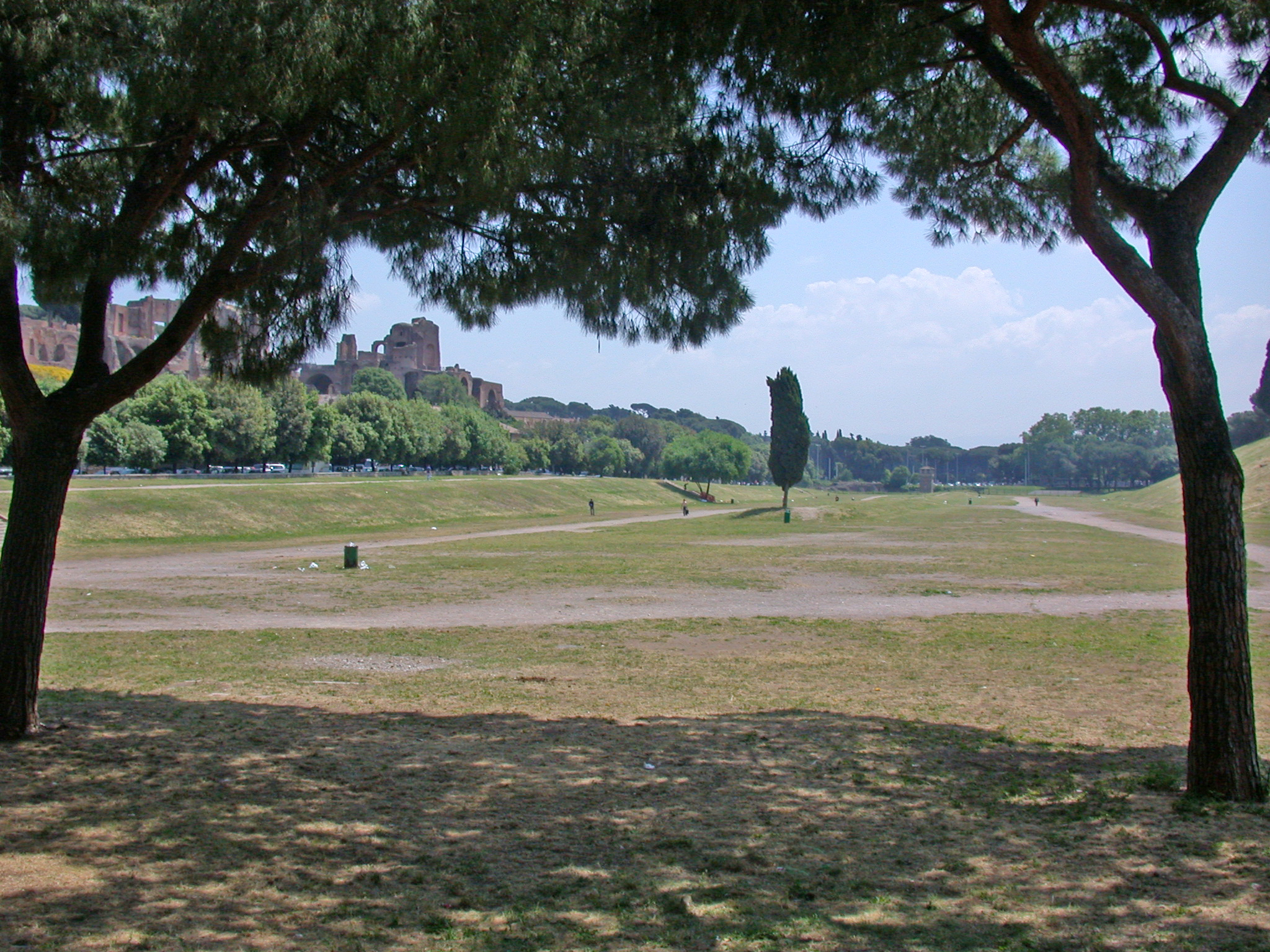
The site of the former Circus Maximus in modern-day Rome

A Roman circus (from the Latin word that means "circle") was a large open-air venue used mainly for chariot races, although sometimes serving other purposes. It was similar to the ancient Greek hippodrome. Along with theatres and amphitheatres, circuses were one of the main entertainment venues at the time.

Similar buildings, called stadia were used for Greek-style athletics particularly in the eastern, Greek speaking, part of the empire, but these were typically smaller than circuses.

According to Edward Gibbon the Roman people, at the start of the 5th century AD:

...still considered the Circus as their home, their temple, and the seat of the republic.

== Architectural design ==
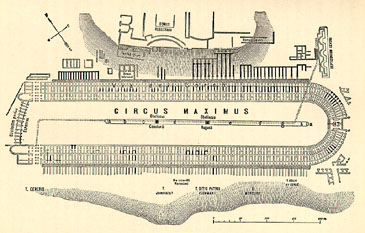
Floorplan of Circus Maximus. This design is typical of Roman circuses.

The performance space of the Roman circus was normally, despite its name, a rectangle of two linear sections of race track, separated by a median strip running along the length of about two thirds the track, joined at one end with a semicircular section and at the other end with an undivided section of track closed (in most cases) by a distinctive starting gate known as the carceres, thereby creating a circuit for the races. The Circus Maximus epitomises the design.

The median strip was called the spina and usually featured ornate columns, statues and commemorative obelisks. The turning points on either end of the spina were usually marked by conical poles, called the metae (singular: meta).

The track of the circus was normally surrounded by ascending seating along the length of both straight sides and around the curved end, though there were sometimes interruptions in the seating to provide access to the circus or the seating, or to provide for special viewing platforms for dignitaries and officials. One circus, that at Antinoöpolis (Egypt), displays a distinct gap of some 50m between the carceres and the start of the ascending seating where there is apparently no structure. This appears to be an exception.

The great majority of circuses fit the description above. Those that do not display two different variations: that at Emerita Augusta (Mérida, Spain), where the carceres end is substituted by a slightly curved 'straight' end joined to the straight sides of ascending seating by rounded corners of ascending seating; and a few in which the carceres end is substituted by a second semi-circular end to produce an oval shaped arena. These latter circuses are normally small (Nicopolis (Greece) and Aphrodisias (Turkey)), and should probably be considered stadia.

== Common characteristics ==
=== Dates ===
Differently from other major Roman structures circuses frequently evolved over long periods of time from a simple track in a field, through generations of wooden seating structures (frequently destroyed by fire or rot), before they finally began to be converted to stone. Although circuses such as the Circus Maximus (Italy) may have existed in some form from as early as around 500 BC, circuses were mainly constructed during the 400 years between 200 BC and 200 AD.

=== Dimensions ===
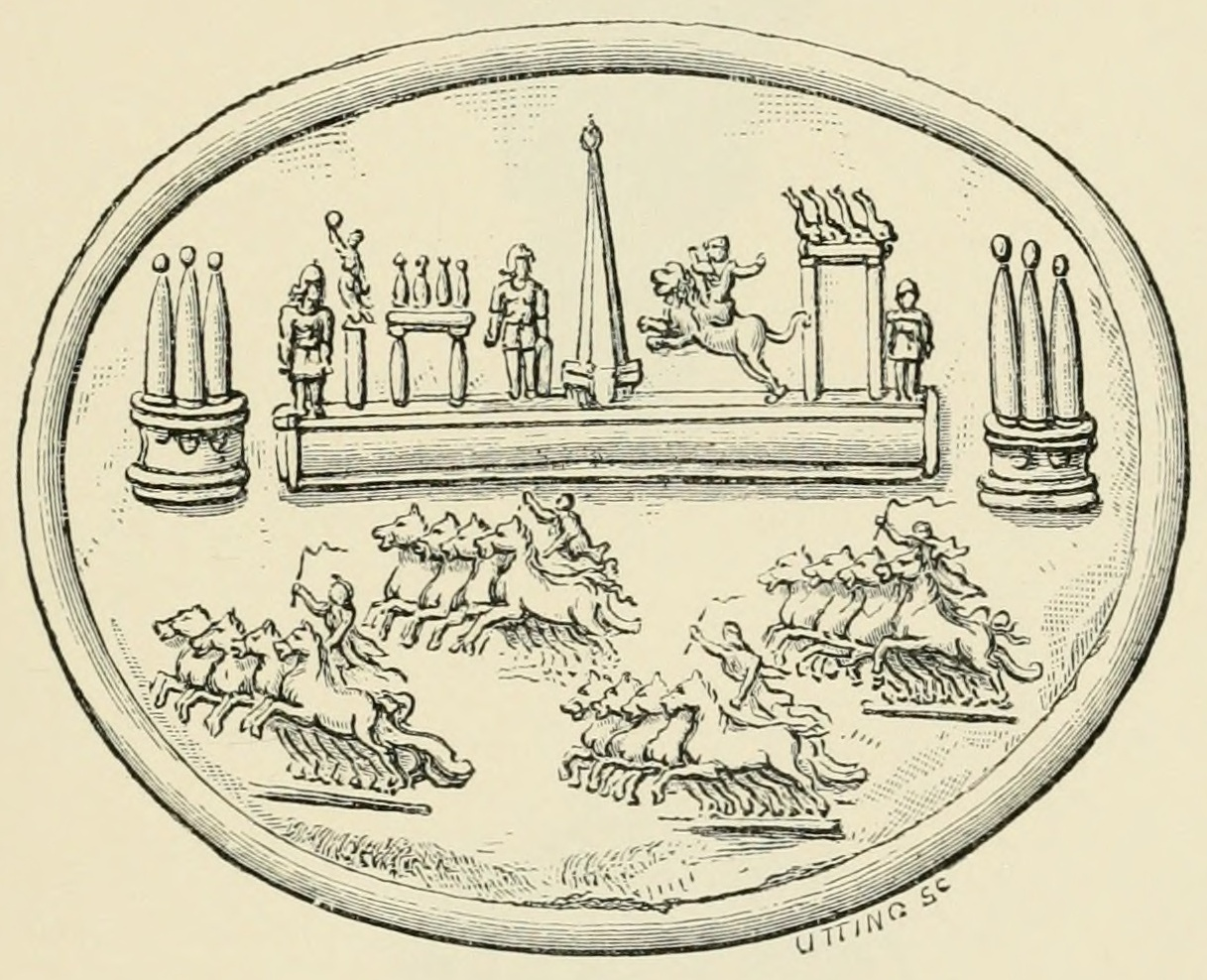
Circus, with chariot-race going on: the central division (spina) with its dolphin fountains, and the conical metae. Astarte on her lion, placed on the spina, being the tutelary goddess of Carthage, may indicate that this is the Circus of Carthage. After engraving in sard, much enlarged in the drawing; found at Binchester (Binovium).

The comparative dimensions of a circus may be measured in two basic ways: by the length of the track, and by the seating capacity. Other dimensions, such as the external dimensions of the structure may vary considerably depending on the location, the site, and on specific architectural characteristics.

The simplest comparative measurement of a circus is its track length. This is the most easily measured dimension, as it only requires small excavations at either end of the centreline. It is very probable that this can be done even when the circus is buried under subsequent constructions. Track lengths may vary from the 245 m of the circus at Gerasa (Jordan), to the 621 m of the Circus Maximus (Italy).

The alternative comparative dimension is that of seating capacity. This is much more complex to measure as it requires that the dimensions of the original vertical and horizontal extent of the inclined seating be re-established. In many cases the full structure of the inclined seating has been destroyed beyond the point where this can be measured, or at the least would require a great deal more excavation than that required for the measurement of the track length. Seating capacity may vary from around 15,000 people at Gerasa (Jordan), to 150,000 (some estimates put it up to 250,000) at the Circus Maximus (Italy).

=== Orientation ===
Circuses do not appear to have been constructed with any special compass orientation. Those that are well identified can be found with their round ends oriented around the compass. Examples include: N. Gerasa (Jordan); NE. Antinoöpolis (Egypt); E. Circus of Maxentius (Italy); E. Colchester (Britain); SE. Circus Maximus (Italy); S. Tyrus (Lebanon); SW. Gortyn (Greece); W. Circus of Nero (Italy).

=== Relative location ===
Circuses can be found at three distinct locations relative to the towns to which they belong:

- outside the city walls at anything up to 1.5 km distant, as at: Gerasa (Jordan) (c300m), and Leptis Magna (Libya) (1.5 km).
- simply within the town walls, as at: Thessalonica (Greece).
- inside the walls, in the heart of the town, and an integral part of the architectural power structure of the town, as at: Rome, Sirmium (Serbia) and Tarraco (Spain).

=== Carceres ===
The carceres, or starting gates, had a distinctive, slanted, slightly curved, plan form, designed to compensate for what would otherwise be significant differences in the distances from the individual starting gates to the start of the first section of straight track on the right hand side of the spina (as seen from the carceres). The carceres were designed for the races to be run round the spina in an anticlockwise direction.

The form of the carceres appears to have been standardised throughout the Roman world. The similarity in form among the carceres of circuses of many different sizes suggests that carceres were constructed according to a series of proportional mathematical relationships or formulas. It is not clear when the earliest carceres of the standardised form was constructed, nor whether there exists documentary evidence for the existence of such formulas.

Some of the best examples of carceres can be found at: Gerasa (Jordan) and the Circus of Maxentius (Italy).

== Best preserved ==
The best preserved circuses include: Emerita Augusta (Spain), Caesarea Maritima (coastal) (Israel), Circus of Maxentius (Italy), Gerasa (Jordan), Tyrus (Lebanon), Leptis Magna (Libya).

== List of Roman circuses ==
Unless otherwise indicated the coordinates in the following list are of a point that lies within the space of a circus. For the remaining circuses (those whose detailed location is not known) the point is for a location within the space of the historic nucleus of the associated town, or for a location within the associated archaeological site. These points are probably within 1.5 kilometres of the site of the circus, as a circus was almost always within this distance from its associated town.

(ordered initially by country; number of circuses at latest count (2012-04-01): 63)

City (Roman name) Link to detailed circus article	City (modern name)	Country	Coordinates	Notes References (sorts on length and precision of location)	Images
Auzia	Sour El-Ghozlane (= pre-independence Aumale)	Algeria	36.14799°N 3.690924°E (not the circus; historic nucleus of current town)	cited in Humphrey; no online circus-specific information found.	
Colonia Claudia Caesarea	Cherchell	Algeria	36.601412°N 2.184702°E	cited in Humphrey; approximate location; neither the form nor any original structure is visible.	(may not be oriented to north)
Saldae	Béjaïa	Algeria	36.755068°N 5.083765°E (not the circus; historic nucleus of current town)	cited in Humphrey; no online circus-specific information found.	
Setifis	Sétif	Algeria	36.197105°N 5.405214°E	cited in Humphrey; approximate location confirmed by old air photographs (90% of the circus has now been built over); only the southern, curved, end remains visible; U-shaped; approximate (formerly visible) track length: c450m; approximate (formerly visible) track width: c70m.	(may not be oriented to north)
Alexandria	Alexandria	Egypt	31.182489°N 29.896417°E (not the circus; approximate nucleus of Roman town; centred on Pompey's Pillar)	cited in Humphrey; no online circus-specific information found.	
Antinoöpolis	Mallawi (c10km)	Egypt	27.810092°N 30.885503°E	cited in Humphrey; visible track length: 300–350 m; visible track width: c45m; U-shaped; the carceres are c50m beyond the ends of the ascending seating at the open south-west end; clearly visible and unobstructed.	
Oxyrhynchus	Beni Mazar (c15km)	Egypt	28.535969°N 30.655336°E (not the circus; archaeological site of Roman town)	cited in Humphrey; no online circus-specific information found.	
Camulodunum (Colonia Claudia Victricensis)	Colchester	England	51.883604°N 0.898175°E	The only known chariot racing track in Britain. Discovered in 2004 by Colchester Archaeological Trust, it is c.450m long x 75m wide. It consisted of a long, narrow U-shaped arena, with evidence of eight starting-gates and a central archway at the square (west) end, and tiered seating-stands (cavea) around the rest of the circuit. There were passageways through the seating-stands all round the circuit to provide access for the spectators (and there would have been a large archway in the curved end). A central barrier known as a spina ran down the centre, c.239m long. Colchester Roman Circus, archaeological information; official archaeological information; length: c450m; width: c75m.	
Arelate (Colonia Iulia Paterna Arelatensium Sextanorum)	Arles	France	43.6734°N 4.61855°E	cited in Humphrey; official archaeological information; c40% of curved south-west end is minimally visible; the remaining structure lies to the north-east under a road junction and housing; length: c450m; width: c101m; visible track width: c80m.	(may not be oriented to north)
Lugdunum	Lyon	France	45.757314°N 4.815188°E (approximate hypothesised location)	cited in Chase; hypothesised location.	
Mediolanum Santonum	Saintes	France	45.7464°N 0.6333°W (not the circus; historic nucleus of the town)	cited in Humphrey; no online circus-specific information found.	
Vienna	Vienne	France	45.516492°N 4.868196°E (possibly very approximate; the satellite image at this location is extremely distorted)	Cited in Humphrey; the only remaining feature is a monumental arched structure topped by a tall, narrow, pyramid; this structure was on the spina.	(may not be oriented to north)
Augusta Treverorum	Trier	Germany	49.751175°N 6.648531°E	Cited in Humphrey; location; plan of Roman town showing location of circus; length: c450m.	
Corinth (Colonia Iulia Flavia Augusta Corinthiensis)	Corinth	Greece	37.909792°N 22.875938°E (hypothesised and partially excavated location)	discussion about the evidence for a circus; plan showing the hypothesised location of the circus and; hypothesised and partially excavated location.	
Gortyn, Gortys or Gortyna	Agioi Deka (c1.5 km)	Greece	35.052057°N 24.951119°E	cited in Chase; archaeological city plan; visible track length: c375m; visible track width: c50m; U-shaped plan form clearly visible; space 30% open agricultural land, 70% covered by orchard trees.	(may not be oriented to north)
Nicopolis	Preveza (c7km)	Greece	39.023563°N 20.734805°E	referred to as a stadium; very small for a circus; visible track length: c215m; visible track width: c20m; double-U-shaped plan form with both rounded ends clearly visible; the space is unoccupied by any modern structures.	
Thessalonica	Thessaloniki	Greece	40.629669°N 22.950890°E	location (the circus is marked 'Ancient Hippodrome'); archaeological map of historical centre of town, showing location of hippodrome/circus (in Greek; hippodrome = Ιππόδρομος); approximate length inferred from and: c525m.	
Rhodes	Rhodes	Greece	36.43919°N 28.211909°E		
Caesarea Maritima (coastal)	Caesarea	Israel	32.4986°N 34.8906°E	cited in Humphrey; referred to as a hippodrome; on the coast; parallel to the coast; visible track length: c290m; visible track width: c45m; U-shaped plan form clearly visible; structure substantially complete; few modern structures constructed within the space.	(may not be oriented to north)
Caesarea Maritima (inland)	Caesarea	Israel	32.4986°N 34.8986°E	c1km inland from the coast; visible track length: c410m; visible track width: c80m; form substantially visible; apparently U-shaped; the space is unoccupied by any modern structures.	(may not be oriented to north)
Aquileia	Aquileia	Italy	45.775007°N 13.361778°E	cited in Humphrey; location; track length measured from location information: c460m; track width measured from location information: c80m.	(may not be oriented to north)
Bovillae	Marino, Lazio	Italy	41.757499°N 12.621679°E	cited in Humphrey; (in Italian); information and photos in English; (track?) length: 328.50m; (track?) width: 60m; location centred on the only visible remains – three stone arches (part of the carceres).	
Mediolanum	Milan	Italy	45.463276°N 9.179936°E	Cited in Chase; location; track length: 460m; track width: 67/68m; the principal visible remains are a tower at the north western corner of the circus; the main body of the circus lay SSE of this tower.	(may not be oriented to north)
Roma Circus Flaminius	Rome	Italy	41.892758°N 12.477422°E	Cited in Humphrey; it is not entirely clear whether this 'structure' was, in fact, a circus or stadium of the form of the others in this list; Wikimapia location; estimates of size are: length 260–500 m, width 100m.	
Roma Circus of Maxentius, a.k.a. Circus of Caracalla	Rome	Italy	41.854645°N 12.522411°E	Visible track length: c490m; visible track width: c80m; form clearly visible; U-shaped; the space is unoccupied by any modern structures; many parts of the structure are visible.	(may not be oriented to north)
Roma Circus Maximus	Rome	Italy	41.886016°N 12.485404°E	Track length: c621m; track width: c150m; form substantially visible; U-shaped; the space is practically unoccupied by any modern structures; only a few parts of the structure are visible or remain.	
Roma Circus of Nero, a.k.a. Circus of Caligula, or Vatican Circus	Rome	Italy	41.901638°N 12.455256°E	Cited in Humphrey; location just to the south of St. Peter's Basilica well established, though exact position and orientation unknown; the only surviving remains are the obelisk which was brought from Egypt to adorn the spina in 37 AD; the obelisk was moved to its current location in Saint Peter's Square in 1586.	(may not be oriented to north)
Roma Circus Varianus; it:Circo Variano (in Italian)	Rome	Italy	41.887353°N 12.520474°E	Cited in Humphrey; Wikimapia location; length: 565m; width: 125m.	(may not be oriented to north)
Gadara	Umm Qais	Jordan	32.656914°N 35.666857°E	Cited in Humphrey; a German language archaeological site map of Gadara indicates a location for what is described as a hippodrome.	
Gerasa	Jerash	Jordan	32.273655°N 35.890730°E	cited in Humphrey; visible track length: c245m; visible track width: c50m; form clearly visible; U-shaped; the space is unoccupied by any modern structures; a great deal of the structure still stands.	(may not be oriented to north)
Colonia Iulia Augusta Felix Berytus Beirut Hippodrome	Beirut	Lebanon	33.897911°N 35.499584°E	cited in Humphrey; the location is of the archaeological site of the Beirut Hippodrome as given on Wikimapia; this may, or may not, be the same structure as the circus.	
Tyre Hippodrome	Tyre	Lebanon	33.268313°N 35.209776°E	cited in Humphrey; visible track length: c435m; visible track width: c80m; form clearly visible; U-shaped; the space is unoccupied by any modern structures; a great deal of the structure is still visible.	(may not be oriented to north)
Cyrene	Shahhat	Libya	32.822221°N 21.864104°E	cited in Humphrey; visible track length: c300m?; visible track width: c45m; form reasonably visible; U-shaped; the space is unoccupied by any modern structures; little of the structure is still visible; sometimes referred to as a hippodrome.	(may not be oriented to north)
Leptis Magna	Khoms OR Al Khums (c3km)	Libya	32.633056°N 14.310547°E	cited in Humphrey; located both on and parallel to the sea shore; visible track length: c445m; visible track width: c75m; form clearly visible; U-shaped; the space is unoccupied by any modern structures; some of the structure is still visible.	(may not be oriented to north)
Aeminium	Coimbra	Portugal	40.209016°N 8.425387°W (not the circus; nucleus of the Roman town)	believed to have existed, but unconfirmed; archaeological information about the Roman town; reference to a suggested location for the circus (Praça do Comércio); suggested location.	
Balsa	Tavira	Portugal	37.090488°N 7.685301°W	cited in Humphrey; the location is approximately that indicated conjecturally, though with considerable certainty, at; that site states "the topographic marks of [the circus] permit a reasonably rigorous survey"; length: c375m; width: c80m.	
Miróbriga	Santiago do Cacém (c2km)	Portugal	38.002318°N 8.683770°W	cited in Chase; visible track length: c330m; visible track width: c70m; form clearly visible; U-shaped; the space is unoccupied by any modern structures; little of the structure is still visible.	(may not be oriented to north)
Olissipona	Lisbon	Portugal	38.713788°N 9.139192°W	in what is today the 'Rossio'; an account (in Portuguese) of excavations which uncovered a section of the spina of the circus can be found at.	
Sirmium	Sremska Mitrovica	Serbia	44.967364°N 19.612151°E	cited in Humphrey; the location is a close approximation based on information at; length: c450m; width: c150m; the structure lies buried some 2–4 m under the current town centre, just to the north of the partially excavated palace; only very small sections have been excavated.	
Calagurris	Calahorra	Spain	42.304811°N 1.963025°W	cited in Humphrey; the circus lies under the pedestrian thoroughfare 'Paseo Del Mercadal'; length c300-350m.	
Cáparra	Capera	Spain	40.166847°N 6.101135°W (not the circus; nucleus of the Roman town)	cited in Humphrey; the location, from Wikimapia and Spanish Wikipedia is of the ruins of the Roman city only; there is no indication of the location of the circus.	
Corduba	Córdoba	Spain	37.885079°N 4.772803°W	location from Wikimapia and others; length: c370m; entirely buried under the existing city centre; virtually no remains visible.	
Emerita Augusta Circus Maximus (Mérida)	Mérida	Spain	38.920037°N 6.332116°W	Cited in Humphrey; visible track length: c400m; visible track width: c85m; form clearly visible; U-shaped but without the distinctive slanted 'flat' carceres end seen in many other circuses; instead the 'flat' end is slightly rounded; the space is unoccupied by any modern structures; much of the structure is still visible.	(may not be oriented to north)
Italica	Santiponce	Spain	37.43856°N 6.039444°W (not the circus; nucleus of the Roman town)	cited in Humphrey; very approximate location; the circus lies under the centre of the existing old town of Santiponce; nothing is visible; note that the very large amphitheatre at Italica is sometimes referred to as a circus.	
Saguntum	Sagunto	Spain	39.681644°N 0.276675°W	cited in Humphrey; the location of the circus has been confirmed by the excavation, and preservation, of a gate to the circus; the circus lies buried under the existing town; only the gate is visible; length: c350m; width: c73m.	(may not be oriented to north)
Tarraco	Tarragona	Spain	41.116963°N 1.255832°E	cited in Humphrey; most of the circus lies buried under the existing town; a substantial part of the curved eastern end, and part of the south-western side, are visible; track length: c290m; track width: c75m.	(may not be oriented to north)
Toletum	Toledo	Spain	39.863689°N 4.029978°W	Cited in Humphrey; between a third and a half of the circus, including the round end, is partially visible; the remainder of the circus, has either been obliterated, or lies under modern constructions; suggested length: c430m; visible width: c75m.	(may not be oriented to north)
	Zafra	Spain	38.423701°N 6.416107°W (not the circus; historic nucleus of town)	cited in Humphrey; there appears to be significant uncertainty about the status, and even name, of Zafra in the Roman era; the town appears to have no significant Roman remains other than those of some 20 Roman villas in the surrounding area; no online circus-specific information found.	
Nova Trajana Bostra	Bosra Eski Sham OR Busra Eski Şam OR Busra ash-Sham	Syria	32.5149°N 36.4799°E	cited in Humphrey; French maps of Roman Bosra showing the location of the circus (or hippodrome); visible track length: c430m; visible track width: c110m; form clearly visible; U-shaped; the space is virtually unoccupied by any modern structures; much of the structure still stands.	(may not be oriented to north)
Laodicea ad Mare	Latakia	Syria	35.519688°N 35.775046°E (not the circus; historic nucleus of the town)	cited in Humphrey; no online circus-specific information found.	
Abthugni	Henchir Souar OR Henchir Esch Schorr OR Henchir es Souar	Tunisia	36.197695°N 10.008889°E (not the circus; nucleus of the Roman town).	cited in Humphrey; coordinates of place; location of place on topographic map (ref: NJ 32-15/510322); references to Henchir Souar; aerial photograph of place confirms coordinates reference; topographic features on aerial photograph match with; no online circus-specific information found.	
Carthago Circus of Carthage	Carthage	Tunisia	36.850222°N 10.315239°E	Cited in Humphrey; location; length: c500m; width: c90m; U-shaped; very little remains visible; partly occupied by modern constructions.	(may not be oriented to north)
Commodum OR Municipium Aurelium Commodum	Henchir Bou Cha or Henchir Fraxine	Tunisia	36.532221°N 9.884513°E (not the circus; nucleus of the Roman town)	cited in Humphrey; archaeological document of Tunisian government (in French); location of place on topographic map (ref: NJ 32-15/498358); no online circus-specific information found.	
Hadrumetum OR Colonia Concordia Ulpia Trajana Augusta Frugifera Hadrumetina	Sousse	Tunisia	35.829783°N 10.624434°E (probable location)	cited in Humphrey; probable location based on information in 1903 documents (in French), reinforced by an undated aerial photograph; visible length (as measured on Wikimapia based on cross-reference with aerial photograph): c350m or greater.	
Thugga OR Municipium Septimium Aurelium Liberum Thugga	Dougga	Tunisia	36.4265°N 9.2161°E (approximate location)	cited in Chase; approximate location, on the north western edge of town, suggested (though not explicitly identified) on plan, and plan; various lengths are referenced: c175m, 393m; the site is open agricultural land with no subsequent occupation.	(may not be oriented to north)
Thysdrus	El Djem	Tunisia	35.301944°N 10.693480°E	cited in Humphrey; visible track length: c500m; visible track width: c70m; form lightly visible; U-shaped; the space is unoccupied by any modern structures; little of the structure is still visible.	(may not be oriented to north)
Utica	near Zana	Tunisia	37.051230°N 10.063141°E (probable location)	cited in Humphrey; Tunisian archaeological site number: 007.157 (Utique; Henchir Bechateur; UTIKA); reference to circus; uncorroborated location; more probable location as indicated by the maps in confirms the given location; approximate length measured from the maps in: 280-300m.	
Antioch Circus of Antioch	Antakya	Turkey	36.225754°N 36.171885°E	cited in Humphrey; location (from 1930s aerial photograph); map of ancient Antioch showing the circus as a hippodrome; length: c490m; width: c90m; very little visible today; is more visible in a 1930s aerial photograph; lightly over-built by modern structures and occupations.	(may not be oriented to north)
Aphrodisias	Aphrodisias	Turkey	37.712543°N 28.721985°E	Double-U-shaped; very substantially preserved; significantly smaller than other circuses; may be considered a stadium or hippodrome rather than a circus; visible track length: c220m; visible track width: 35m.	(may not be oriented to north)
Byzantium Hippodrome of Constantinople	Istanbul	Turkey	41.006548°N 28.975961°E	Built under Septimius Severus; estimated length: c450m; estimated width: c130m; other than some monuments from the spina, virtually none of the structure is visible today; it is believed much of the structure may lie buried some 2m below the current surface.	(may not be oriented to north)
Laodicea on the Lycus	Denizli (c6km)	Turkey	37.831074°N 29.104478°E	referred to as a stadium; double U-shaped and small; visible track length: c250m; visible track width: c40m; form clearly visible; no visible spina; unoccupied by any subsequent construction.	
Nicomedia	İzmit	Turkey	40.766754°N 29.920744°E (not the circus; historic nucleus of İzmit)	cited in Humphrey; general information on the archaeological remains of Nicomedia; Kocaeli municipal history, including a 19th-century map showing the location of the historic nucleus of the city (through history Kocaeli has been named successively: Olbia, Astakos, Nicomedia, Iznikmid, and Izmid or Izmit); no online circus-specific information found.	

== See also ==
- Hippodrome – a Greek arena also used for chariot racing
- Bread and circuses
