= List of ambassadors of Lebanon to the United States =

Coordinates: 38.9225°N 77.056111°W

Ambassador of Lebanon to the United States Embassy of Lebanon in Washington, D.C.
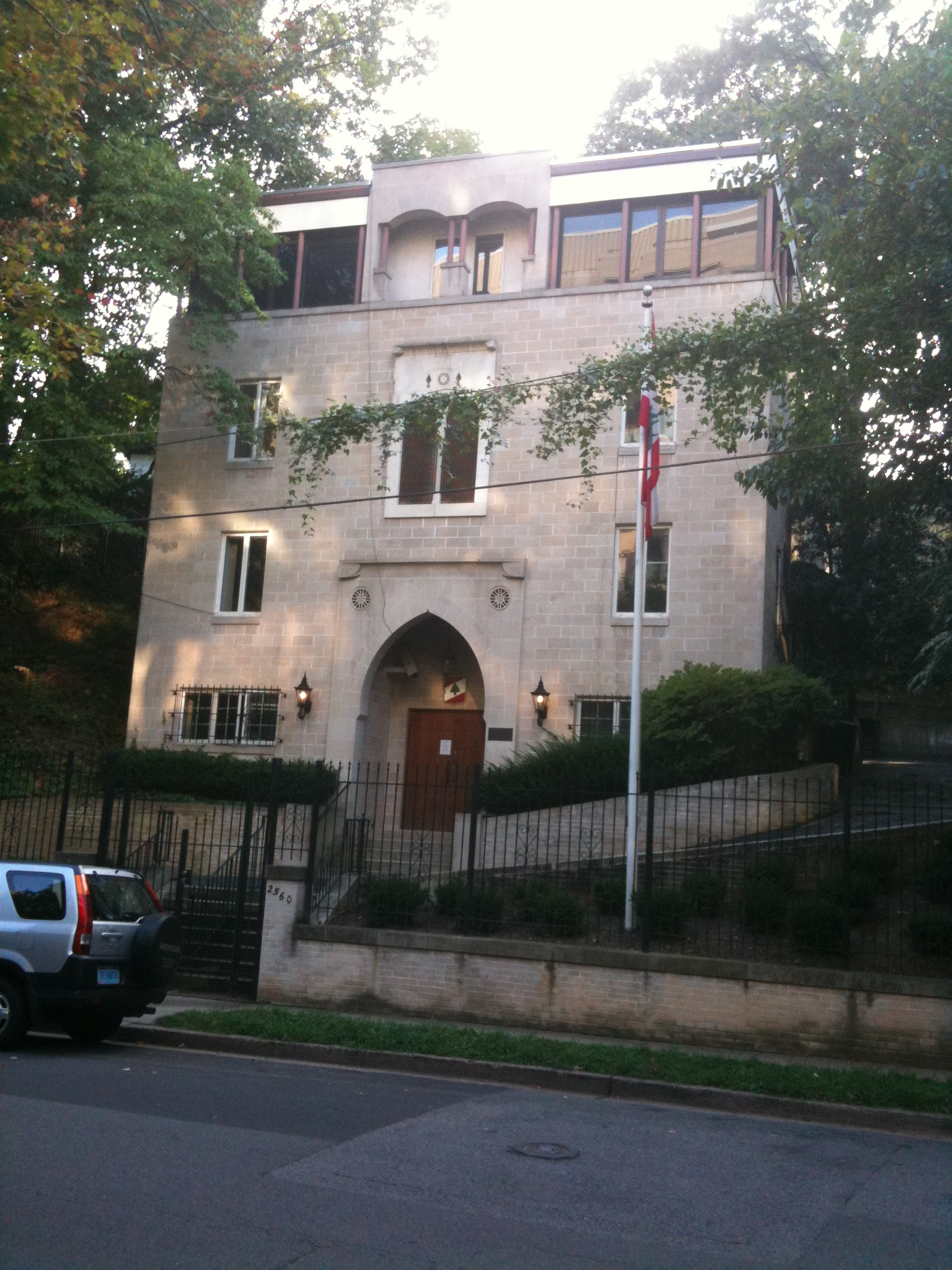
- Inaugural holder: Charles Malik
- Formation: April 19, 1945

The Lebanese ambassador in Washington, D. C. is the official representative of the Government in Beirut to the Government of the United States.

== List of representatives ==
Diplomatic agrément	Diplomatic accreditation	Ambassador	Observations	List of prime ministers of Lebanon	List of presidents of the United States	Term end
April 12, 1945			Legation opened	Abdul Hamid Karami	Harry S. Truman	
April 12, 1945	April 19, 1945	Charles Malik		Abdul Hamid Karami	Harry S. Truman	
May 4, 1953			Legation raised to embassy	Saeb Salam	Dwight D. Eisenhower	
April 23, 1953	May 4, 1953	Charles Malik		Khaled Chehab	Dwight D. Eisenhower	
September 12, 1955	November 8, 1955	Victor Khouri	alt. rep., Fifth GA (*1903). LL.D., U. of Paris. Counselor of legation, London, 1944; E.E. and M.P., London, 1947–present; del., UN Prep. Comm., London, 1945–46; del., Goodwill Mission to Latin Am. Countries.: Defence Minister Major -General	Sami as-Solh	Dwight D. Eisenhower	
January 20, 1958	February 10, 1958	Nadim Demechkie	1970:United Kingdom	Sami as-Solh	Dwight D. Eisenhower	
August 8, 1962	August 22, 1962	Ibrahim Hussein al-Ahdab	*Diplomat, chairman of the board. (* 21 March 1904 in Beirut).: Son of Hussein Ahdab and Mrs. Sabira.; Married on 22 November 1922 to Miss Joumana Ahdab.	Rashid Karami	John F. Kennedy	
June 6, 1967			When relations with U.S. were severed by several Middle East countries, Lebanese Ambassador requested his name be continued as Ambassador, although he was absent. He returned to the U.S. and served until appointment of Ambassador listed below.	Abdallah El-Yafi	Lyndon B. Johnson	
October 30, 1968	November 12, 1968	Najati Kabbani	KABBANI (Najati, Najib), Diplomate. Né en 1917 à Damas (Syrie).: Fila de Najib Kabbani et de Mme, née Neemat Rached.; Marié le 9 Septembre 1955 avec Mlle Raja Shérif, 2 enfants: Najib et Sawsa	Abdallah El-Yafi	Lyndon B. Johnson	
October 9, 1978		Chawki Choueiri	Chargé d'affaires	Selim Hoss	Jimmy Carter	
October 23, 1978	November 16, 1978	Khalil Itani		Selim Hoss	Jimmy Carter	
May 12, 1983	June 16, 1983	Abdallah Bou Habib		Selim Hoss	Ronald Reagan	
March 1, 1990	April 9, 1990	Nassib Lahoud		Selim Hoss	George H. W. Bush	
June 26, 1992	September 8, 1992	Simon Karam		Rachid Solh	George H. W. Bush	
June 23, 1994		Riad Bahige Tabbarah	Lebanese UN official /economist (* 21 July 1933, Baghdad, Iraq): married; Education: BA in economics, American University of Beirut, Beirut, Lebanon, 1953–56; MA in economics, Northwestern University.	Rafic Hariri	Bill Clinton	
June 6, 1997	September 8, 1997	Mohamad Chatah		Rafic Hariri	Bill Clinton	
March 24, 1999	April 19, 1999	Farid Abboud		Selim Hoss	Bill Clinton	
June 4, 2008	June 6, 2008	Antoine Chedid		Fouad Siniora	George W. Bush	
January 27, 2016		Carla Jazzar	Chargé d'affaires, a.i.	Najib Mikati	Barack Obama	
December 15, 2017	January 24, 2018	Gabriel Issa		Saad Hariri	Donald Trump	January 22, 2020
March 15, 2021		Wael Hachem	Chargé d'affaires, a.i.	Saad Hariri	Joe Biden	September 5, 2025
	September 5, 2025	Nada Hamadeh Moawad		Nawaf Salam	Donald Trump	
