= List of ambassadors of Lebanon to China =

Coordinates: 39.946170°N 116.457070°E

Ambassador of Lebanon to China
- Incumbent; Milia Jabbour since December 5, 2017
- Inaugural holder: Mahmoud Banna
- Formation: July 31, 1958

The Lebanese ambassador in Beijing is the official representative of the Government in Beirut to the Government of the People's Republic of China. '

== List of representatives ==
Diplomatic agrément/Diplomatic accreditation	Ambassador	Observations	List of prime ministers of Lebanon	Premier of the People's Republic of China	Term end
July 31, 1958	Mahmoud Banna	In May 1958 the Lebanese Government appointed Mr. Mahmoud Banna as its first Minister to China. He arrived in Taiwan on July 31	Sami as-Solh	Chen Cheng	
November 9, 1971		The governments in Beirut and Beijing established diplomatic relations.	Saeb Salam	Zhou Enlai	
May 5, 1972	Élie Joseph Boustany	Elie Bustani had been appointed the first Lebanese Ambassador to China and that the Chinese Ambassador to Lebanon would be Cheng Yu. Lebanon recognised China.	Saeb Salam	Zhou Enlai	1982
July 28, 1983	Selim Tadmoury		Shafik Wazzan	Zhao Ziyang	1985
1984	Abdallah Comaty	Chargé d'affaires	Rashid Karami	Zhao Ziyang	1984
1985	Farid Samaha		Rashid Karami	Zhao Ziyang	1998
July 12, 1999	Zeidan al-Saghir		Selim Hoss	Zhu Rongji	2003
November 25, 2003	Sleiman Chafic El-Rassi	(* Sept. 15, 1946 in Ibl al-Saqi).: Son of Chafic Rassi and Mrs. Ramzieh Kassiss.; Married on May 5, 1 985 in Beirut to Mrs. Daisy Rahhal, 2 daughters, Rima and Lina.; Education: Ibl al-Saqi Primary School, Marjeyoun; Complementary School, Ecole Normale, Byr Hassan, Beirut. Lebanese University, Sanayeh, Beirut.; Dipl.: Licence in Law (Law Degree) Lebanese University.; Career: 8.2.1965: Teacher, Ministry of National Education.; 6.2.1978: Attache, Ministry of Foreign Affairs.; 1979-1983: Secretary, Embassy of Lebanon, Caracas, Venezuela.; 1983-1985: Secretary, Embassy of Lebanon, London, U.K..; 1985-1986: Head of the Section of Europe-Ministry of Foreign Affairs ().; 1986-1990: Secretary and Deputy Chief of Mission, Embassy of Lebanon, Washington, D.C., United States.	Rafic Hariri	Wen Jiabao	June 3, 2010
November 14, 2012	Mohammed Skayni	Chargé d'affaires	Najib Mikati	Wen Jiabao	
April 23, 2013	Farid Abboud		Najib Mikati	Li Keqiang	
December 5, 2017	Milia Jabbour		Saad Hariri	Li Keqiang	
