= Abdallah Bou Habib =

Lebanese politician (1941–2025)

- عبد الله بوحبيب
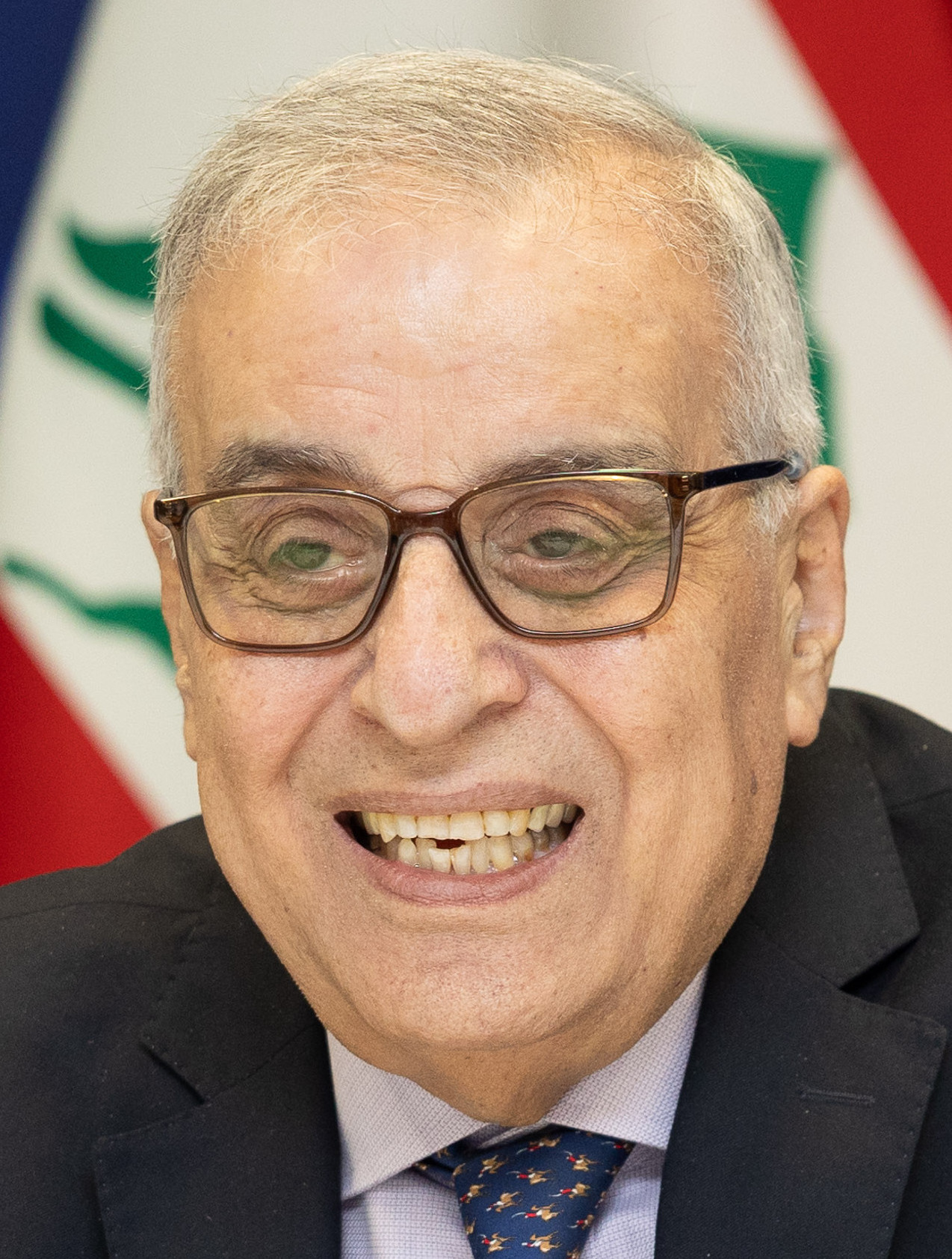
- Bou Habib in 2023

Minister of Foreign Affairs and Emigrants
- In office 10 September 2021 – 8 February 2025
- Prime Minister: Najib Mikati
- Preceded by: Zeina Akar (acting)
- Succeeded by: Youssef Rajji

Personal details
- Born: 21 November 1941 Jdeide, Lebanon
- Died: 23 July 2025 (aged 83) Beirut, Lebanon
- Party: Independent
- Education: American University of Beirut; Vanderbilt University

Abdallah Rashid Bou Habib (Arabic: عبد الله رشيد بوحبيب; 21 November 1941 – 23 July 2025) was a Lebanese economist, author and diplomat who served as Minister of Foreign Affairs from 10 September 2021 until 8 February 2025.

Bou Habib previously served as Adviser to the Deputy Prime Minister of Lebanon (2001–2005) and as Lebanon's Ambassador to the United States (1983–1990).

== Early life and education ==
Bou Habib was born in Jdeide, Lebanon. He was a graduate of Brummana High School (1960) and the American University of Beirut where he received his bachelor's degree in Economics (1967) and his master's degree in Economics (c. 1970). He received his Ph.D. in Economics from Vanderbilt University in Nashville, Tennessee in 1975. At Vanderbilt University Department of Economics he taught as Assistant Professor (1975–1976) and as Senior Teaching Fellow (1973–1975). He served as Lecturer at Notre Dame University, Lebanon (2002–2003) and at La Sagesse University, Lebanon (2003–2015).

== Career ==
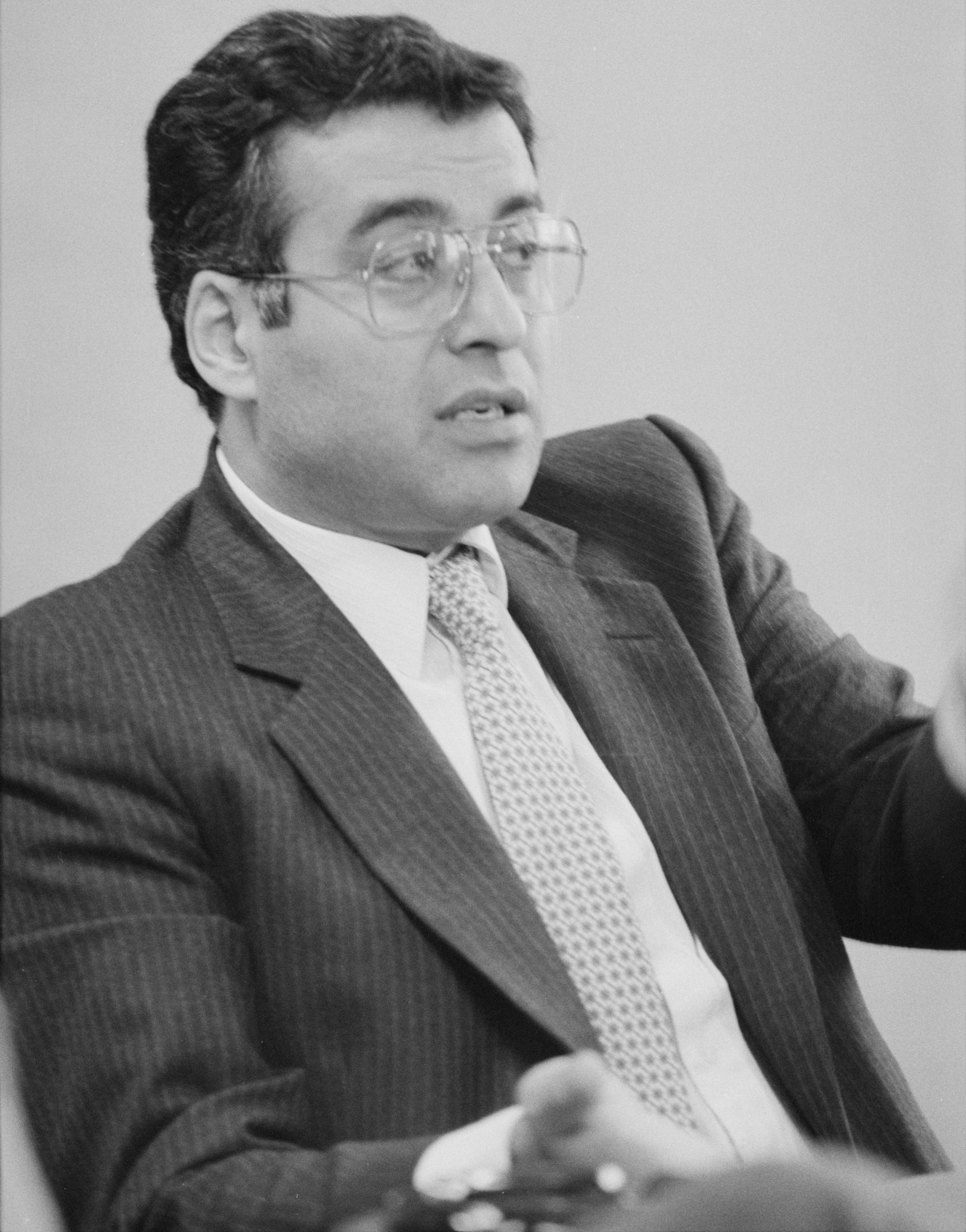
Abdallah Bou Habib as ambassador to the United States, 1983

In 1976, Bou Habib joined the World Bank Group where he served as an Economist and later as Senior Loan Officer until 1983. After serving as Ambassador of Lebanon to the United States, he rejoined the World Bank in 1992 and served as Senior Adviser to the Vice President of the MENA Region & Regional External Affairs Unit Chief, MENA Region until retirement in 2001.

Bou Habib wrote two books: America's Values and Interest/ A Half Century of US Foreign Policy in the Middle East, 2019 (Arabic) and Al Daou' Al Assar, US policy Towards Lebanon, a record of Bou Habib's seven years as Lebanon's Ambassador to the US, 1991 (Arabic). Over the last thirty years of his life, he published several articles about Lebanon in regional and international dailies. His Ph.D. dissertation: The Long-Run Supply of Crude Oil in the United States (Vanderbilt University, 1975) was published by Arno Press, NY, 1979.

From 2007 to 2015, Bou Habib founded and directed the Issam Fares Center for Lebanon, a non-partisan Beirut-based think-tank dedicated to the advancement of a balanced and realistic understanding of major global, regional and domestic issues affecting Lebanon.

== Personal life and death ==
Bou Habib was married to Julia Seabrook Cole and together they had three children and six grandchildren.

Bou Habib died after suffering a cardiac arrest on 23 July 2025, at the age of 83.
