= Façonnable =

French clothing brand

- Industry: Tailoring
- Founded: Nice, France, in 1950
- Founder: Jean Goldberg
- Parent: M1 Group
- Website: www.faconnable.com/en_eu/home

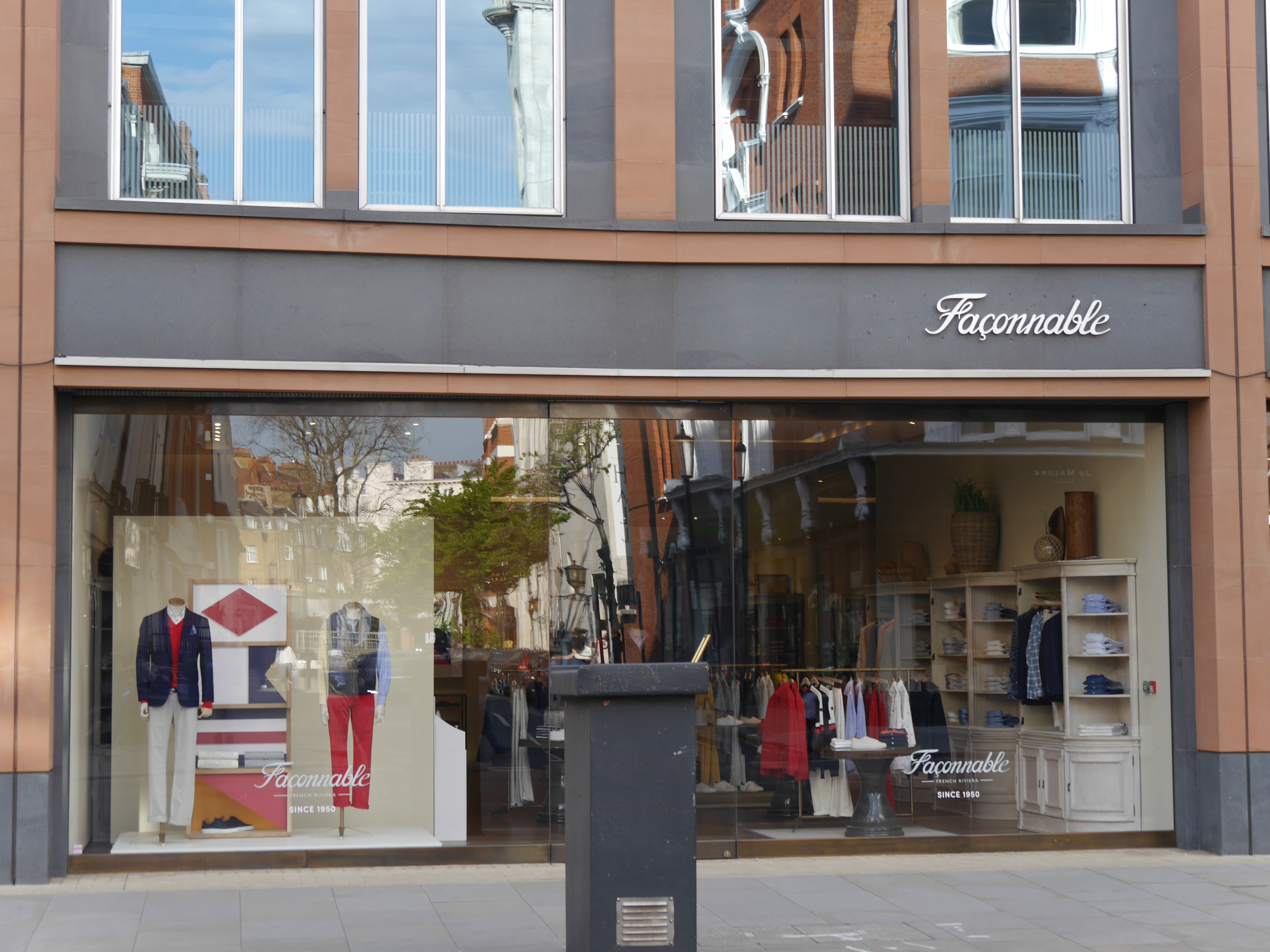
Façonnable, Sloane Street, London, 2022

Façonnable is a high-end men's and women's clothing brand founded in Nice, France by Jean Goldberg in 1950. It is currently owned by M1 Group, a holding company in Beirut, Lebanon.

== History ==
The first shop, situated in rue Paradis in Nice, was opened by French master tailor, Jean Goldberg. The store was frequented by film stars in need of bespoke tuxedos and gowns for events such as the annual Cannes Film Festival.

Jean Goldberg's store gained great notoriety across the French Riviera, dressing stars of the era such as Tony Curtis and Cary Grant in Goldberg's unique style of classic tailoring with a modern twist. In 1961 Goldberg retired, his son Albert Goldberg took over the Nice workshop.

Albert Goldberg learnt the art of cutting and finishing. He created a new fashion footprint shifting it to the prêt-à-porter (ready-to-wear) market. After a visit to New York's Brooks Brothers store, Albert Goldberg produced a collection of ready to wear outfits for men and renamed the business 'Façonnable', a variation of the word "Façonner" (English: "to shape").

In 1973, boutiques were opened along the Cote d'Azur in Monte Carlo, Cannes, Saint-Tropez, and in Marseille. Throughout the 1970s, Goldberg began to collaborate with large American and European companies such as Sebago, Alden and Van's to create a shoe collection. In 1975, Albert Goldberg worked with Loro Piana, the duo creating "Façorain", an invisible membrane allowing cashmeres and luxury wools to be wind and waterproof whilst retaining their texture and breathability.

The first Parisian boutique opened in 1984. In 1987, the brand diversified, releasing a collection of sunglasses and optical wear. In 1988, the chain entered into a distribution agreement with US department store chain Nordstrom. Façonnable released a line of wristwatches in 1990.

Façonnable opened its first US boutique at 689 Fifth Avenue in New York City in October 1993. The French fashion house launched a unique collection geared for the modern, American woman. Two further US boutiques were opened in 1997 located on the West Coast. Following the success of its American women's collection, Façonnable released the range for general sale across Europe in 1999.

== Ownership ==
Façonnable SAS was owned by the Goldberg family until the company was sold to Nordstrom Inc. in 2000 in a cash and stock deal worth $170 million. In September 2007, Lebanese private equity group M1 Group agreed to acquire Façonnable from Nordstrom Inc., for €152.985 million (US$210 million).

M1 Group is a holding company based in Beirut, Lebanon. It was founded in the early 1980s by Taha Mikati and his politically active brother Najib Mikati, the current and former Lebanese prime minister. The M1 Group covers a range of industries, including real estate, telecommunication, energy, aviation, cement and banking. M1 Group's CEO is Azmi Mikati.
