= Pepe Jeans =

Denim and casual wear jeans brand

Pepe Jeans London
- Type: Sociedad de responsabilidad limitada
- Industry: Fashion
- Founded: 1973 (London, England)
- Founder: Nitin, Arun and Milan Shah, Farook Jamal
- Headquarters: Sant Feliu de Llobregat, Spain
- Products: Jeans, shirts, shorts, eye glasses
- Parent: M1 Group
- Website: www.pepejeans.com

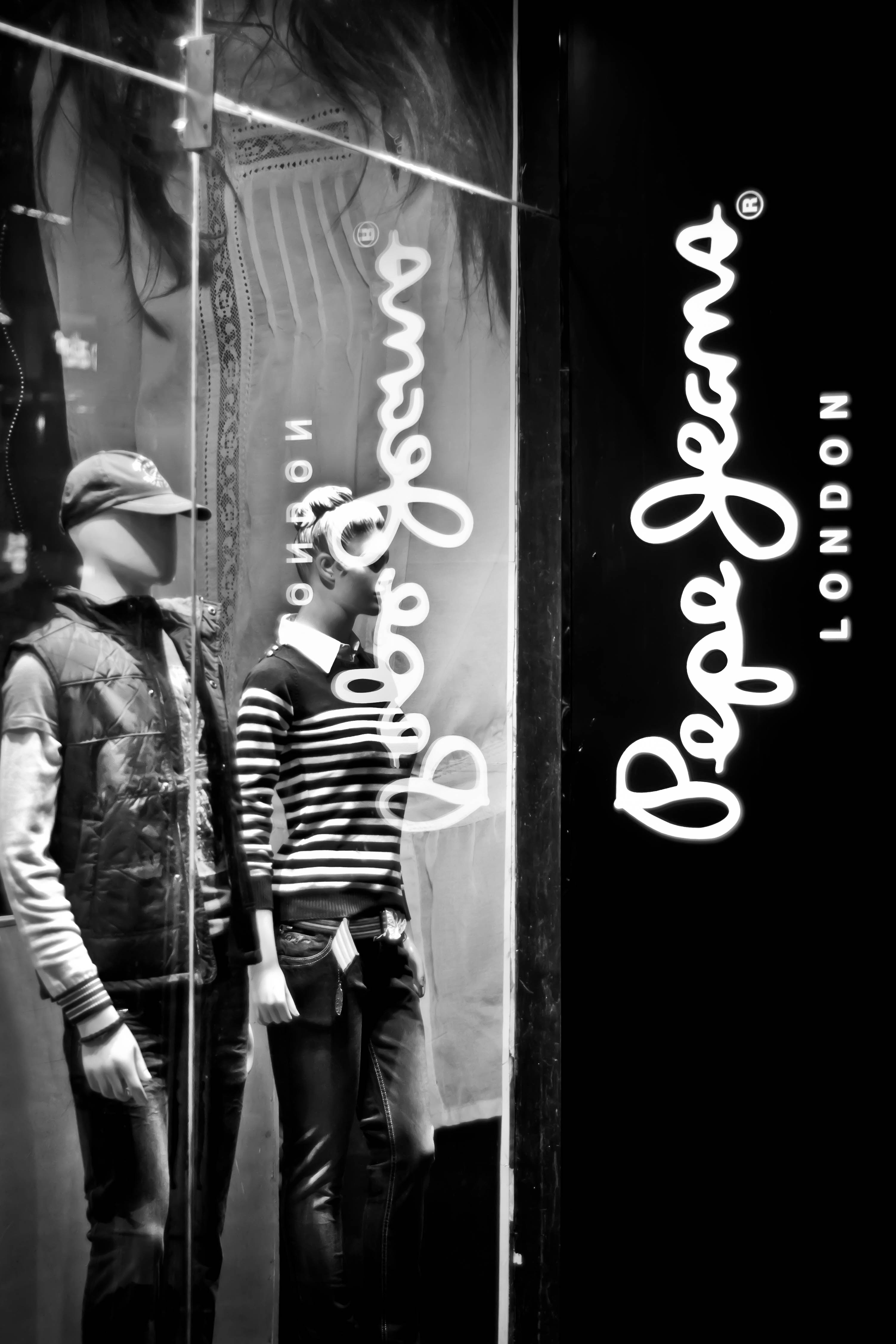
The Pepe Jeans showroom at Brigade Road (Bangalore, India)

Pepe Jeans London is a denim and casual wear jeans brand established in the Portobello Road area of London in 1973, and now based in Sant Feliu de Llobregat, Spain. It is currently owned by M1 Group, a holding company in Beirut, Lebanon.

Carlos Ortega was the CEO, and owns more than 20% of the company.

== History ==
Pepe Jeans was founded in 1973 by three brothers who ran a weekend stall at Portobello Road Market in London, before expanding to a store in Carnaby Street and then into Europe in the 1980s.

In 1988, Pepe Jeans was owned by Arun Shah, Nitin Shah, Milan Shah and Farook Jamal.

In February 2015, Pepe Jeans and Hackett London (part of the Pepe Jeans Group) were bought by the Lebanese M1 Group, and the LVMH subsidiary, L Capital Asia. These companies were previously owned by Torreal Funds (31 per cent), Artá Capital (16.4 per cent), L Capital Europe (11.5 per cent), and its managers.

In 2015, Pepe Jeans announced that the Group was adding a new brand, Norton Clothing, as a tribute to the British motorcycle brand founded in 1898.

In 2016, the group acquired the French fashion brand Façonnable.

In September 2019, Marcella Wartenbergh became CEO of Pepe Jeans Group. Also in 2019, Dua Lipa became a global ambassador for the brand.

In September 2023, Pepe Jeans celebrated its fifty years of existence in London with a photo exhibition of its many campaigns and a dinner in honor of its new ambassador, Lila Moss. Later, in December, Pepe Jeans announced its aim to develop in the Indian market, where it is already present with around 200 stores. Indeed, it plans to open over 100 new stores in the country over the next three years.

== Sponsorship ==
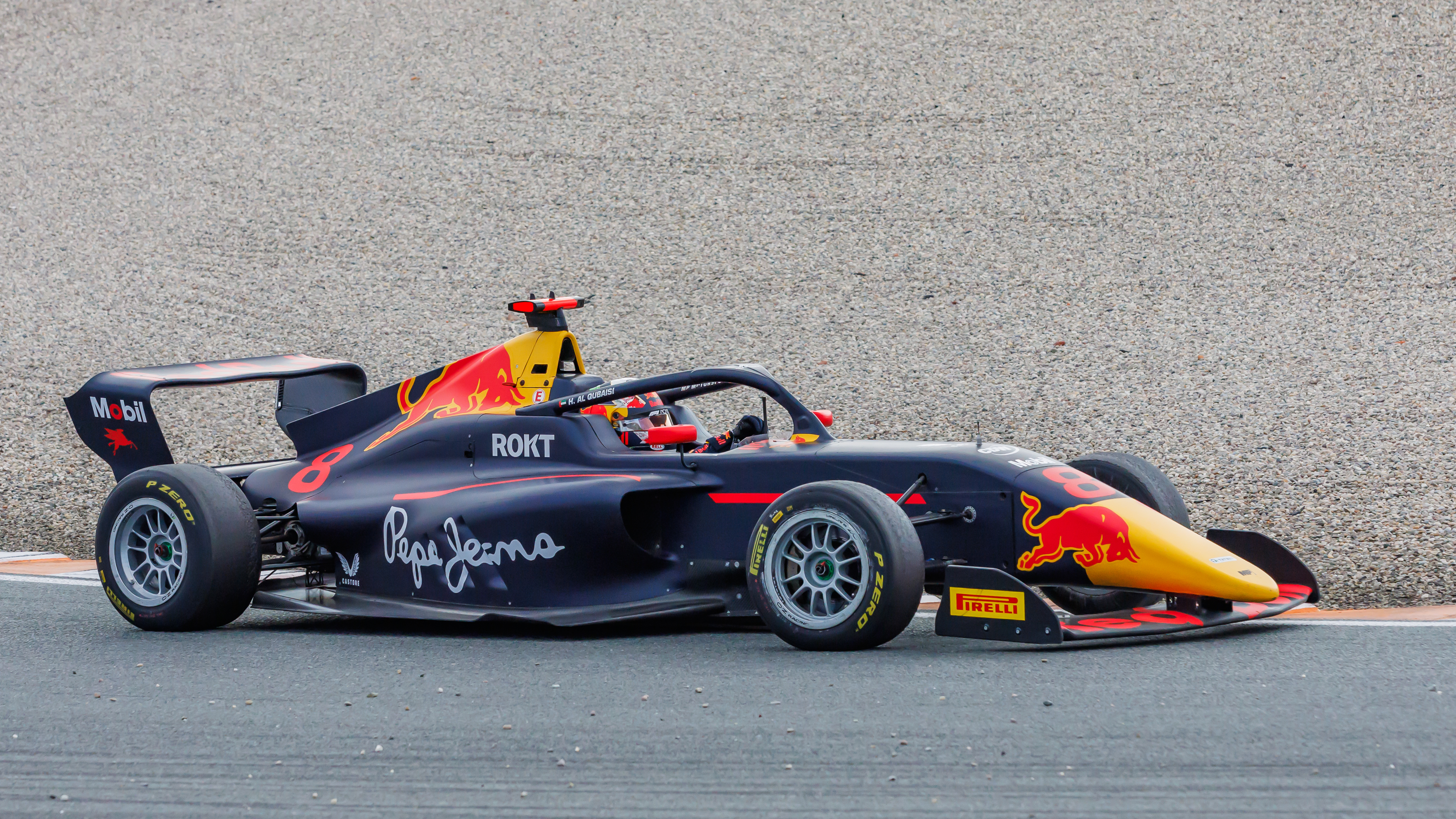
The Red Bull Racing Pepe Jeans Academy Programme car in F1 Academy

Pepe Jeans has been a sponsor of Red Bull Racing (RBR) in Formula One since 2010. In 2024, Pepe Jeans signed a title partnership deal with RBR to form the Red Bull Racing Pepe Jeans Academy Programme aimed at supporting RBR's entrants in F1 Academy, a female-only single-seater racing championship founded by Formula One.
