= Carlos Ortega (businessman) =

Spanish businessman

Carlos Ortega is a Spanish businessman. He was the former CEO of the Pepe Jeans Group, which also owns Hackett. Ortega owns more than 20% of Pepe Jeans Group. He was also mentioned in the Panama Papers.
