= Jean Aziz =

Lebanese politician, lawyer and poet

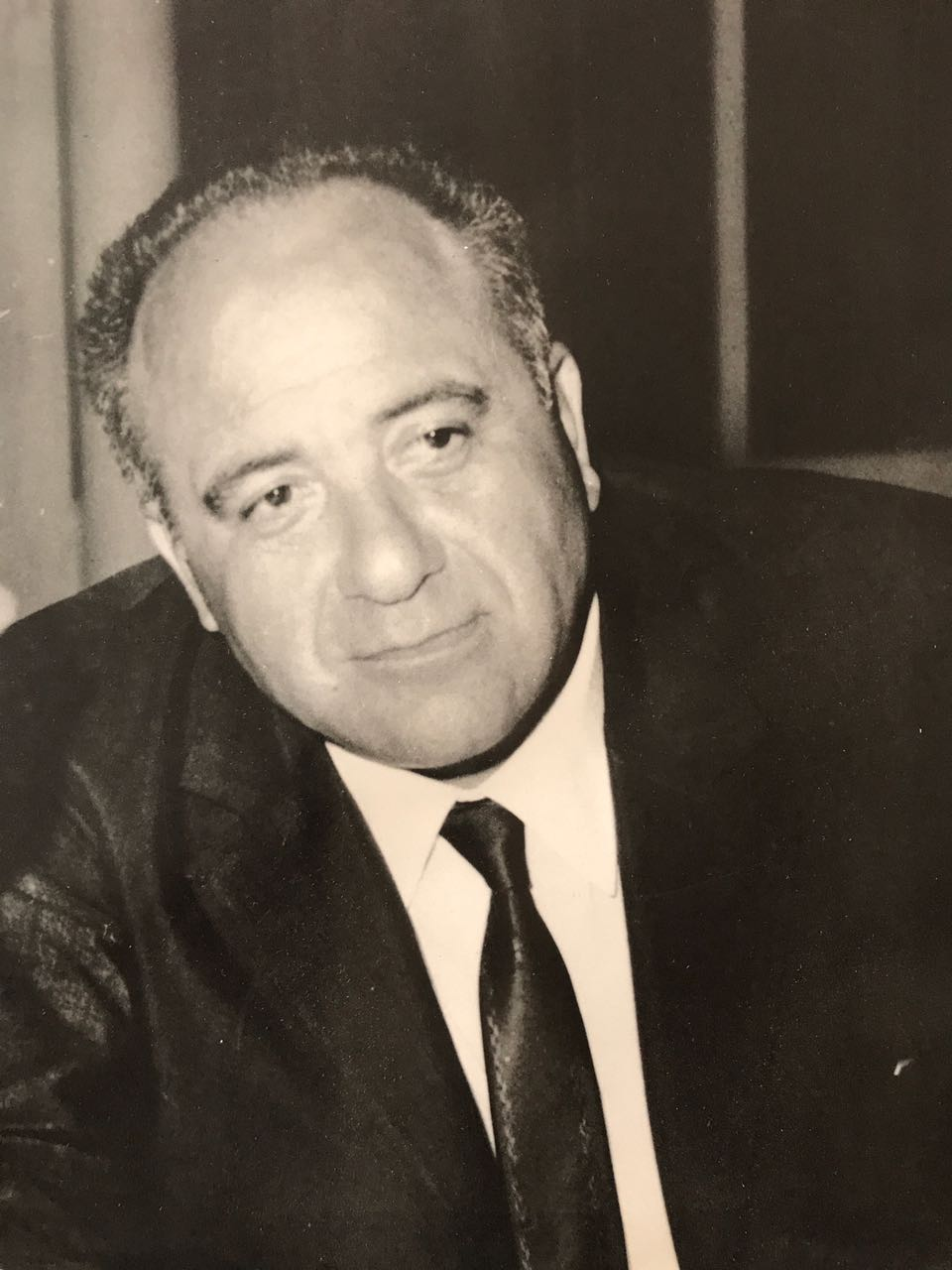
- Born: 24 June 1917; Jezzine
- Died: 13 March 1986
- Occupations: Politician, lawyer, poet

Jean Aziz (1917–1986) was a Lebanese politician, lawyer and poet. He began his career in Lebanon as a lawyer before becoming an active participant in politics. He was first elected as a member of parliament in 1957, representing Jezzine district city. He became known in particular as of 1958 for his advocacy for unity within various Lebanese sects. This led to his name being considered for the presidency.

Aziz was also recognised for his poetry whereby he was strongly influenced by French literature. He was remembered by a number of politicians for his eloquent political speeches as his written work influenced his abilities as a politician and judge.

On 13 March 1986, Jean Aziz died after suffering from diabetes.

== Early life ==
Jean Aziz was born on 24 June 1917 in Jezzine, Lebanon. He began his education at Ayantoora College before moving to Saint Joseph School in Beirut to continue his studies. He became a qualified lawyer as a result of his studies.

== Career ==
=== Law and Politics ===
Aziz's career began in the legal sector. He worked as a lawyer in Lebanon before being appointed as a judge in 1947.

Aziz began his political career when he became a member of parliament for Jezzine district in 1957 after collaborating with Farid Kozma in the parliamentary elections. He was re-elected in 1960, 1964 and 1968. His involvement increased a few years later when he was chosen to occupy the role of Minister of Labour and Social Affairs in President's Rashid Karamy's cabinet on 4 April 1961. During his term, he introduced and revised a number of influential laws regarding social security and social welfare in Lebanon.

Other positions that Aziz held included being selected as the Minister of Media and Planning in President's Abdallah Alyafy's cabinet from February to October 1968. He was also chosen to fulfil the role of the Minister of Communication and Public Works and he was mentioned as a potential presidential candidate, particularly in 1976. Aziz was also known for his close connection to President Fouad Chehab, Lebanon's third post-independence president. Aziz participated in establishing the parliamentary democratic front to endorse Chehab's presidency and acted as Secretary General of the Nahj Movement.

Throughout his political career, he upheld a strong belief in equality and solidarity between the different Lebanese factions. He usually indicated that he was not supporting one faction over the other, and he consistently attempted to dissolve ethnic conflicts in Lebanon, especially in the south. Aziz was reportedly an intermediary between factions during the 1975–1990 Lebanese Civil War and worked to protect Jezzine (a Christian enclave) during this turbulent time. He had good relations with the Saad family in Saida, the Junblat family in the Chouf and all of the numerous allied groups around the Palestinian Liberation Movement (PLO). One of the ways in which he was able to aid Jezzine and protect it from further conflict was when he initiated a pact between two prominent leaders in this region – Kamal Junblat and Maarouf Saad.

=== Poetry ===
While Aziz was most notably recognised for his influence in politics, he was also a poet. It was this love for poetry that aided his political orating skills as he believed that ‘politics and literature are two faces of one coin’.

His works were largely influenced by French politicians who also contributed to French literature such as Charles De Gaulle and Mauriac. One of his more well-known works titled ‘The Lights of the Night’ ("Azaher el-Leil") is used frequently by public figures in ceremonies. A book was composed of his poetry works and was published by Notre Dame University.

== Personal life ==
While his father worked as a wood trader in Mexico, Aziz's brother, Alfred Aziz, grew in recognition when he became a member of parliament in Mexico. He continued to gain this prominence in politics when he acted as the Speaker of the Mexican House of Representatives. Furthermore, Jean Aziz's late uncle (his mother Anissa's brother) was Patriarch Paul Meouchy, arguably one of the most prominent Maronite Patriarchs.

In his spare time, Aziz enjoyed reading. His favourite topics included poetry, philosophy and history.

On 13 March 1986, after struggling with diabetes, Aziz died. To allow for the prayers and religious traditions following his death, his body was moved from the American University's Hospital in Beirut to Saint Joseph Church in Ashrafyah. Aziz's funeral took place in Jezzine and despite the district being under siege, his funeral was attended by a large number of high ranking state officials such as ministers, religious personals and members of parliament.

He is the uncle of diplomat Simon Karm.
