= Jezzine =

Municipality in Southern Governorate

Jezzine جزين Jezzin
- Municipality
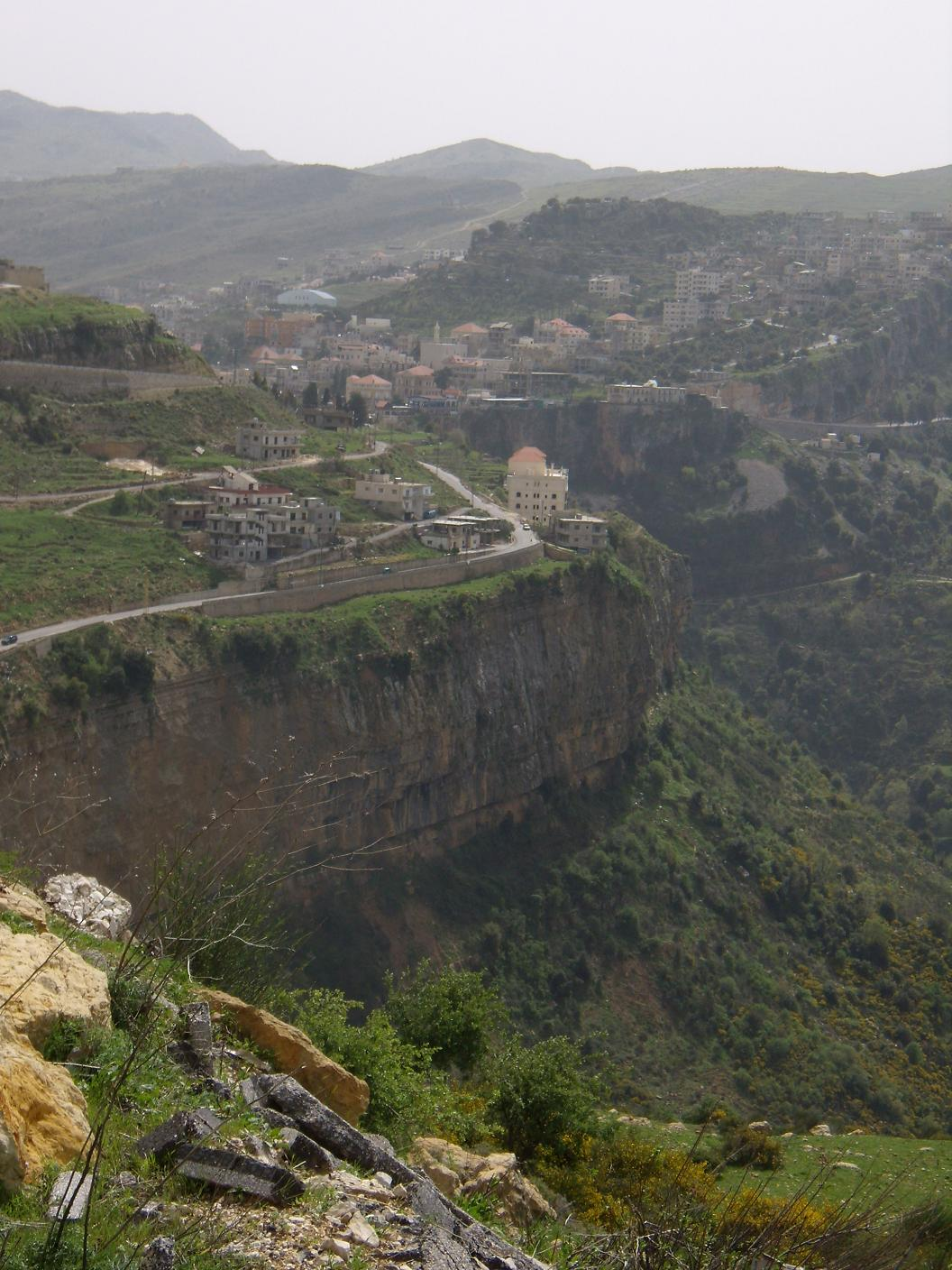

- Location in Lebanon
- Coordinates: 33°32′24″N 35°35′01″E
- Country: Lebanon
- Governorate: South Governorate
- District: Jezzine District
- Elevation: 950 m (3,120 ft)
- Time zone: UTC+2 (EET)
  - Summer (DST): UTC+3 (EEST)

Jezzine (Arabic: جزين Jizzīn) is a municipality in Lebanon, located 22 km (14 mi) from Sidon and 40 km (25 mi) south of Beirut. It is the capital of Jezzine District. Surrounded by mountain peaks, pine forests (like the Bkassine Pine Forest), and at an average altitude of 950 m (3,117 ft), it is the main summer resort and tourist destination of South Lebanon. The town is also known in Lebanon for the shrine of Our Lady of the Waterfall.

== Etymology ==
The name, Jezzine, derives from the Aramaic (Syriac) word, meaning "depot" or "store". Many historians believe that Jezzine served as a storing location for traders because of its strategic location on the caravan route that connected the ancient port city of Sidon to the Chouf, the Beqaa Valley, and to Syria.

== History ==
The Australian 7th Division, with British and Free French forces, supported by the Royal Australian Air Force, Royal Australian Navy, Royal Navy and Royal Air Force, fought for Jezzine against Vichy French forces in 1941.

Julián Slim Haddad (born Khalil Salim Haddad Aglamaz) was born in 1888 in Jezzine. He emigrated to Mexico when he was 14 years old to avoid being conscripted into the Army of the Ottoman Empire. After moving to Mexico City, Julián established a dry goods store—La Estrella de Oriente (The Star of the Orient). One of his sons,Carlos Slim Helú, born on 28 January 1940 in Mexico City, inherited his father's business talent and ultimately became the richest man in the world in 2007.

=== Modern era ===
Following the 1982 invasion of Lebanon, Jezzine became part of the Israeli ‘security zone’. On 9 April 1985 Sana'a Mehaidli—a member of the Syrian Social Nationalist Party—blew herself up next to an Israeli convoy in Jezzine killing 2 Israeli soldiers and inuring ten more. She may have been the first female suicide bomber, according to researchers. On 6 June 1992, two members of the South Lebanon Army (SLA) were killed by a roadside bomb near Jezzine. On 24 August 1995, fighting in Jezzine between the SLA and Hezbollah resulted in two Hezbollah fighters being killed. The following day, an IDF patrol in the area killed three more Hezbollah men.

Technically, Jezzine was not part of the security zone, but the town was the base for a South Lebanon Army (SLA) unit calling itself the 20th Battalion. The Israeli backed unit controlled five neighboring villages. In the spring of 1997, Hezbollah launched a five-month campaign attempting to cut off the SLA in Jezzine from the IDF and the other SLA forces further south. On 18 June, two SLA soldiers and an officer, as well as one civilian, were killed by a roadside bomb. In the aftermath, the IDF detained a number of youths in the town, and SLA commander-in-chief Antoine Lahad visited and made threats of “unspecified violence” if attacks continued. The following month, 17 July, the Israeli head of Northern Command—Major General Amiram Levin—visited the town in an attempt to bolster SLA morale. On 18 August, a roadside bomb killed two teenage children of a local SLA commander who had been previously killed four years earlier. The SLA responded with indiscriminate shelling of Sidon which killed seven civilians and wounded thirty-five. Earlier the same month, local notables, backed by Dory Chamoun, called on the government to move the Lebanese army into Jezzine, but without success. On 29 November, two SLA members were killed by a roadside bomb outside Jezzine.

In October 1998, it was reported that the population of Jezzine had fallen from 50,000 to around 3,000.

On 1 June 1999, the South Lebanon Army began dismantling its TV station and headquarters in Jezzine. In the following two weeks they withdrew from the town and thirty six surrounding villages. Retreating SLA members and their families commandeered empty houses in Marjayun, Ibl al-Saqi and Kawkaba in the Indian UNIFIL zone. At the time, it was estimated that the SLA had only four hundred men.

== Demographics ==
In 2014, Christians made up 99.11% of registered voters in Jezzine. 83.37% of the voters were Maronite Catholics and 10.15% were Greek Catholics.

The number of inhabitants in Jezzine is about 16 thousand.

== Culture ==
Festivals

The Feast of the Assumption of the Virgin Mary is celebrated on August 15 of each year with religious and cultural festivities.

Libraries

The Jezzine Public Library was built in 1960 and underwent refurbishment in 2004.

Theatres

Empire Jezzine, the local movie theatre, played Hollywood and Lebanese films. (Permanently closed)

== Economy ==
Agriculture

The production of pine nuts is the main agriculture product of Bkassine, the neighbor of Jezzine.

Handcrafts

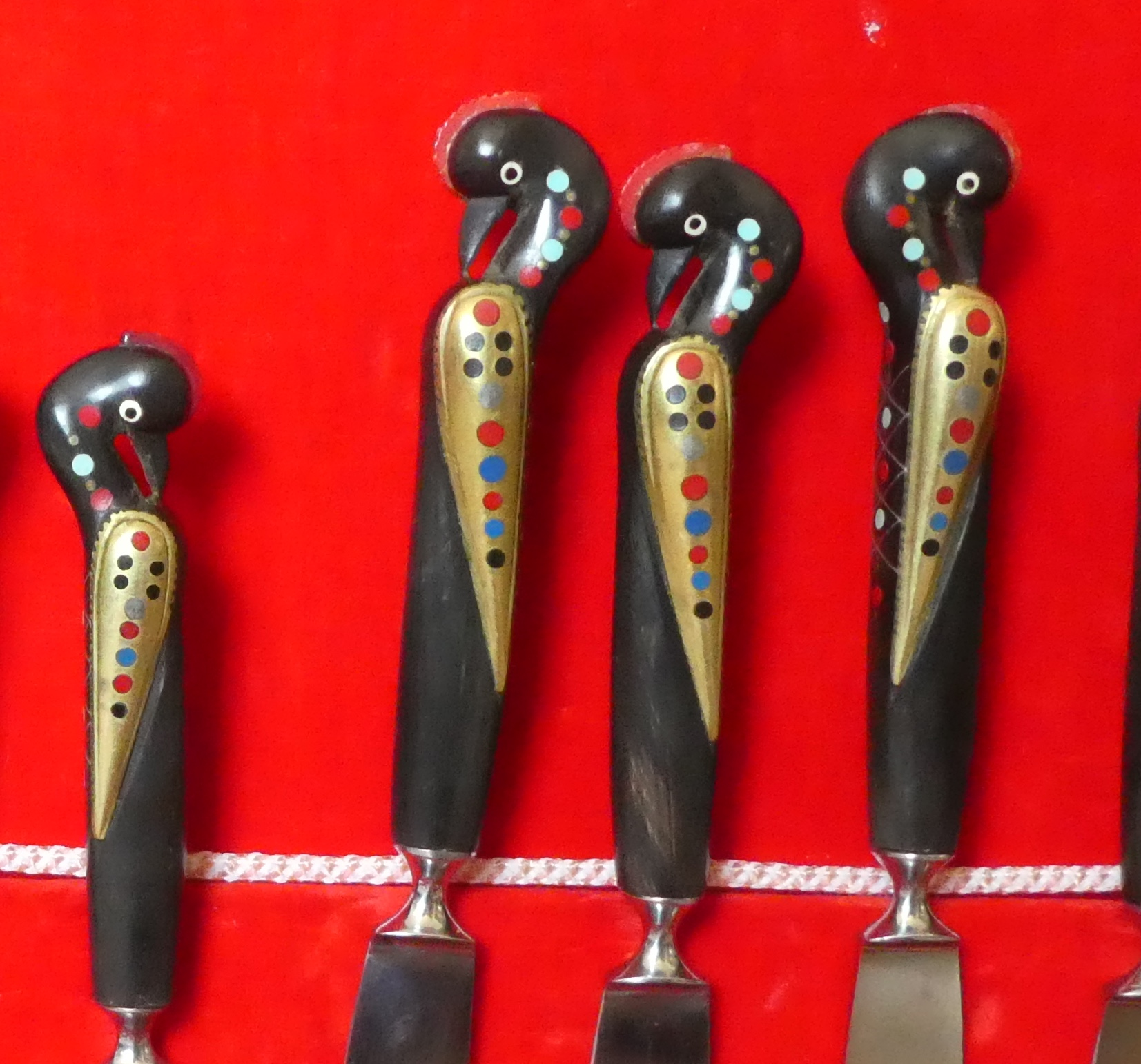
Jezzine cutlery

Jezzine is known for its handcrafted knives and other cutlery, made of inlaid mosaics and bone. The cutlery has been presented as gifts to dignitaries all over the world as a memento of Lebanon. The first family who produced this cutlery is the el Haddad family and started the company in 1770. The latest was Samir Haddad, who died in 2015 at the age of 84. He was praised for his skills and art by many people.

Tourism

Jezzine is a summer resort in South Lebanon. The town is located on the slopes of Tumat Niha and its landscape features pine-forested valleys and mountain summits, vineyards, orchards, ponds, and waterfalls. The town is known as the "City of Falls" because of its waterfalls, the Jezzine Falls.

Emigration

Like most towns on Mount Lebanon, Jezzine has a sizeable diaspora, especially in Latin America and West Africa. The Aziz and Slim families have built sizeable businesses in Mexico, as well as the Karam and Wehbe families in West Africa.

== Attractions ==
At the entrance of Jezzine, there is "Saydet Jezzine" or "Saydet el-Maabour" (Our Lady of Jezzine) shrine (Arabic: سيدة المعبور); inside it lies the Christian statue of the Virgin. In 1955, the Virgin Statue was erected during religions celebrations that occur on August 15, the day of the Virgin's Assumption. In the center of the town there is the Municipal Palace, which was built according to the Ottoman style in 1898 during the reign of Sultan Abd el Hamid and the "Qaim Maqam" of the district, Saleem Bey Aammoun, at the expense of the municipality.

On the outskirts of the town is St. Maroun Church, which dates back to the 18th century. It was partially destroyed in 1759, and then repaired several times.

The churches in Jezzine are:

- Saydet el-Yanbou' Church (built in 1796): It includes a valuable icon of the Virgin and her Baby, Jesus (painted by the Italian artist "Piarotti"). It is placed on a vaulted marble altar.
- St. Anthony Church (built in the 19th century): it has a central chapel beside which there are two other chapels.
- St. Joseph Church (built in 1860): its architecture and vaults have no central columns, and is divided into two parts: The first (for men) is higher than the other part (for women).

South of Jezzine lays Sirhal Palace, a huge building whose architecture is nontraditional. It was built by Dr. Farid Sirhal. The Palace includes spacious rooms topped with perforated glass colored vaults, as well as shapes of engraved water-springs. It is visible from the Ain Majdalein road, but is not open for visitors.

Karam Wines, Southern Lebanon's only winery, owns land in the area where they primarily grow Syrah and Cabernet Sauvignon.

== Landmarks ==
- Jezzine's Waterfalls, some as high as 90 m (295 ft)
- Our Lady of the Waterfall, a Marian shrine
- The 400-year-old Kanaan Family Palace
- The Farid Serhal Palace
- The Chir cliff has views of the forested mountains and one of Jezzine's waterfalls that drops 90 m over the cliff.
- The Grotto of Fakhreddin II

== Notable people ==
- Joseph Azar (singer)
- Raymond Azar, the head of the Lebanese military intelligence.
- Jean Aziz (1917), Minister of Labour and Social Affairs (1961), Minister of Media and Planning (1968), Minister of Communication and Public Works. Also a known poet and lawyer.
- Darine Chahine, talk show host
- Ounsi el-Hajj (1937–2014), poet, journalist, translator
- Sleiman Hajjar, the Melkite Catholic bishop of Canada
- Fares Karam, musician
- Simon Karam, lawyer and diplomat
- Damianos Kattar, politician
- Karen Maron (1980), war correspondent, renamed the most influential journalists covering armed violence by Action on Armed Violence (AOAV), international analyst and writer
- Paul Peter Meouchi (1894), 74th Maronite Patriarch of Antioch from 1955 until his death in 1975 and a cardinal of the Catholic Church
- Gabrielle Bou Rached (1985), Miss Lebanon
- Carlos Slim (1940), Mexican business magnate, investor and philanthropist
