= M1 Group =

Investment holdings company in Lebanon

- Company type: Private
- Industry: Finance, investment
- Founded: 2007; 18 years ago
- Founder: Taha Mikati; Najib Mikati
- Headquarters: Beirut, Lebanon
- Key people: Azmi Mikati (CEO)
- Website: www.m1group.com

M1 Group is a diversified investment holdings group based in Beirut, Lebanon. Its CEO is Azmi Mikati.

== History ==
In 2007, the Mikati brothers founded M1 Group, which now comprises:

- M1 Real Estate which owns real estate in Europe, the United States and the Middle East
- M1 Fashion which owns several clothing brands including Façonnable, Pepe jeans and Hackett London

== Myanmar ==
According to a UN-report from 2019, Irrawaddy Green Towers has business interest with the Myanmar military through Mytel, M1 Group, is one of the shareholders along with the International Finance Corporation (IFC) in Irrawaddy Green Towers. The Burma Campaign UK placed M1 Group, along with Google, Apple and many other international companies on their "dirty list", M1 was placed due to being "a major shareholder in Irrawaddy Green Towers, a mobile phone tower company which works for the military joint venture Mytel."

After the 2021 Myanmar coup d'état, the Military junta told telecom companies in Myanmar that "they had until Monday July 5 to fully implement intercept technology they had previously been asked to install to let authorities spy on calls, messages and web traffic and to track users by themselves". Under these circumstances Telenor found it impossible to stay in the country, and proposed to sell its Myanmar business to the M1 group for $105 million.
