= 2026 Israel–Lebanon peace talks =

Bilateral talks between Israel and Lebanon

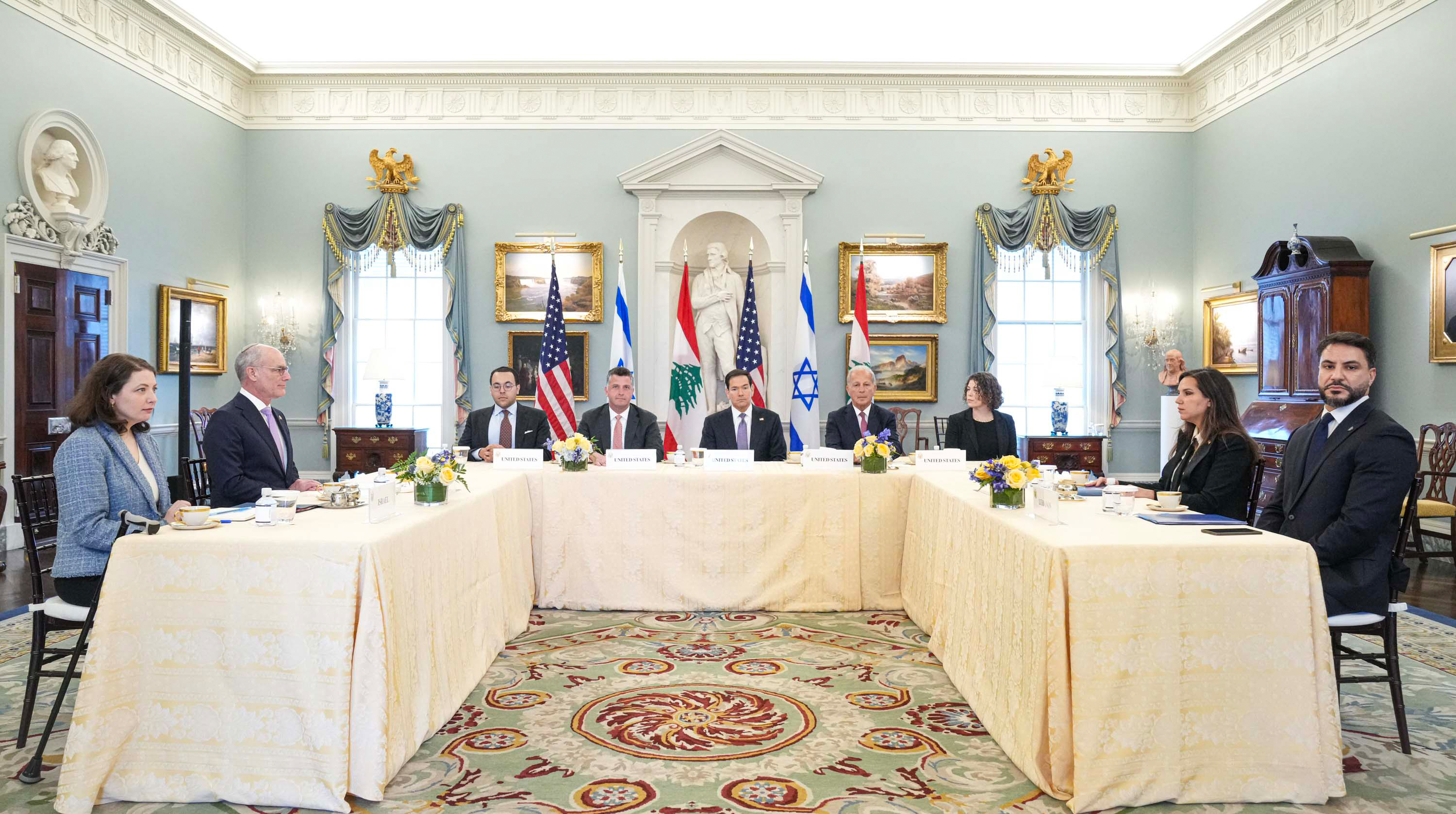
Secretary Marco Rubio, Israeli Ambassador to the United States Yechiel Leiter, and Lebanese Ambassador to the United States Nada Hamadeh Moawad at the Department of State in Washington, D.C., April 14, 2026.

The Israel–Lebanon peace talks are diplomatic contacts that opened between Israel and Lebanon during 2026, following the renewed fighting between Israel and Hezbollah. For the first time since the failure of the May 17 Agreement (1983), Israel and the Lebanese government announced the opening of direct negotiations with the goal of reaching a peace agreement and disarming Hezbollah.

Under a framework agreement reached on 26 June 2026, and brokered by the United States, the two countries would implement security measures under which the Israeli Defense Forces would withdraw from Southern Lebanon and be replaced by units of the Lebanese Armed Forces, who would oversee the disarmament of Hezbollah's armed units.

== Background ==
=== 20th century ===
Before the establishment of Israel and Lebanon as independent states, relations between local communities were diverse, and at times, even cooperative. An active Jewish community in Lebanon, particularly in Beirut, maintained religious, cultural, and economic ties with communities in the Four Holy Cities. Zionist organizations developed educational and political connections in Lebanon, and some Lebanese groups, especially the Maronites, supported cooperation with a future Jewish state. They drew inspiration from the Hebrew Bible's description of an alliance between King Hiram of Tyre and ancient Israel under David and Solomon, involving the exchange of craftsmen and cedar wood for the construction of the Jerusalem Temple in return for food supplies. However, Lebanon's independence in 1943 under a more pan-Arab leadership led to increasing official opposition to Zionism. During the 1948 Arab–Israeli War, Lebanon declared itself a belligerent but largely assumed a defensive role. The 1949 armistice agreement established that the ceasefire line between Israel and Lebanon would follow the existing boundary rather than create a new one, and it was mutually recognized as such. Unlike many other Arab countries, Lebanon did not systematically persecute its Jewish population after 1948, and the community initially continued to function before gradually declining due to instability.

From the late 1960s, the situation deteriorated as Palestinian militant organizations began operating from Lebanese territory. After the events of 'Black September' in 1970, which saw the Jordanian government clashing with the Palestine Liberation Organization (PLO), they relocated to Lebanon, contributing to the destabilization and violence that led to the Lebanese Civil War (1975–1990). In 1978 Israel invaded southern Lebanon in response to the coastal road massacre near Tel Aviv by Palestinian militants based in Lebanon, withdrawing later the same year. Following the Egypt–Israel peace treaty of 1979, Israeli leaders hoped for a similar agreement with Lebanon. In 1982, after a Palestinian group attempted to assassinate Israel's ambassador to the UK, Israel launched "Operation Peace for Galilee", later known as the First Lebanon War, invading the country to target PLO infrastructure and beginning a prolonged military occupation of southern Lebanon through the "Security Zone". An Israel–Lebanon agreement signed in 1983, intended to normalize relations, collapsed in 1984 due to internal opposition and the pressure of Ba'athist Syria, which was backed militarily by the Soviet Union. In the following decades, conflict centered largely on Hezbollah, an Islamist Shi'ite militant and political organization founded and backed by Iran. Israel withdrew from southern Lebanon in 2000 after roughly 18 years of presence, after which the UN delineated the 'Blue Line'.

=== 21st century ===
Tensions persisted into the 21st century. The 2006 Lebanon War, triggered by a Hezbollah cross-border raid and the abudction of two Israeli soldiers, ended with UN Security Council Resolution 1701, which stipulated that no armed groups other than the Lebanese army and UNIFIL operate south of the Litani River. In 2022, Israel and Lebanon reached a maritime border demarcation agreement regulating economic zones in the eastern Mediterranean. Following the Hamas-led October 7 attacks in southern Israel, Hezbollah opened a parallel front along Israel's northern border, leading to repeating exchanges of fire. In September 2024, Israel launched a series of attacks that decapitated Hezbollah's leadership and diminished its military capabilities, including the assassination of its longtime leader, Hassan Nasrallah. A ceasefire was reached in November 2024 after months of fighting. Following this, Hezbollah has rebuilt its military capabilities in violation of the ceasefire, and Israel continued to carry out airstrikes against what it said was Hezbollah infrastructure. In 2025, a new Lebanese government under President Joseph Aoun and Prime Minister Nawaf Salam declared its intention to strengthen state sovereignty and limit non-state armed actors; since then, it has taken legal steps to restrict Hezbollah's influence and approved plans to disarm the group. Nevertheless, Hezbollah opposes the government's policy, and remains a central force in Lebanon's politics. During the Iran war that began on 28 February 2026, Hezbollah entered the conflict end launched more than 1,300 waves of attack on Israel, aligning with its longtime backer Iran, and contributing to a renewed escalation along the Israel–Lebanon front. In response, Israel launched another invasion of southern Lebanon.

== Peace talks ==
In April 2026, reports emerged that Israel and Lebanon had begun exploring the possibility of direct negotiations between the two countries. On 9 April 2026, Israeli Prime Minister Benjamin Netanyahu announced that the political-security cabinet had directed the opening of contacts with the Lebanese government. According to the government statement, the talks were intended to address security and political issues between the two countries, including stability along the northern border, the status of armed organizations in Lebanon, and the possibility of a broader political arrangement.

At the same time, Lebanese officials declared that the country was open to examining security and diplomatic arrangements that would reduce tensions along the border. Lebanese President Joseph Aoun noted in several statements that Lebanon seeks a stable ceasefire and a long-term arrangement for the situation on the southern border. According to reports in the Lebanese media, the government in Beirut began exploring the formation of political and security teams to discuss border and security issues.

Statements from Lebanese officials focused primarily on the need to strengthen state sovereignty and consolidate institutional control over the security situation in the south. In this context, government figures emphasized that any future political contact would be based on existing international resolutions, including Security Council Resolution 1701, and on the principle of full Lebanese sovereignty over the country's territory. As part of Lebanon's focus on strengthening state sovereignty, PM Nawaf Salam rejected Iran proposal to negotiate on its behalf.

On 12 April it was reported that a notable preparatory virtual meeting was held between all parties, which included Nada Hamadeh Moawad, Yechiel Leiter, Michel Issa, and Michael Needham.

On 14 April, the first meeting of the peace talks—involving the Israeli, Lebanese, and U.S. ambassadors, along with Michael Needham and ambassador to the UN Mike Waltz—was hosted in Washington by secretary of state Marco Rubio. Israeli Prime Minister Benjamin Netanyahu stated "we want the dismantling of Hezbollah's weapons, and we want a real peace agreement that will last for generations." On the Lebanese side, President Joseph Aoun declared he hoped the Washington talks will yield "an agreement...on a ceasefire in Lebanon, with the aim of starting direct negotiations between Lebanon and Israel." Lebanese ambassador Nada Hamadeh Moawad called the meeting "constructive", but stated she had also called for a ceasefire and insisted on "the full sovereignty of the state over all Lebanese land". Foreign ministers from 17 countries, (including Britain and France), encouraged Lebanon and Israel to seize the chance to bring lasting security to the region. Following the talks, Israel and Lebanon have agreed to direct negotiations for the future.

In addition to being an opportunity for Lebanon and Israel, the peace talks are also seen as an opportunity for the US. After the failure of Islamabad Talks and Hamas’s apparent rejection of the Gaza demilitarization plan proposed by Board of Peace representative Nickolay Mladenov, the Israel-Lebanon talks may be the only near-term chance for U.S. diplomacy to translate military success into diplomatic achievement. On 16 April, President Trump announced that Israel and Lebanon agreed to a 10-day truce.

A second round of talks took place in Washington on 23 April, 2026. Lebanon asked to extend the ceasefire, as Israel stated it had no large disagreements with Lebanon, calling it to work together against the pro-Iran Hezbollah. President Trump chaired the talks.

A third round of talks took place in Washington on 14 and 15 May, 2026. The Lebanese delegation was led by Simon Karam. Lebanese officials are hoping that the two-day negotiations will yield a new ceasefire deal and pave the way for tackling a series of issues, including the withdrawal of Israeli forces from southern Lebanon and the disarmament of Hezbollah. The Israeli delegation was led by Yechiel Leiter, the Israeli Ambassador to the United States. Following that round, it was decided to prolong the ceasefire in Lebanon by additional 45 days.

On May 29, there was a military coordination meeting between Lebanese, Israeli and American military delegations at the Pentagon. The topics discussed were the Israeli army withdrawal, the Lebanese army takeover of Southern Lebanon, the financial support for the Lebanese army, the disarmament of Hezbollah, and the enforcement mechanism for the ceasefire.

A fourth round of talks took place in Washington DC on 2 and 3 June, 2026. The two main axes of discussion were the enforcement of the ceasefire and the "move versus move" mechanism between Lebanon and Israel. The ceasefire was confirmed. Moreover, it was agreed to create "pilot zones" from which Israeli troops were to withdraw to let the Lebanese army takeover. These "pilot zones" will be free of any weapons not belonging to the Lebanese army. In addition, it was agreed to declare the Hezbollah, enemy of Lebanon. Also, it was decided that Lebanon and Israel act towards each others without any hostility. Finally, it was agreed to meet again for a 5th round of talks on June 23, 24 and 25. This meeting would have a political portion and a military portion. A framework agreement for the dismantling of Hezbollah and an Israeli withdrawal was signed on June 26.

== Framework agreement ==
A framework agreement brokered by the United States was signed on 26 June 2026 in Washington, D.C. by representatives of Israel and Lebanon, which would implement security measures along their shared border. As part of the framework, the Israeli Defense Forces would withdraw from Southern Lebanon and be replaced by units of the Lebanese Armed Forces, who would then be responsible for the disarmament of Hezbollah, under the oversight of the United States and other international entities. The two countries affirmed the right of each nation to "live in peace" and to "live in security as neighboring sovereign states". International action between the two countries against each other would be ended, along with exchanges of prisoners and remains.

Naim Qassem, Secretary-General of Hezbollah, called the framework a surrender to Israel and rejected the agreement as "null and void", saying that Hezbollah would not disarm and would continue fighting against Israel. Member of the Parliament of Lebanon, international law expert and human rights activist, Halima Kaakour, told to the Middle East Eye that Lebanon and the Lebanese people have the right to seek reparations over Israel's violations committed in the country and criticized the framework agreement as it "disregards that right and deprives the Lebanese people of justice. The right to justice is more important than any agreement."

Another round of negotiations took place in Rome, Italy on 14 and 15 July. Lebanese president Joseph Aoun visited the US on 21 July to meet with President Trump. Another round of negotiations began in Rome on August 4. Following the August round, it was decided to resume negotiations in October. Another round of negotiations took place in Tampa, Florida on 20/21 October. They were conducted by military delegations examining technical issues. The different delegations did not meet in the same room. The Lebanese delegation asked for a reduction in Israeli military operations. The Israeli delegation asked for direct coordination between the Lebanese and Israeli armies. There were discussions about how to move forward with the "pilot zones." The Israelis have questioned whether the Lebanese army can handle its part of the framework agreement in terms of taking control of large areas of Lebanon.

== Reactions ==
=== Support ===
- Joseph Aoun, President of Lebanon stated that "the only solution to the situation in Lebanon is a ceasefire with Israel that will lead to direct negotiations between the two countries", and noted that the diplomatic initiative is already receiving positive responses on the international stage.
- Nawaf Salam, Prime Minister of Lebanon said that "Beirut was open to discussing any agenda, format or location for talks".
- Samir Geagea, leader of the Lebanese Forces party, called for strengthening state sovereignty in Lebanon and disarming Hezbollah, arguing that the country cannot stabilize as long as the organization maintains an independent military force.
- Yechiel Leiter, Israel's Ambassador to the United States, was quoted telling the Lebanese people: "We want to live with you in peace and harmony, we have no interest in your land, only in our security". He also expressed hope that next year their country would join the Abraham Accords.
- Nabih Berri, Speaker of the Lebanese Parliament and leader of the Amal Movement, according to Lebanese political sources, expressed support in principle for opening negotiations, while awaiting Hezbollah's position on the matter.

=== Oppose ===
- Ali Fayyad, a Hezbollah member of the Lebanese parliament said that the organization opposes direct negotiations with Israel and stressed that any political discussion must first be contingent on a ceasefire and the withdrawal of Israeli forces from Lebanese territory.

== See also ==
- 2026 Israel–Lebanon ceasefire
- 2026 Israel–Lebanon Framework Agreement
