= Mustapha Adib (diplomat) =

Lebanese academic, diplomat, politician

- مصطفى أديب
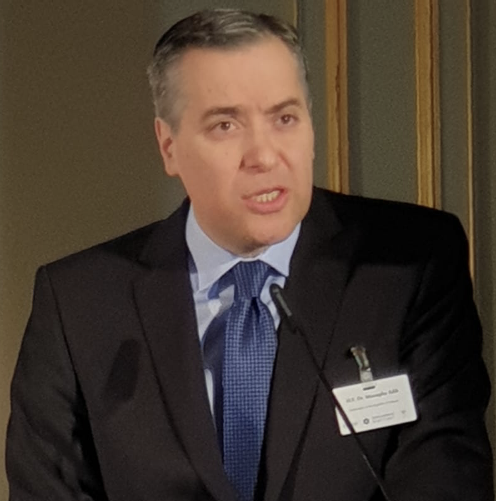

Lebanese Ambassador to Germany
- Incumbent
- Assumed office 11 July 2013
- President: Michel Suleiman; Michel Aoun

Chief of Staff of the Prime Minister of Lebanon
- In office 13 June 2011 – 11 July 2013
- Prime Minister: Najib Mikati

Personal details
- Born: Mustapha Abdul Wahed Adib; 30 August 1972 (age 54) Tripoli, Lebanon
- Party: Independent
- Spouse: Flavia D'Amato
- Children: 5
- Education: University of Montpellier (PhD)
- Occupation: Diplomat; politician; academic
- Profession: Philosopher

Mustapha Adib Abdul Wahed (Arabic: مصطفى عبد الواحد أديب; born 30 August 1972) is a Lebanese diplomat, politician and academic who has served as Lebanese Ambassador to Germany since 11 July 2013. In 2020, he was chosen as the prime minister-designate but stepped down when he failed to form a cabinet. He is well known for his academic research and expertise work in the fields of Human and State Security, Electoral laws and parliamentary oversight of the security sector.

== Biography ==
Mustapha Adib Abdul Wahed was born on 30 August 1972 in the northern city of Tripoli in North Lebanon. He is a Sunni Muslim.

== Career ==
Mustapha who is a native of Tripoli, completed a PhD doctorate degree in law and political science from the University of Montpellier with summa cum laude 4.0 GPA. He pursued his career in teaching at Beirut War College in 2000 and has also taught subjects including Public international law, Constitutional law, International relations and Geopolitics at various other universities in Lebanon and France. He was appointed as the full time professor at the Lebanese University as well.

In 2004, he became the President of the Centre d'études stratégiques pour le moyen-orient (CESMO), and since then had conducted numerous studies with the UN, Generic Center for Civilian Control of Armed Forces.

He was also closely associated with former Lebanese Prime Minister Najib Mikati and also served as his adviser from 2000 to 2004. He also served as one of the members of the committee in charge of amending new electoral law of Lebanon in 2005 and 2006. In 2011, he was appointed by the then PM Najib Mikati as the chief of his cabinet. On 18 July 2013, he was appointed as the ambassador of Lebanon to Germany.

He was appointed on September 1, 2024 Permanent Delegate for Lebanon a.i. to UNESCO in Paris. On 28 January 2025, he was nominated for the International Court of Justice.

=== Prime minister-designate ===
On 30 August 2020, he was backed by the Future Movement of Lebanon and a group of former Lebanese prime ministers to take up the post of PM. He was nominated for the position while serving as the Lebanese ambassador to Germany in order to replace Hassan Diab who resigned on 10 August 2020 due to the outcry and uproar following the 2020 Beirut explosion which killed nearly 200 people. Mustapha was reported to have received support of major parties such as Free Patriotic Movement to form a new cabinet. Former PM Najib Mikati became the first politician to nominate Mustapha Adib for the position. He was also the only candidate to have been nominated for the position as of 30 August 2020 and his nomination was reported to have been approved by French President Emmanuel Macron who was due to arrive in Lebanon for peace talks and discussions about political reforms in Lebanon. On 31 August 2020, he was formally appointed as the new designated PM of Lebanon a day prior to the deadline (1 September 2020) set by the French President who demanded for a political change in the country free of corruption. His appointment came in just few hours prior to the visit by Emmanuel Macron. He received support from 90 of 120 MPs to become the new Prime Minister of Lebanon and to form the government on 31 August 2020.

Nearly a month later, on 26 September 2020, he stepped down from the role after failing to form a government.

== Honours and awards ==
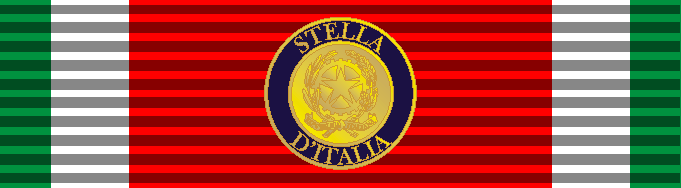
- Officer of the Order of the Star of Italy
- Commander of the National Order of the Cedar
