= John Michael Ingram =

British fashion designer and retailer (1931–2014)

- John Michael Ingram (photo by Frank Hermann)
- Born: 1 February 1931; London, England
- Died: 13 June 2014 (aged 83)
- Occupations: Menswear designer and retailer; founder of fashion forecasting agency

John Michael Ingram (1 February 1931 – 13 June 2014) was an influential British menswear designer and retailer of the 1950s and '60s who founded the John Michael fashion brand, followed by a range of successful retail concepts, before establishing one of the first fashion forecasting agencies in the 1970s.

He has also been credited as one of the pioneers behind the rise of the King's Road, Chelsea, as a fashion destination. In an interview for the magazine Drapers, former Moss Bros managing director Manny Silverman described Ingram as "one of the leading commercially innovative retailers of the 1960s; always a leader, never a follower. Without him, the King's Road might never have happened."

== Early life and career ==
John Michael Ingram was born into a fashion family; his parents owned the King's Road store Wakeford's, which specialised in dressing debutantes and their mothers. He left school at 16 and joined the family firm as a buyer, demonstrating a keen eye for ensuring Wakeford's brand identity and in sourcing textiles.

== Establishment of retail brand ==
In 1957, Ingram opened his first menswear store in Chelsea, just down the road from Mary Quant's Bazaar, and sold men's shirts in unusual prints and fabrics, such as Swiss voile and gingham, targeting younger buyers who were keen to wear clothing inspired by Italian menswear trends.

The influence of John Michael's fashion grew rapidly. The first menswear editor of British Vogue, Aqualina Ross, has recalled how he walked into a store that felt like heaven, with clothing in bright colours, lightweight fabrics, and youthful cuts–a huge move forward from the typical clothing sold in department stores and small menswear shops of the West End. Ross bought a baby blue seersucker jacket that day and noticed that soon London's top advertising creatives were all clothed in similar John Michael seersucker jackets.

Ingram's King's Road shop was followed by Sportique, a store on Old Compton Street, Soho, next door to the influential coffee bar-cum-music venue 2i's. Thanks in part to its location and its stock, the store attracted members of the music scene, including The Beatles, The Who, The Rolling Stones, and Marc Bolan. Its clothes were also worn by the London creative set, including David Hockney, Francis Bacon, and Peter Cook; although Alan Bennett and Malcolm McLaren were not persuaded, McClaren described the Sportique style as "a bit too subversive".

Where the creative scene led, a new market followed–not only young professionals but Mod teenagers–and Ingram's retail empire expanded to include a larger store in King's Road and stores in upmarket locations such as Bond Street and St Ann's Arcade, Manchester.

=== Savile Row ===
During 1965, the John Michael empire became a PLC with 17 stores and was a flag-bearer for Swinging London, stocked alongside Mary Quant in J.C. Penney, as well as being exported across Europe and to Japan. Ingram opened a head office in Savile Row, home of traditional British men's tailoring, where he created updated versions of men's suits. One of these suits, known as'spirit of old Broadcasting House' (a reference to the BBC), is now in the V&A archive. Ingram also consulted for other manufacturers and employed people who would go on to establish their own successful tailoring brands, notably Jeremy Hackett and Tom Gilbey. By 1971, Ingram's retail brands also included the store Guys and Dolls and the jeans store Westerner, one of the first dedicated jeans stores in the UK.

== Design forecasting ==
During the mid-1970s, Ingram moved out of fashion retail and established the fashion forecasting agency Design Intelligence, which published guides to fashion trends. As a fashion forecaster, he was revered for his track record in retailing and renowned for his ability to deliver commercial lines to fashion retailers at a time when few companies had their own in-house design teams. Ingram continued working at Design Intelligence up to the age of 81.
