= Selim Tadmoury =

Selim Tadmoury was selected as the Permanent Representative of Lebanon to the United Nations on July 30, 1999.

== Early life, family, and education ==
Selim Tadmoury was born in Tripoli, Lebanon in 1938. He has a wife and one child. He graduated in private law and public law from the University of Rabat in Morocco after obtaining a Master of Arts in history.

== Career ==
From 1974 to 1978, Selim Tadmoury served in Lebanese embassies at Morocco and Egypt. He was also Counsellor at the embassy in Austria and Deputy Representative to the specialized agencies of the United Nations in Vienna. From 1977 to 1978, he served as deputy director in his country's Department of Economic Affairs. From 1978 to 1983, he served as Deputy Permanent Representative to the United Nations in New York City. From 1980 to 1982, he was also Deputy Chief of the Lebanese delegation to the United Nations Conference on the Law of the Sea. From 1983 to 1985, he was the Lebanese Ambassador to China. From 1985 to 1987, he was Chef du Service des Étrangers in Lebanon's Department of Political Affairs. From 1987 to 1990, Selim Tadmoury was the ambassador to Turkey. From 1990 to 1999, he was the Ambassador to the Russian Federation. In 1999, he was selected as the Permanent Representative of Lebanon to the United Nations.
