= Nada Hamadeh Moawad =

Lebanese diplomat and Ambassador to the United States

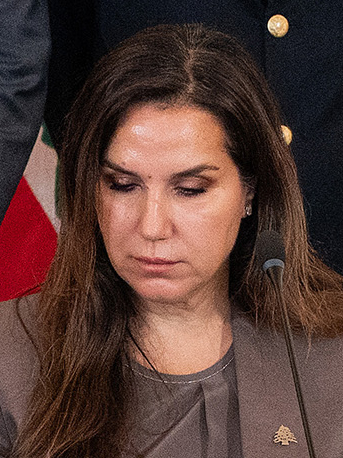
Nada Hamadeh Moawad in 2026

Nada Hamadeh Moawad (Arabic: نَدى حَمادة مُعوّض), is a Lebanese diplomat that since 2025 is serving as Ambassador of Lebanon to the United States.

== Career ==
Moawad started her career in international development and economic policy. She held several roles at the World Bank, where she did research and policy analysis on economic development, focusing on the Middle East and North Africa. She also worked as an advisor to the United Nations on issues of development strategies, governance, and economic reform. She also held a position in Lebanon private sector and leadership roles in the healthcare sector.

In 2025, she was appointed as Lebanon's Ambassador to the United States, representing Lebanon in bilateral relations with the United States.

== 2026 Israel–Lebanon talks ==
In April 2026, Moawad was part of the official Lebanese delegation to the rare diplomatic talks between Lebanon and Israel that took place in Washington, D.C. The talks were described as "constructive" at a time of regional tension between the two countries. Later that year, on 26 June, she signed a framework agreement between Israel and Lebanon in Washington, D.C., aimed at securing Israel's withdrawal from all parts of Lebanon in exchange for the Lebanese army's efforts to dismantle Hezbollah.

== Personal life ==
Nada Hamadeh Moawad was born to a Druze family in Baakline. She is married to Gerard Moawad.
