= Joseph Azar (singer) =

Lebanese artist

- Born: Joseph Salim Azar; 1942 (age 83–84); Jezzine, Lebanon
- Other names: Azar, Joseph Salim (English); جوزيف عازار (Arabic)
- Occupations: Actor, singer
- Years active: 1961–present
- Relatives: Carlos Azar (son)

Joseph Azar (Arabic: جوزيف عازار) (born 1942) is a Lebanese artist, solo singer, and performer in Lebanese musical comedies and theatre.

== Beginnings ==
Azar was born in the town of Jezzine, Lebanon to Lebanese parents. He was the youngest of four sons and attended elementary school in his hometown. Influenced by his father, he began singing at a young age; he had a strong traditional voice, which he developed in a church choir. At the end of 1958, Azar moved to Beirut and studied music at the Conservatoire Libanais.

== Career ==
Joseph Azar began his career in 1961 with the Rahbani Brothers and Fairuz in the play Al Baal-bakiye then performed in several other plays, including: Jisir El Amar (1962), Hollo (1963) and Bayaa El Khawatem. He appeared in the musical El Challal directed by Romeo Lahoud and composed by Walid Gholmieh. In the years 1965, 1966, and 1967, Azar played the main role in three consecutive works with Sabah and Nadia Jamal, Mawwal, Mijjana, and Attaba composed by Zaki Nassif, Walid Gholmieh, and Romeo Lahhoud.

He played the role of the Prince Badr in the play El Qalaa (1968) with Sabah. It was composed by Walid Gholmieh and directed by Romeo Lahoud. In 1971, Azar played the role of the Russian ambassador in the play Phoenicia 80. In the summer of the same year, he starred in the Byblos International Festival with the Anwar troupe (Ferkat al Anwar) in the play Ya Leil in conjunction with Duraid Lahham, Fadwa Obeid and Nadia Jamal. The poems were written by George Jerdaq, the music was composed by Walid Gholmieh, and the play was directed by Munir Mouasseri. In 1999, he collaborated with Caracalla dance group in the plays Laylat Qamar and Alf Layle w Layle performed at the Baalbeck International Festival. The play Alf Layle w Layle was played in 2002 at theatres including the Place des Arts in Montreal, Canada, Opera House in Frankfurt, Germany and the National Theatre in Beijing under the auspices of the Chinese Ministry of Culture.
