= Jeremy Hackett =

Fashion designer

- Born: 19 May 1953 (age 71); Bristol, England
- Occupation(s): Fashion designer, entrepreneur
- Known for: Co-founder of Hackett

Jeremy Hackett (born 19 May 1953) is a British fashion designer and business entrepreneur who co-founded the British menswear company Hackett alongside Ashley Lloyd-Jennings.

== Early life and career ==
Hackett was brought up and educated at Clifton College, Clifton, Bristol. Having left school at 17 he started full-time work in a local men’s fashion shop, moving to London at the age of 19. He worked in the King's Road before accepting a position as a salesman at a tailor's shop on Savile Row owned by menswear pioneer and supplier of clothing to rock stars and celebrities John Michael Ingram. As a sideline, Hackett bought and sold second hand clothes purchased from the London street markets and, through this, met up with Ashley Lloyd-Jennings, who shared similar tastes in fashion. They opened Hackett's first store on the King's Road in 1983. Hackett claims that he was at least partly responsible for starting the much-mocked red trousers trend in London, telling Esquire “We used to sell red trousers and lots of the Sloane types used to come in and buy them, and it just spread from there,” but insisted “I’d never wear them though.”

== Style guidance ==
The Hackett brand grew quickly and Jeremy Hackett has also become well known as an authority on men's fashion particularly in classic style. In 2007, his book Mr Classic – an anecdotal critique of men’s style – was released.

Hackett continues to offer style advice through the 'Ask Jeremy' portal on the Hackett website. He also contributes articles to publications such as Men's Health and Forbes.
