= Farid Abboud =

Lebanese diplomat (born 1951)

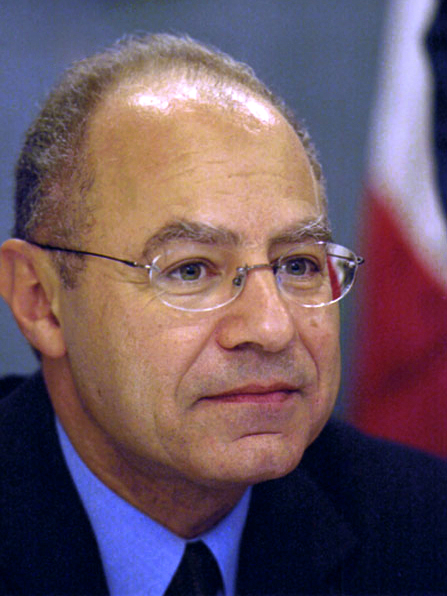
- Farid Aboud in 2002

Personal details
- Born: 1951 (age 74–75)
- Education: Université Saint-Joseph, Beirut; University of California, Los Angeles

Farid Abboud (Arabic: فريد عبود, born 1951) is a Lebanese diplomat who served as Lebanese Ambassador to China from June 2013 to December 2017. Before becoming ambassador to China, he was the ambassador to Tunisia from July 2007 to June 2013 and the ambassador to the United States from March 1999 until July 2007.

== Education ==
Abboud holds a Diploma of Higher Studies in Political Sciences from the Université Saint-Joseph in Beirut and a PhD in history from the University of California, Los Angeles.

== Career ==
Abboud began his diplomatic career in the Ministry of Foreign Affairs in Beirut in 1974. From 1973 to 1977, he was assistant professor of political science at the Université Saint-Joseph in Beirut. From 1990 to 1995, Farid was the Consul General in Los Angeles. Starting in 1995, he became the assistant director-general of the Department of Political Affairs in the Ministry of Foreign Affairs. He served also in the embassies of Moscow, London, and Rome.

Abboud has also served as a member of the Delegation of Lebanon to several international conferences. Among these are the Monitoring Group of the April 1996 Understanding in Southern Lebanon, the U.N. General Assembly Sessions of 1997, 1998 and 1999, and the Non-Aligned Movement Summit Meetings of 1996 and 1998. Abboud reappeared at the Los Angeles World Affairs Council to deliver speeches relating to Lebanon in his speech entitled: "Lebanon and the Peace Process: An Update“

== Criticism ==
In 2007, Abboud was described by the Washington Institute for Near East Policy as Syria's de facto second ambassador to the United States owing to Abboud's support for the Bashar al-Assad regime. According to former Department of Defense official David Schenker, "Abboud has spent the last six years of the Bush administration largely isolated, having little or no contact with executive branch personnel."
