= Karen Maron =

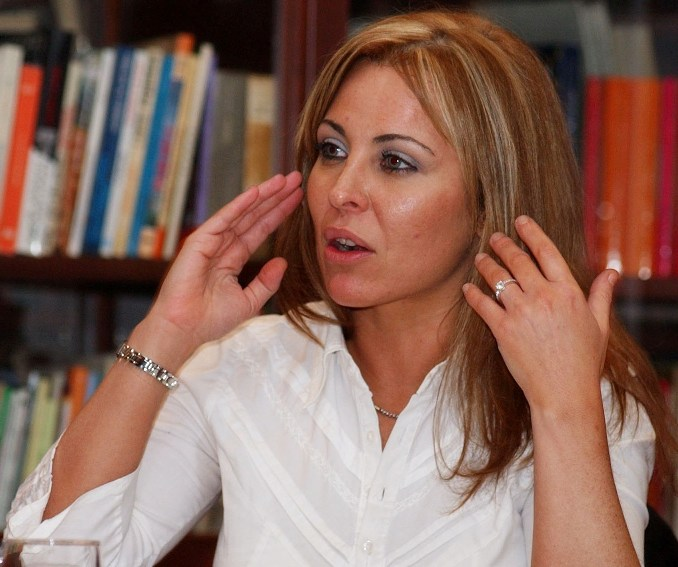
- Karen Marón in 2010

Karen Marón is an Argentine journalist who works in the Middle East. She is known for her coverage of the Israeli-Palestinian conflict, spanning from the Second Intifada to the ongoing Gaza war. She has also covered crises in Iraq, Syria, Lebanon, Colombia, and Libya. Marón reports on social, political, and economic issues.

She also covered Syria, Libya, and Egypt during the Arab Spring and its aftermath from February 2011 to 2017.

Due to her work writing about war victims, she is recognized as a member of honor by the World Peace Summit and the Dart Center for Journalism and Trauma, which is based at the University of Washington. The Dart Center for Journalism and Trauma is dedicated to promoting excellence in reporting violence and providing training to journalists on trauma-related issues in collaboration with the International Society for Traumatic Stress Studies.

== Early life ==
Marón's paternal grandparents were born in Lebanon, and came to Argentina after Ottoman persecution, while her maternal parents were born in Asturias and fled to Argentina during the Spanish Civil War. She recalls first learning about conflict and social issues from her mother, who was a social worker.

== Career ==
Marón focuses on reporting armed conflicts and international politics. She first reported from a conflict zone in the Middle East in 2000, when she was 20, and the Second Intifada has newly broken out. The following year she reported on the peace negotiations between FARC and the Colombian government.

She worked as a freelance correspondent from Iraq for various renowned media outlets from 2004 to 2024. These include NBC-Telemundo (United States), BBC World (United Kingdom), Radio France International, El Universal (Mexico), El Tiempo, El Espectador, Caracol Radio (Colombia), Folha de S.Paulo (Brazil), El Mercurio (Chile), Perfil weekly magazine, and Télam of Argentina. In addition, she has made contributions to Radio Cooperativa (Chile), Espectador Radio (Uruguay), and Azteca Television (Mexico).

She has also covered the ongoing 2026 Iran war.

Marón was featured in the war documentary, A Good Day to Die, Hoka Hey, as herself.
