= Ebel as-Saqi =

Ebel as-Saqi إبل السقي
- Municipality
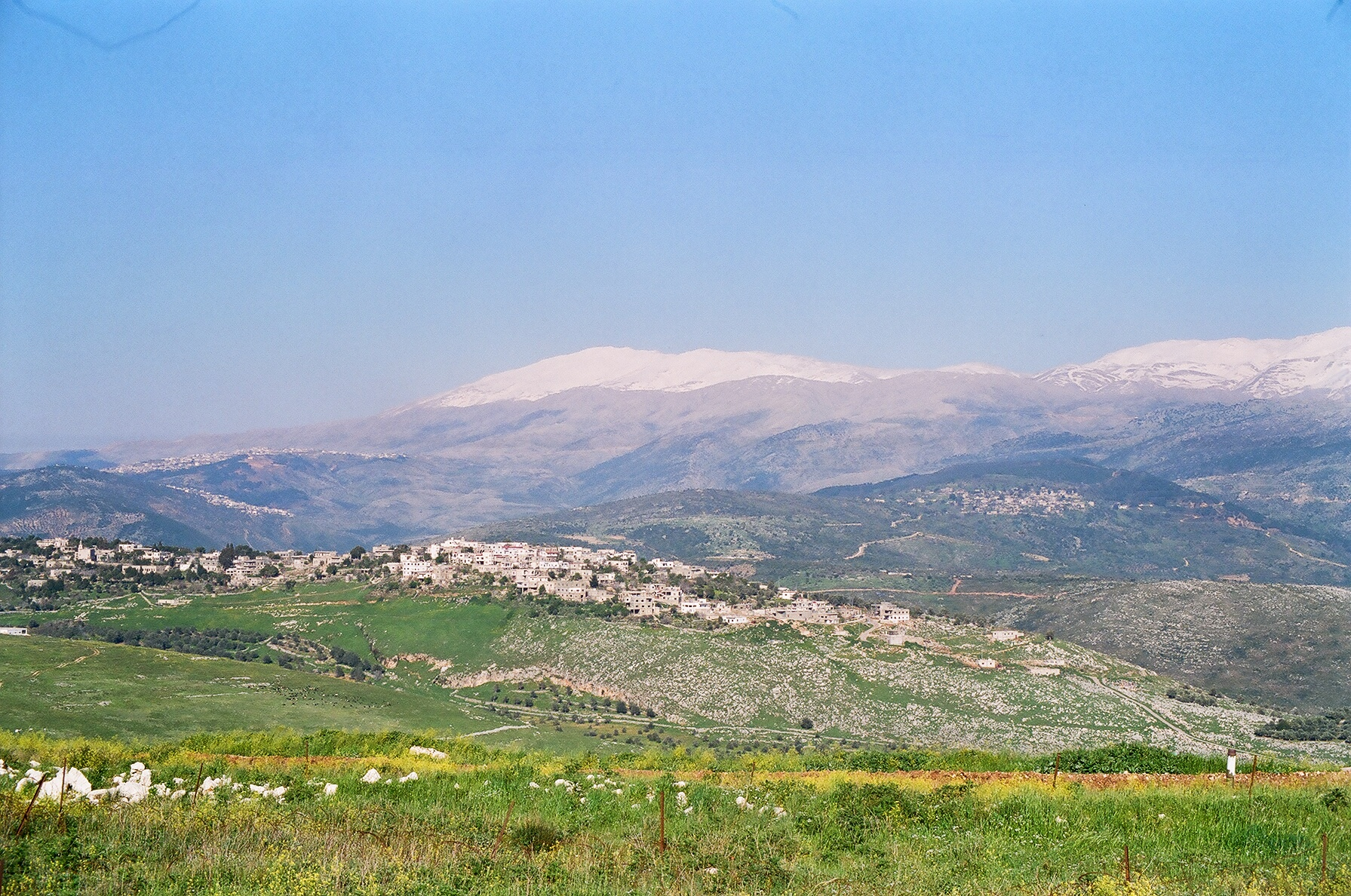
- Ebel as-Saqi in 1997

- Location within Lebanon
- Coordinates: 33°21′26.18″N 35°37′39.17″E
- Grid position: 139/157 L
- Country: Lebanon
- Governorate: Nabatieh Governorate
- District: Marjayoun District
- Elevation: 670 m (2,200 ft)
- Time zone: UTC+2 (EET)
  - Summer (DST): UTC+3 (EEST)
- Dialing code: +961

Ebel as-Saqi (إبل السقي) is a municipality in the Marjayoun District in southern Lebanon.

== History ==
In 1875, Victor Guérin found it to be a "considerable" village, with about 1000 inhabitants. 700 were "Schismatic Greek" and the rest were apparently Druze. At the north-west of the village there was an abundant stream.

Following the establishment of UNIFIL Ibl as-Saqi was in the eastern most sector in which the UN had soldiers with the Norwegian Army establishing their base near the village. In 1999 they were replaced by an Indian battalion from the 4th Gurkha Rifles. On 2 March 1999 the IDF South Lebanon coordinator, Brigadier General Erez Gerstein was killed by a roadside bomb on the road between Ibl as-Saqi and Kaukaba. The two soldiers and a reporter he was travelling with were also killed.

In June 1999, as the South Lebanon Army (SLA) withdrew from Jezzine, retreating SLA members and their families commandeered empty houses in Ebel as-Saqi, Kawkaba and Marjayoun. At the time it was estimated that the SLA had only four hundred men.

== Demographics ==
In 2014 Christians made up 61.03% and Druze made up 37.92% of registered voters in Ebel as-Saqi. 38.29% of the voters were Greek Orthodox.

== Sister cities ==
- Kongsvinger, Norway

== Bibliography ==
- Guérin, V. (1880). Description Géographique Historique et Archéologique de la Palestine (in French). Vol. 3: Galilee, pt. 2. Paris: L'Imprimerie Nationale.
