= Azmi Mikati =

Lebanese businessman (born 1972)

Azmi T. Mikati
- Born: Azmi Taha Mikati; 21 September 1972 (age 52); Tripoli, Lebanon
- Education: Columbia University
- Title: CEO, M1 Group
- Father: Taha Mikati
- Relatives: Najib Mikati (uncle)

Azmi T. Mikati (born 21 September 1972) is a Lebanese businessman. He is the CEO of M1 Group, a company founded by his father and uncle.

== Early life ==
He is the son of Taha Mikati and nephew of the former Prime Minister of Lebanon, Najib Mikati. Mikati studied at Columbia University, New York, graduating in 1994 with a Bachelor of Sciences from the Fu Foundation School of Engineering and Applied Science.

== Career ==
Mikati founded T-One, a US-based telecommunications company specialising in international services in 1994, whilst studying engineering at Columbia University. T-One was sold to a publicly traded US company in 1997. In 1998, he was appointed CEO of emerging market mobile phone company, Investcom.

Investcom, founded in 1982, was a Middle Eastern mobile telecommunications network provider. Under Mikati's leadership, the company's sales grew from $30 million to close to $1 billion. In 2005, Investcom was added to the Dubai International Financial Exchange and the London Stock Exchange (LSE) in what was known to be the largest listing of a Middle Eastern company on the LSE, making Mikati the youngest CEO of a publicly traded Middle Eastern company at the time. The following year, Investcom was bought by the leading African mobile operator MTN for $5.5 billion. Mikati was appointed Non-Executive Director of the MTN Group in July 2006.

Azmi Mikati is CEO of the M1 Group, a family investment holding company that was founded by Azmi's father Taha and uncle Najib Mikati. In addition to holding a 10% stake in the South Africa-based telecommunications company MTN, M1 Group is invested in various sectors and geographies such as real estate, aviation, cement, fashion, retail, energy and banking.
