= Taha Mikati =

Lebanese billionaire (born 1944/45)

- Born: 1944 or 1945 (age 80–81)
- Citizenship: Lebanon; Cyprus
- Education: American University of Beirut, Lebanon
- Occupations: Co-founder, Investcom; Founder and chairman, M1 Group
- Children: 3, including Azmi Mikati
- Relatives: Najib Mikati (brother)

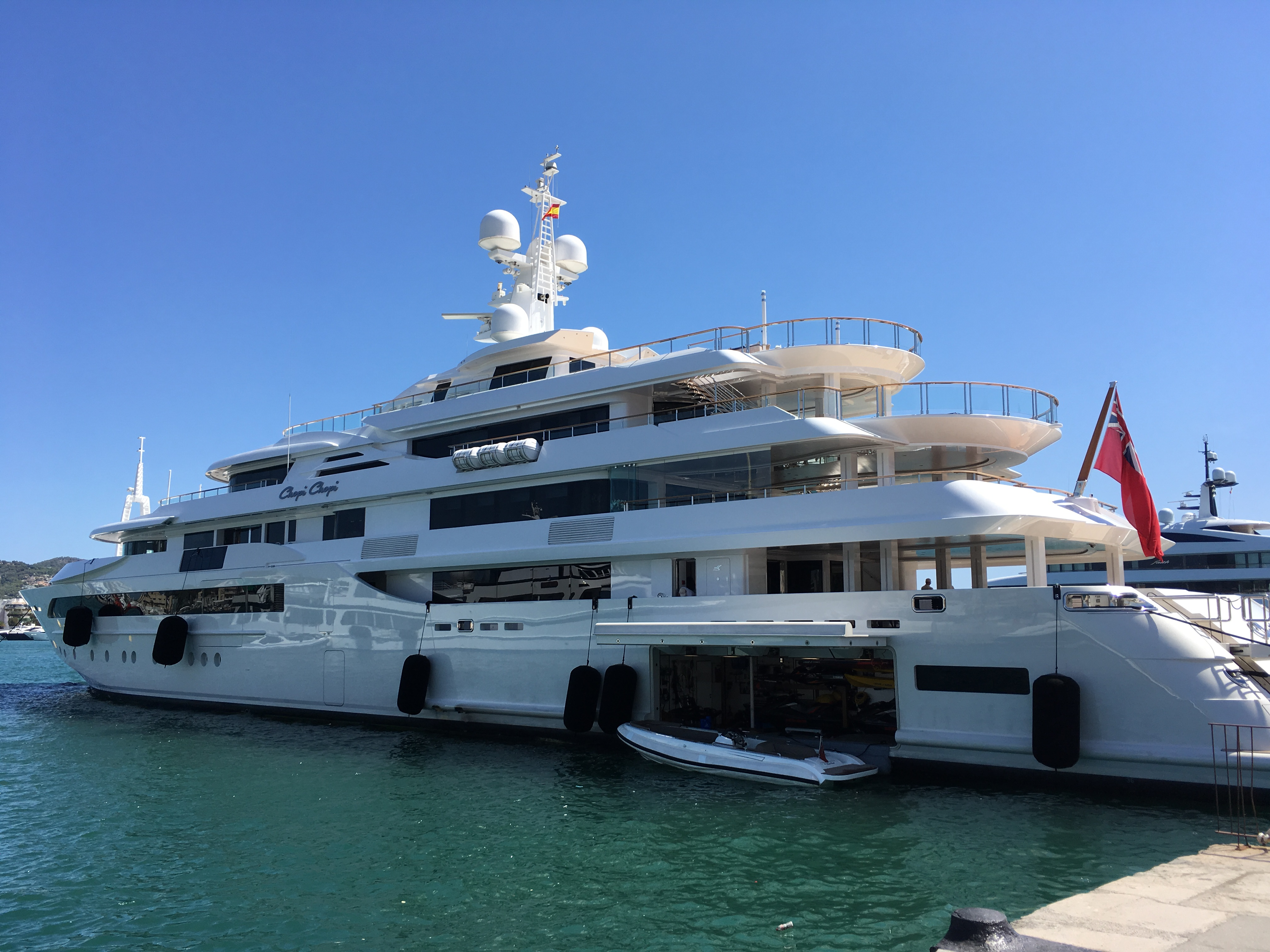
His yacht, "Chopi Chopi", August 2017, Ibiza

Taha Mikati (Arabic: طه ميقاتي; born in 1944) is a Lebanese billionaire businessman, the brother of fellow billionaire and former prime minister of Lebanon Najib Mikati. He is the co-founder of Investcom, the M1 Group, and the Mikati Foundation.

== Education ==
He earned a bachelor's degree from the American University of Beirut, Lebanon.

== Career ==
In 1979, he founded Arabian Construction Company (ACC). Headquartered in Abu Dhabi, the ACC is one of the largest construction companies in the Middle East. Together with his brother Najib, Taha Mikati founded the Lebanese telecom operator Investcom in the 1980s.

In 2025, Forbes Middle East estimated his fortune at $2.8 billion.

== Personal life ==
He is married, with three children, and lives in Beirut, Lebanon. His son, Azmi Mikati, is the CEO of M1 Group. In July 2018 he purchased Cypriot citizenship.
