= Gabriel Issa =

Lebanese politician and diplomat

Gabriel Naoum Issa (born 15 March 1957) is a Lebanese-American businessman, politician and diplomat previously serving as Lebanon ambassador to the United States.

== Early life and education ==
Issa was born in Lebanon and he is a Maronite Christian. In 1975, Issa immigrated to the United States at the age of 18 and settled in Detroit among large Lebanese-American community. He was educated at the Detroit Institute of Technology where he obtained a bachelor of science degree in Civil Engineering in 1980.

== Career ==
While still studying Civil Engineering, Issa established two businesses, AAA Language Services and Interotext Translation Services based in Bloomfield in March 1978. The company translated General Motors car manual from English to other foreign languages. He later founded other businesses including AAA International Group incorporated in May 1997, and Joules International registered in January 2009. While conducting his businesses in the US, Issa was actively involved in Lebanese politics supporting Free Patriotic Movement, (FPM) party which is one of the two large Christian parties in Lebanon.

Issa returned to Lebanon in 2016 after 40 years in the US ahead of the 2016 presidential election to support his long term associate Michel Aoun who went on to win the presidential election. Issa was appointed Lebanon ambassador to the US by president Michel Aoun in July 2017 and presented his letter of credence to the US president Donald Trump in the Oval Office in January 2018 succeeding Antoine Chedid who served from 2007 to 2016.
