= Hackett London =

British clothing retailer

- Type: Private
- Industry: Clothing
- Founded: London, England (1983)
- Founder: Jeremy Hackett; Ashley Lloyd-Jennings
- Headquarters: London, England
- Products: Men's wear and accessories; Boys' clothing
- Services: Barbering; Shoe shining; Tailoring
- Owner: AWWG
- Website: hackett.com

Hackett London is a British menswear brand and multi-channel retailer founded in 1983 by Jeremy Hackett and Ashley Lloyd-Jennings. Headquartered in London with its flagship store at 14 Savile Row, the company operates over 160 stores globally. The brand is owned by AWWG (formerly the Pepe Jeans Group).

== History ==
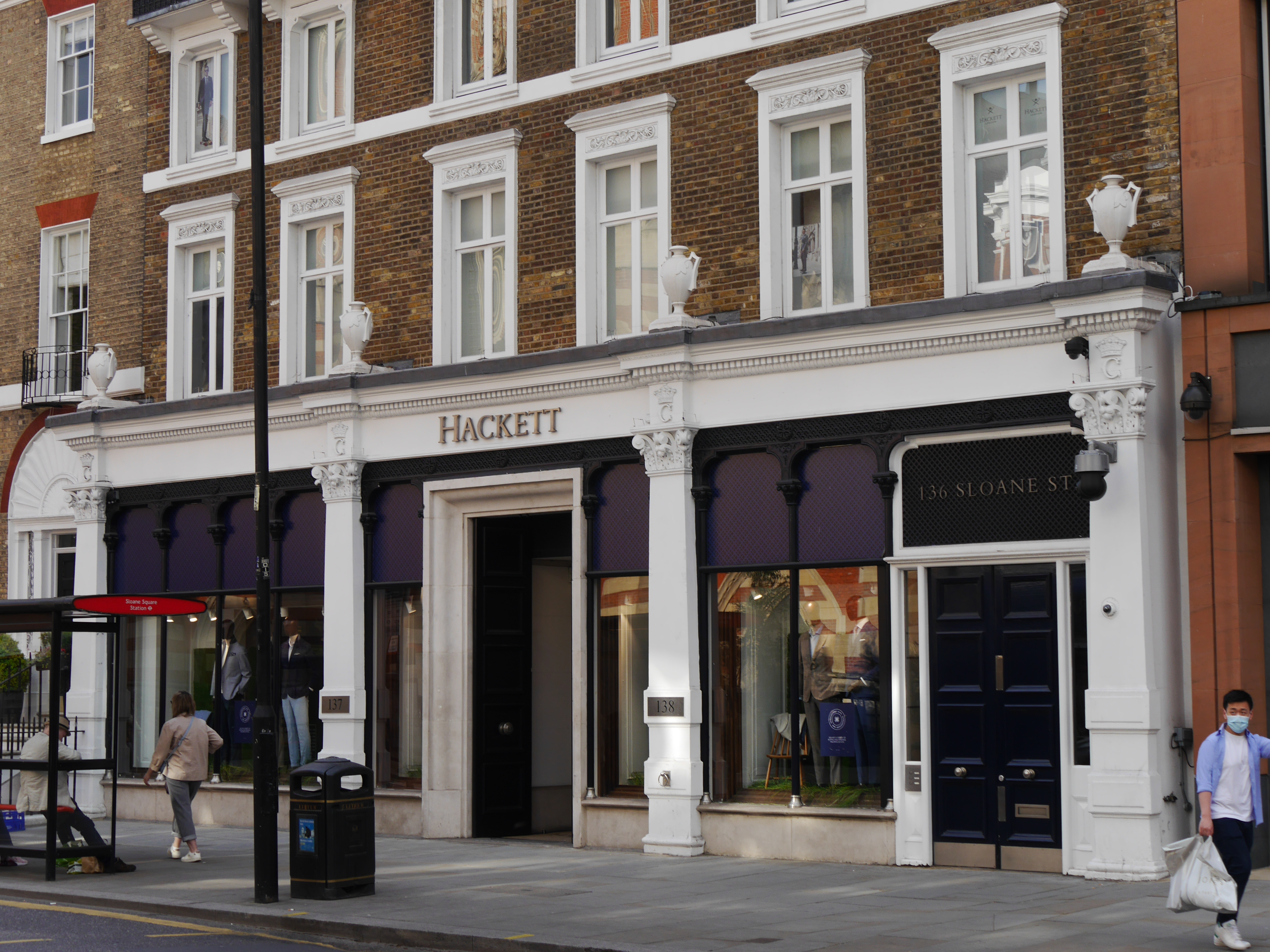
Hackett, Sloane Street, London, 2022

Hackett was founded in 1983 by Jeremy Hackett and Ashley Lloyd-Jennings from a stall on London's Portobello Road. The first shop, on the "wrong end" of King's Road, in London's Chelsea district, was selling only used clothes.

The company gradually expanded over several years, increasing the number of branches and moving from acquiring and selling second-hand clothing to designing and selling its own items. International expansion began with the 1989 opening of a Spanish branch in Madrid. In 1994, Hackett opened a shop on the Rive Gauche in Paris before adding children’s clothes to its collection a year later.

In June 2005, Richemont sold Hackett to the Spanish investment company Torreal S.C.R., S.A. Hackett appointed American creative director Michael Sondag, who joined Hackett from Tommy Hilfiger in 2005.

In February 2015, Hackett (part of the Pepe Jeans Group) was bought by Lebanese firm M1 Group and by LVMH subsidiary L Capital Asia. Hackett and Pepe Jeans were previously owned by Torreal Funds (31 percent), Artá Capital (16.4 percent), L Capital Europe (11.5 percent) and its managers. Hackett became the official clothing supplier to the Williams Martini Racing team, from the 2015 season onwards.

The company's flagship store at 14 Savile Row in London was previously a Hardy Amies shop from 1946 until March 2019; the space was taken over by Hackett in June 2019.
