= Simon Karam =

Lebanese lawyer (born 1950)

Ambassador of Lebanon to the United States of America
- In office September 1992 – August 1993

Personal details
- Born: Simon Massoud Karam; 2 February 1950 (age 76) Jezzine, Lebanon
- Children: 3
- Education: Saint Joseph University

Simon Karam (born 2 February 1950) is a Lebanese lawyer who served as the ambassador of Lebanon to the United States of America between 1992 and 1993.

== Early life and education ==
Karam was born in Jezzine on 2 February 1950. He hails from a Maronite family. His parents are Massoud Karam who was a merchant and Victoria Aziz. He received a degree in law from Saint Joseph University in Beirut.

== Career ==
Following his graduation Karam worked as a lawyer. He was appointed mohafez (governor) of Bekaa in 1990 and mohafez of Beirut city in 1991. He was named as the ambassador of Lebanon to the United States of America in 1992 and presented his credentials to President George Bush on 8 September. Karam resigned from office in August 1993. Then he continued to work as a lawyer in Lebanon.

=== Alliances and views ===
Karam was part of the Qornet Shehwan movement and was one of the political figures, including Samir Frangieh and Walid Jumblatt, who supported the implementation of the Taif accords and the withdrawal of Syrian troops from Lebanon. Karam left the Qornet Shehwan movement in May 2005 before the elections. He was close to the Lebanese journalist and politician Gebran Tueni who was assassinated in December 2005. Following the assassination Karam argued that the incident was a catastrophe and was carried out by the Syrian forces led by the Syrian President Bashar al-Assad. Both Tueni and Karam stated in 2000 that Syria did not consider Lebanon as a sovereign country, but as a satellite country under its domination due to the fact that Lebanon could not take part in the negotiations with Israel.

Karam was among the signatories of the Statement of Solidarity which was issued at the beginning of the Syrian civil war in April 2011. The statement expressed the solidarity of the Lebanese intellectuals with Syrians in their struggle against Bashar al-Assad. In April 2026 he was chosen to lead the peace talks with Israel.

== Personal life ==
Karam married Alice Mogabgab in 1997, and they had three children, two daughters and a son.
