= Najib Mikati =

Prime Minister of Lebanon (born 1955)

- نجيب ميقاتي
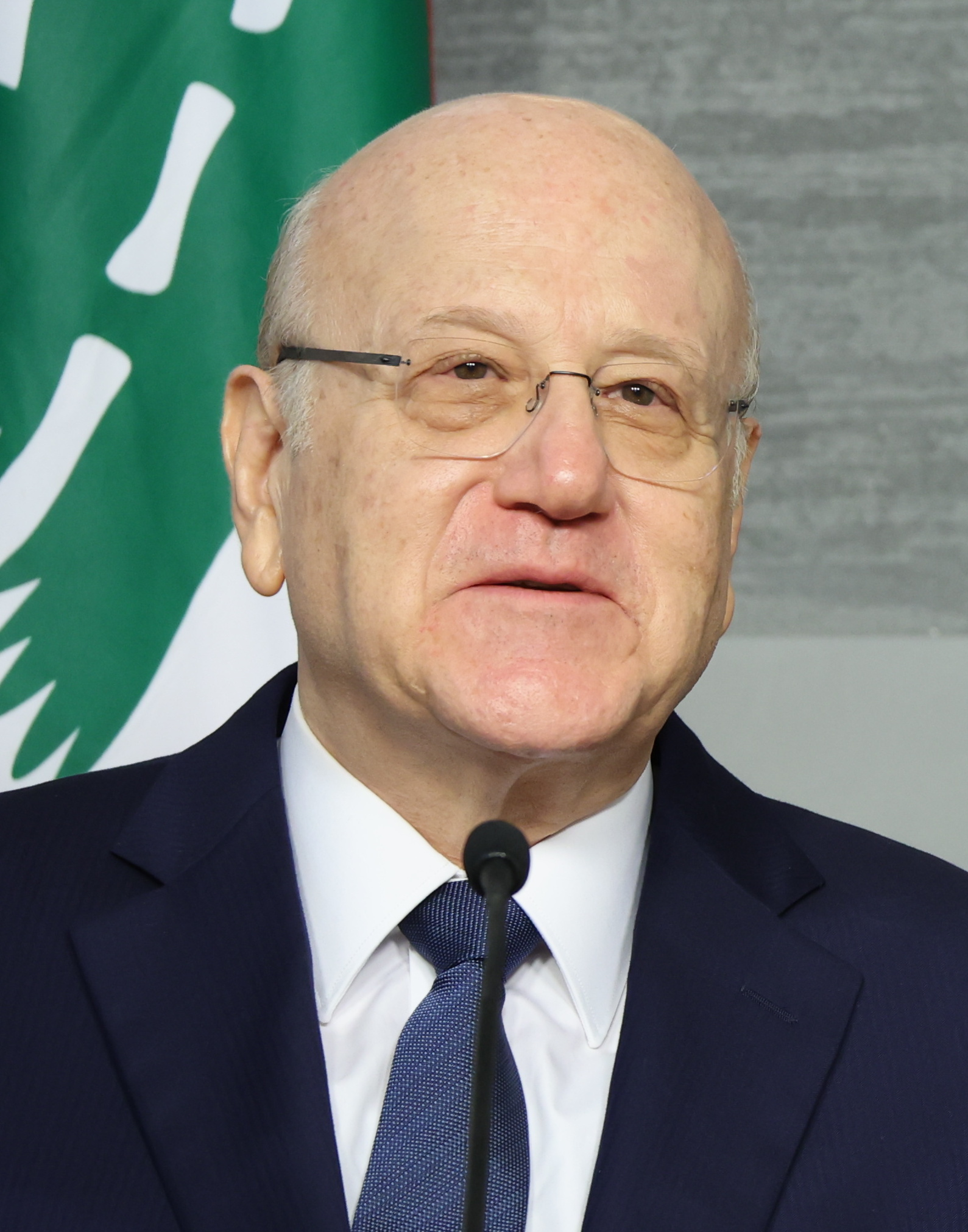
- Mikati in 2024

45th, 48th & 52nd Prime Minister of Lebanon
- In office 10 September 2021 – 8 February 2025
- President: Michel Aoun; Joseph Aoun
- Deputy: Saadeh Al Shami
- Preceded by: Hassan Diab
- Succeeded by: Nawaf Salam
- In office 13 June 2011 – 15 February 2014
- President: Michel Suleiman
- Deputy: Samir Mouqbel
- Preceded by: Saad Hariri
- Succeeded by: Tammam Salam
- In office 19 April 2005 – 19 July 2005
- President: Émile Lahoud
- Deputy: Elias Murr
- Preceded by: Omar Karami
- Succeeded by: Fouad Siniora

Member of the Lebanese Parliament
- In office 20 June 2009 – 15 May 2018
- Constituency: Tripoli District
- In office 17 October 2000 – May 2005
- Constituency: Tripoli District

Minister of Public Works and Transport
- In office 6 December 1998 – 26 October 2004
- Prime Minister: Salim Al-Huss; Rafic Hariri
- Preceded by: Ali Hrajli
- Succeeded by: Yassine Jaber

Personal details
- Born: 24 November 1955 (age 70) Tripoli, Lebanon
- Party: Azm Movement
- Other political affiliations: Independent
- Spouse: May Mikati
- Children: 3
- Relatives: Taha Mikati (brother); Azmi Mikati (nephew)
- Education: American University of Beirut; INSEAD
- Website: www.najib-mikati.net

Najib Azmi Mikati (Note: Arabic: نجيب عزمي ميقاتي, romanized: Najīb ʿAzmī Mīqātī) (born 24 November 1955) is a Lebanese politician and businessman who served as the 52nd prime minister of Lebanon from 2021 to 2025. He also served in this post as the 48th and 45th prime minister from 2011 to 2014 and in 2005, after holding the post of Minister of Public Works and Transport from December 1998 to 2003.

In 2005, he headed an interim government that supervised the 2005 general election following the withdrawal of Syrian troops. In 2011, he formed his second government, backed by the March 8 alliance, before he resigned in 2013. He was a member of parliament for Tripoli from 2000 to 2005 and was re-elected in 2009 and 2018. In July 2021, he was designated as prime minister and assumed office on 10 September 2021. He went on to lose the parliamentary consultations on 13 January 2025 against ICJ president Nawaf Salam, receiving only 9 votes to Salam's 84.

According to Forbes, Najib Mikati is the richest man in Lebanon along with his brother Taha Mikati, with each having a net worth of $2.8 billion in 2023. In 2019, state prosecutor Ghada Aoun accused Mikati of corruption and pressed charges of illegitimate enrichment via subsidised housing loans against him. The charges were dismissed on 3 February 2022 by judge Charbel Bou Samra. In 2023, an investigation in Monaco cleared him of any wrongdoing due to "insufficient evidence," and he has said that the accusations against him were politically motivated. During his tenure as Minister of Public Works and Transport (1998–2004), Mikati developed a working relationship with Syrian president Bashar al-Assad, a period in which Syria exercised significant political influence in Lebanon. He later distanced himself from the Assad government, resigning as prime minister in March 2013 amid tensions between the pro- and anti-Assad camps in Lebanon. Mikati and his brother Taha founded Investcom in 1982, building their fortune through mobile telecommunications operations in emerging markets across Africa and the Middle East. By 2005, the company had operations in ten countries — Ghana, Benin, Liberia, Guinea, Guinea-Bissau, Sudan, Syria, Yemen, Afghanistan and Cyprus — and was listed on the London and Dubai stock exchanges. In 2006, Investcom was acquired by South Africa's MTN Group for US$5.5 billion. The brothers subsequently founded M1 Group, a holding company with investments across telecommunications, real estate, fashion, energy and finance.

== Early life and education ==
Mikati was born on 24 November 1955 and hails from a prominent Sunni Muslim family based in Tripoli. He graduated from the American University of Beirut in 1980 with a Master of Business Administration (MBA) degree. He also attended a summer school program held at Harvard, and advanced management programs at INSEAD.

== Business career and wealth ==
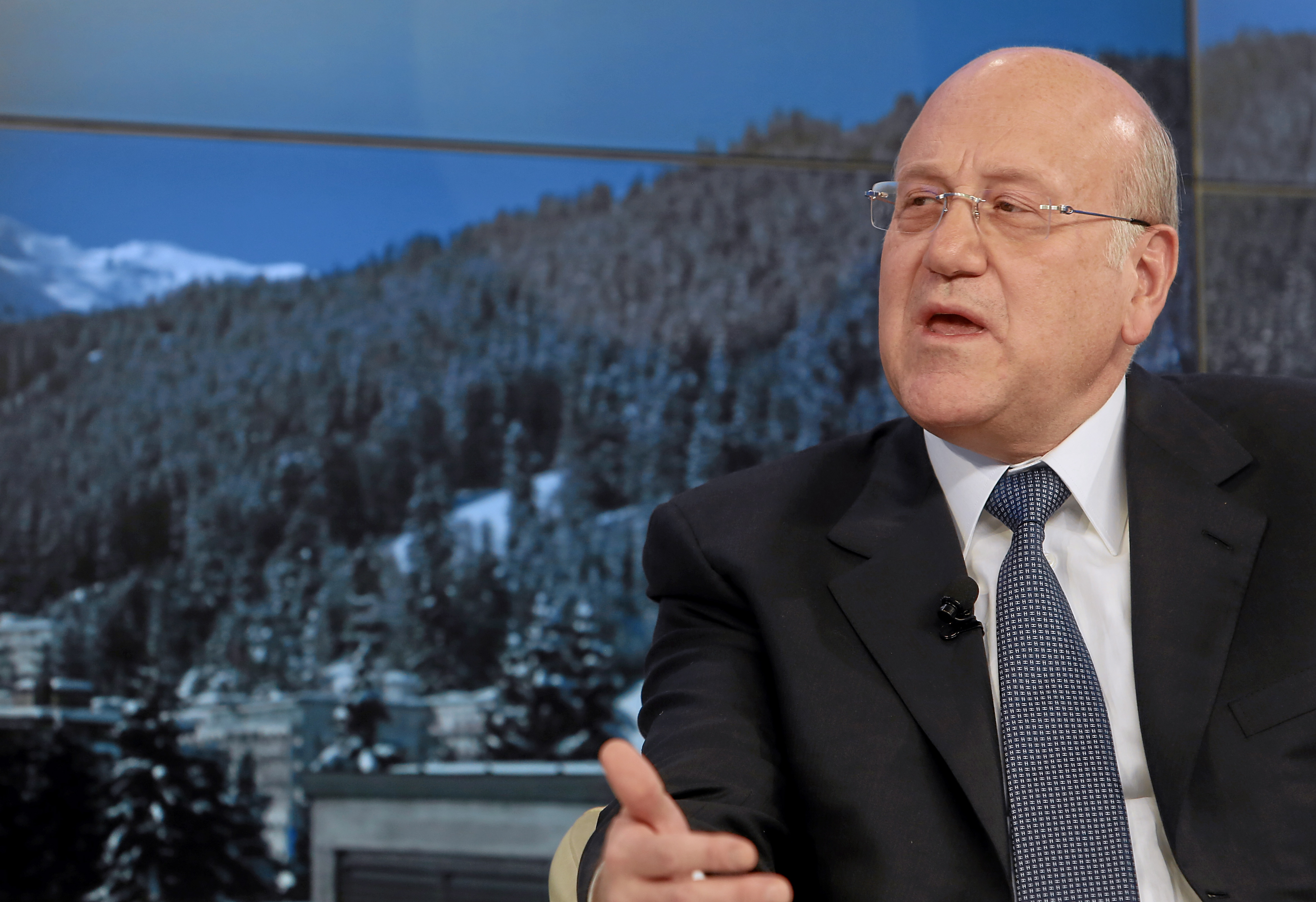
Mikati at the World Economic Forum, 2013

In 1979, Najib's older brother Taha Mikati founded Arabian Construction Company (ACC), headquartered in Abu Dhabi, which became one of the largest construction companies in the Middle East. Najib Mikati co-founded the telecommunications company Investcom with his brother Taha in 1982. He sold the company in June 2006 to South Africa's MTN Group for $5.5 billion. Through Investcom Holding the brothers together own the news website Lebanon24 and 11% of the shares in LBCI.

He is a major shareholder in the South African telecommunications operator MTN, owner of the high-end fashion brand Façonnable, and an investor in transport, gas, and oil businesses. He also has investments in real estate, notably in London, New York, and Monaco.

He owns the 79-metre (259 ft) motor yacht Mimtee.

== Political career ==
After being appointed Minister of Public Works and Transport on 4 December 1998, Mikati was elected to the Lebanese parliament from his hometown of Tripoli in 2000, outpolling Omar Karami, who was elected from the same multimember constituency. As a parliamentarian, Mikati retained his cabinet position and developed a reputation as a moderately pro-Syrian politician with a normal relationship with Syrian president Bashar al-Assad. Later Mikati was made transportation minister and became an ally of then Lebanese president Émile Lahoud, supporting the extension of his term in 2004.

He is considered a compromise figure, not being close to any particular political bloc. He is one of the leaders of the Sunni community. He himself denies any closeness to Hezbollah and describes himself as a liberal, emphasizing his background in business to reassure the United States.

=== First premiership ===
Mikati was a perennial candidate for Lebanon's prime ministry since 2000, finally taking the office upon the resignation of Omar Karami on 13 April 2005. During negotiations to form a government, Mikati emerged as a consensus candidate. Mikati acted as a caretaker premier. He is the leader of the solidarity bloc, which has had two seats in the Lebanese parliament since 2004. He also created the centrist movement and ideology in Lebanon and the Arab world, for which he has held many international conferences in Lebanon. In the general election of 2009, Mikati won again a seat from Tripoli, being a member of the centrist groups in the Lebanese parliament.

=== Second premiership ===
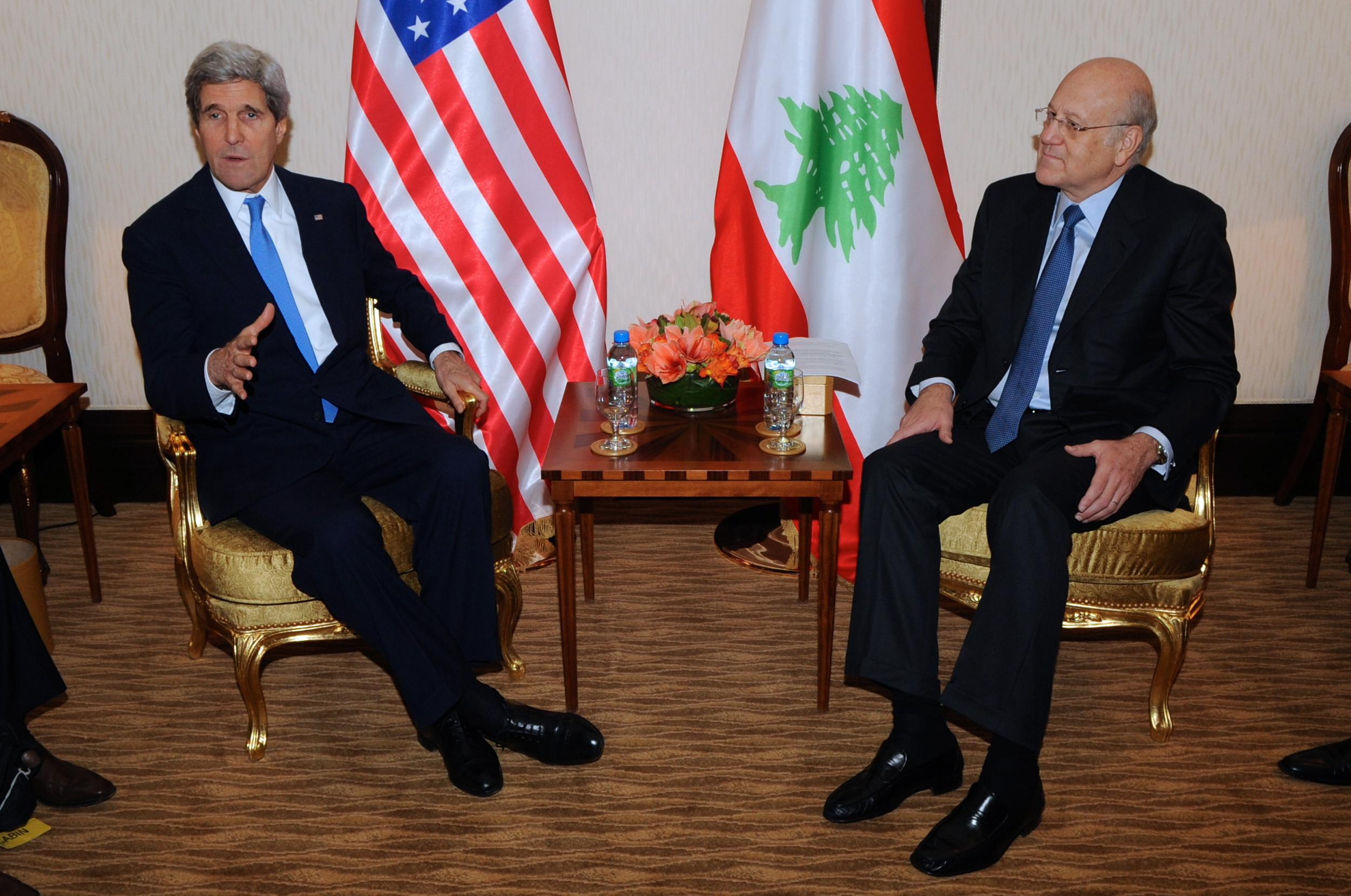
Mikati's meetings with U.S. Secretary of State John Kerry in 2014.

On 24 January 2011, the March 8 alliance, specifically Hezbollah, Michel Aoun, and Walid Jumblatt, nominated Mikati to become prime minister. Mikati succeeded Saad Hariri, whose government was brought down by the resignation of ten of the alliance's ministers and one presidential appointee on 12 January 2011, resulting from the collapse of the Saudi-Syrian initiative to reach a compromise on the Special Tribunal for Lebanon. On 25 January, 68 members of the parliament of Lebanon voted in favor of nominating Mikati for Prime Minister. President of Lebanon Michel Suleiman then invited Mikati to head a new Lebanese government. The process of government formation lasted for five months due to serious disagreements between leaders. On 13 June 2011, Mikati became the Prime Minister of Lebanon for the second time.

On 13 June, Mikati announced the formation of the government and stated that it would begin by "liberating land that remains under the occupation of the Israeli enemy". On 22 March 2013, Mikati resigned from office, due to "intensifying pressure between the pro-Assad and anti-Assad camps" and the Lebanese president accepted his resignation on 23 March 2013. On 6 April 2013, Tammam Salam was tasked to form a new government.

=== Third premiership ===
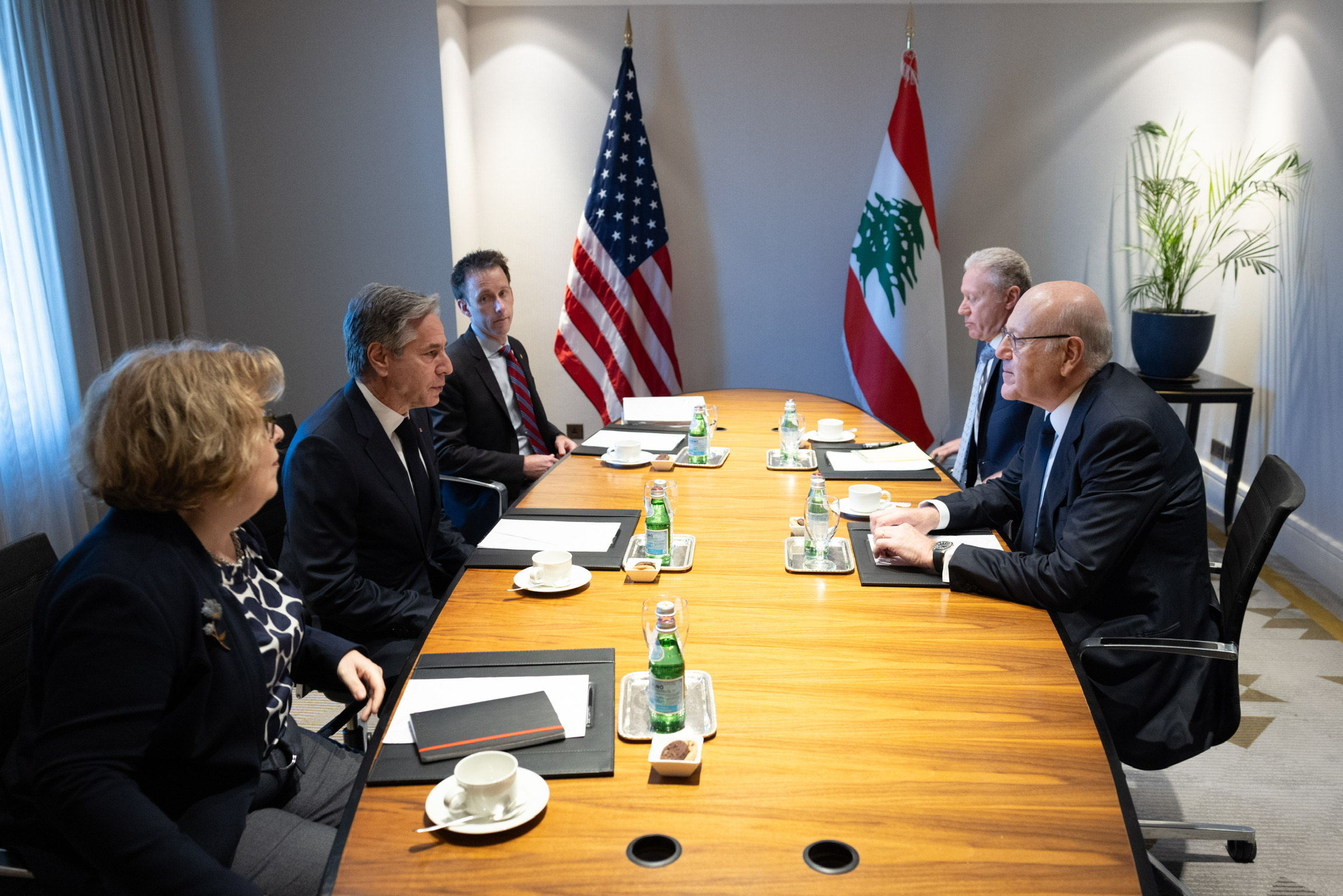
Mikati with US Secretary of State Antony Blinken, 4 November 2023

Following the resignation of Prime Minister Hassan Diab in August 2020, both Mustafa Adib and Saad Hariri failed to form a government. Mikati was designated to fill the role on 26 July 2021. He received 72 votes out of 128 MPs. Mikati declared that he wanted a purely technocratic government, without representatives of political parties, in order to carry out the economic reforms expected by Lebanon's donors. His appointment was received coldly by the population. As the country sank into a serious economic, social and humanitarian crisis, he was seen as a representative of the traditional political class and economic elites. According to the daily L'Orient-Le Jour, “if being a billionaire has long been an asset in establishing someone on the Lebanese political scene, it is now perceived by part of the population as a symbol of the plundering of public resources by the political class. On 10 September 2021, Mikati was able to form a government of 24 members after long negotiations with President Aoun, and the various political parties. When he took office, Lebanon was in the grip of a very serious economic crisis: collapse of the national currency, galloping inflation (the cost of food had jumped by 700% in the previous two years), massive layoffs, a poverty rate of 78% according to the UN, frequent power cuts, fuel shortages, etc. He announced that he wanted to call on the solidarity of the Arab world to try to get the country out of the crisis it was going through and to negotiate with the IMF.

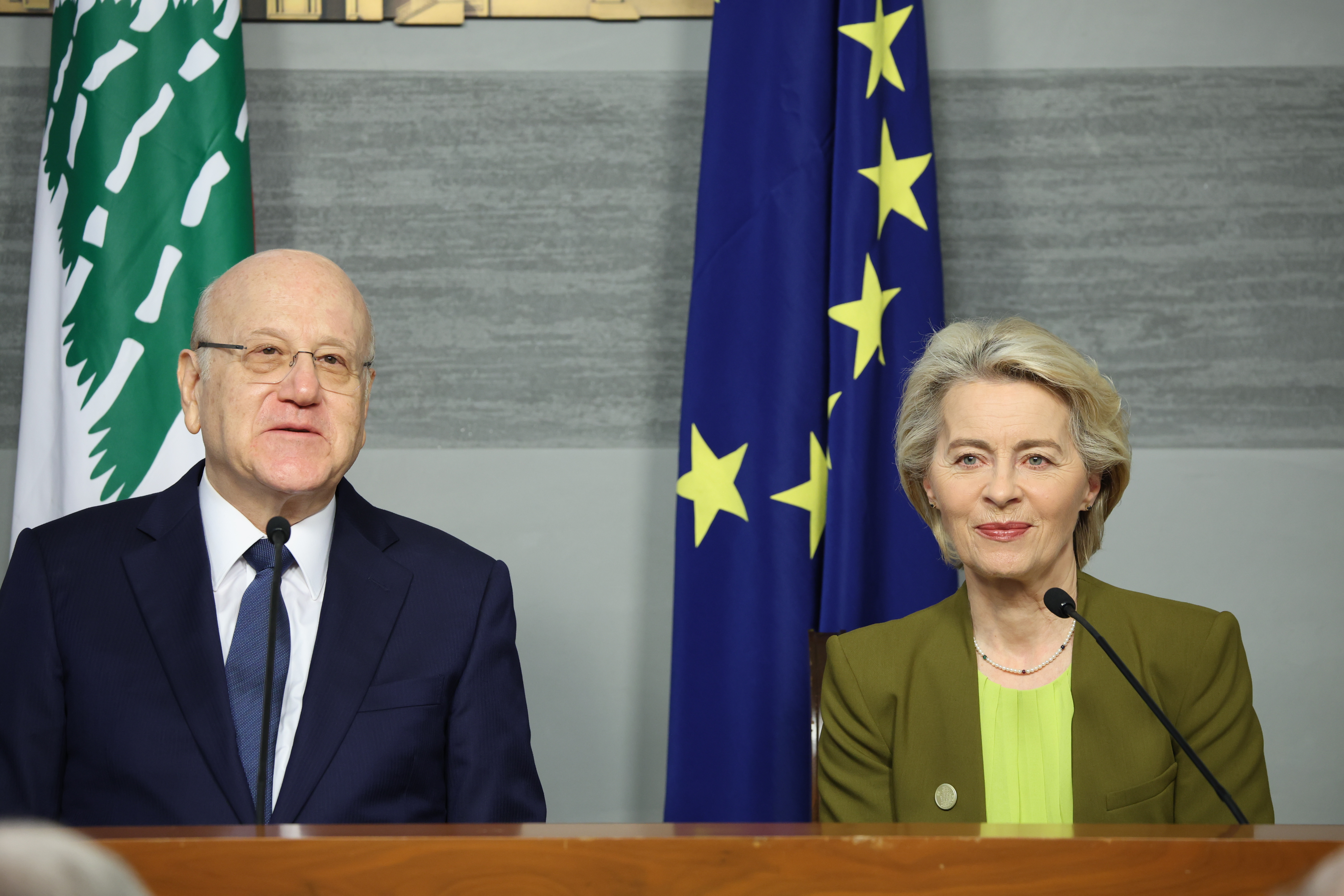
Mikati with President of the European Commission Ursula von der Leyen, 2 May 2024

In February 2022, Patriarch Bechara Boutros Al-Rai, Lebanese senior Christian cleric and head of the Maronite Church, called on the Mikati government to "agree with the IMF on a plan that saves Lebanon from collapse".

He was again named prime minister designate on 23 June 2022 with 54 votes against Nawaf Salam's 28 to form a new cabinet until the remainder of President Michel Aoun's term. However, Mikati and Aoun failed to agree on a new government numerous times. President Michel Aoun signed the government's resignation decree, a day before his six-year term officially ended, and Najib Mikati's government remained in office in a caretaker capacity, however Aoun's move was deemed as of no effect by the Lebanese Parliament in a session held on 3 November since the government was already considered resigned following parliamentary elections on 15 May.

On 6 November 2023, in response to the killing of four civilians in southern Lebanon, Mikati announced that his government would submit an urgent complaint to the UN Security Council against Israel saying that its "targeting of civilians in its aggression against Lebanon" was a "heinous crime". In July 2024, he called for a ceasefire in the Gaza war and accused Israel of committing genocide against Palestinians in the Gaza Strip.

Mikati blamed Israel for the 2024 Lebanon pager explosions, saying that they represented a "serious violation of Lebanese sovereignty and a crime by all standards".

Following a series of Israeli strikes on southern Lebanon on 23 September 2024 which killed 492 and injured 1,645, Mikati called the airstrikes a "war of extermination" and accused Israel of "a destructive plan" that aims to destroy Lebanese villages and towns.

On January 11, 2025, Mikati visited Syria and met with Syria's de facto leader Ahmed al-Sharaa, it was the first time in 15 years that a Lebanese Prime Minister visited Damascus.

On January 13, 2025, Mikati announced his resignation as Nawaf Salam was elected by 84 lawmakers.

On February 4, 2025, Mikati welcomed Qatari Prime Minister and Foreign Minister Sheikh Mohammed bin Abdulrahman Al Thani to Beirut. The visit was part of a series of high-level diplomatic engagements following the recent election of President Joseph Aoun in Lebanon. The discussions touched upon Qatar's potential involvement in Lebanon's reconstruction efforts, particularly in the southern region affected by the recent conflict with Israel.

== Controversy ==
=== Corruption cases ===
In 2019, state prosecutor Ghada Aoun pressed charges against Mikati over illegitimate enrichment via subsidised housing loans. The charges were dismissed on 3 February 2022 by judge Charbel Bou Samra.

In October 2021, Mikati was named in the Pandora Papers leak. He denied any wrongdoing.

According to press reports, France's National Financial Prosecutor's Office opened a preliminary investigation in September 2025 following complaints filed by the anti-corruption NGO Sherpa and the Collective of Victims of Fraudulent and Criminal Practices in Lebanon, said to concern, among other things, real estate and movable assets in France and abroad. The Mikati family stated that they had received no notification from the French judicial authorities and only became aware of the reported complaint and alleged opening of an investigation through the press, describing the origin of the family's wealth as "ethical, legal, and transparent" and expressing confidence in the French judiciary while invoking the presumption of innocence.

=== Wikileaks revelations ===
A cable from the US Embassy in Beirut dated 19 December 2008 and published by Wikileaks reveals that Mikati, in a meeting with then Assistant Secretary of State David Hale on 18 December 2008, referred to Hezbollah as a "tumor" that "must be removed in order to preserve Lebanon," and added that "he was expecting Hezbollah to bring Lebanon to a sad ending." The author of the cable, Michele J. Sison, then US Ambassador to Lebanon, noted in the cable that Mikati repeated the tumor qualification for Hezbollah several times during the meeting, which in Mikati's view, "whether benign or malignant, must be removed". Sison ended that cable by a comment acknowledging that Mikati was "presenting himself for our benefit as a foe of Hizballah, as he is looking forward to potential opportunities to return to the Prime Ministry."

== Personal life ==
Mikati is married to May Domani, and together they have three children.

== Sources ==
- Dewailly, Bruno (2012), "Les transformations du leadership tripolitain : le cas de Nagib Mikati", in Mermier, F.; Mervin, S. (eds.), Leaders et partisans au Liban, Paris: Karthala − IFPO − IISMM, pp. 165–185, ISBN 978-2-8111-0595-2

Political offices
Preceded by Omar Karami	Prime Minister of Lebanon; 2005	Succeeded by Fouad Siniora
Preceded by Saad Hariri	Prime Minister of Lebanon; 2011–2014	Succeeded by Tammam Salam
Preceded by Hassan Diab	Prime Minister of Lebanon; 2021–2025	Succeeded by Nawaf Salam
