= List of Singaporeans by net worth =

This is a list of Singapore-based billionaires based on an annual assessment of wealth and assets compiled and published by Forbes magazine.

== 2026 Singapore-based billionaires list ==
SG Rank	Name	Net worth (USD)	Citizenship	Source of wealth
1	Eduardo Saverin	32.9 billion	Brazil	Facebook
2	Kwek Leng Beng	16.1 billion	Singapore	Hong Leong Group
3	Robert Ng & Philip Ng	14.3 billion	Singapore	Far East Organization
4	Lee family	13.8 billion	Singapore	OCBC
5	Goh family	13.5 billion	Singapore	Nippon Paint
6	Wee family	12 billion	Singapore	United Overseas Bank
7	Khoo family	11 billion	Singapore	Maybank
8	Li Xiting	10 billion	Singapore	Mindray
9	Leo KoGuan	8.5 billion	United States	SHI International Corp
10	Forrest Li	7.7 billion	Singapore	Sea Ltd
11	Kwee brothers	7.4 billion	Singapore	Pontiac Land Group
12	Zhang Yong & Shu Ping	7.2 billion	Singapore	Haidilao
13	Kuok Khoon Hong	4.7 billion	Singapore	Wilmar International
14	Gang Ye	4.3 billion	Singapore	Sea Ltd
15	Lien family	3.8 billion	Singapore	United Overseas Bank
16	Ho family	3.45 billion	Singapore	United Overseas Bank
17	Arvind Tiku	3.4 billion	India	AT Holdings & AT Investments
18	Ji Qi	3.35 billion	Singapore	H World Group Limited
19	Raj Kumar & Kishin RK	3.3 billion	Singapore	Royal Holdings/RB Capital
20	Choo Chong Ngen	3.2 billion	Singapore	Hotel 81
21	Robert Friedland	3.05 billion	United States	Ivanhoe Mines
22	Richard Chandler	3 billion	New Zealand	Clermont Group
23	Liang Xinjun	2.8 billion	Singapore	Fosun International
24	Lim Hock Chee	2.7 billion	Singapore	Sheng Siong
25	Oei Hong Leong	2.65 billion	Singapore	investments
26	Ron Sim	2.4 billion	Singapore	Osim International
27	Asok Kumar Hiranandani	2.35 billion	Singapore	Royal Brothers
28	Sam Goi	2.25 billion	Singapore	Tee Yih Jia
29	Koh Wee Meng	2.2 billion	Singapore	Fragrance Group
30	Ong Beng Seng & Christina Ong	2.1 billion	Singapore	HPL, COMO Group, Mulberry Group
31	Chew Gek Khim	1.95 billion	Singapore	Straits Trading Company
32	Yao Hsiao Tung	1.9 billion	Singapore	Hi-P Group
33	Peter Lim	1.85 billion	Singapore	Wilmar International, investments
34	David Xueling Li	1.8 billion	China	JOYY
35	Min-Liang Tan	1.75 billion	Singapore	Razer Inc.
36	Tang Wee Kit	1.65 billion	Singapore	Tang Holdings
37	Raymond Zage	1.6 billion	Singapore	Tiga Investments
38	Lim Chap Huat	1.55 billion	Singapore	Soilbuild Group
39	John Lim	1.5 billion	Singapore	ARA Asset Management
40	Teo Swee Ann	1.48 billion	Singapore	Espressif Systems
41	Chua Thian Poh	1.45 billion	Singapore	Ho Bee Land
42	Binny Bansal	1.4 billion	India	Flipkart
43	Michael Kum	1.37 billion	Singapore	M&L Hospitality
44	David Chen	1.35 billion	Singapore	Sea Ltd
45	Lim Kaling	1.33 billion	Singapore	Razer Inc.
46	Henry Ng & siblings	1.32 billion	Singapore	Pan-United
47	Zhong Sheng Jian	1.3 billion	Singapore	Yanlord Land
48	Quek Leng Chye	1.2 billion	Singapore	Hong Leong Group
49	Gordon Tang & Celine Tang	1.1 billion	China	SingHaiyi
50	Wong brothers	1 billion	Singapore	Charles & Keith
