= Korean Singaporean =

Korean Singaporean or Singaporean Korean may refer to:

- Koreans in Singapore
- Singaporeans in North Korea
- Singaporeans in South Korea
- North Korea–Singapore relations
- South Korea–Singapore relations
- Multiracial people of Korean and Singaporean descent
