= List of Southeast Asian people by net worth =

List of the richest people in Southeast Asia

Forbes magazine annually lists the world's wealthiest individuals – "The World's Richest People". What follows is the list of billionaires (in U.S. dollars) in Southeast Asia, issued for 2024.

== 2024 ==
Top ten richest identified to a Southeast Asian country, according to Forbes magazine. Family members of royals or politicians are not included.

| World Rank | Name | Age | Country | Worth (USD) | Residence |
|---|---|---|---|---|---|
| 27 | Prajogo Pangestu | 79 | Indonesia | 43.3 billion | Indonesia |
| 66 | Low Tuck Kwong | 75 | Indonesia | 27.4 billion | Indonesia |
| 71 | Robert Budi Hartono | 83 | Indonesia | 26.5 billion | Indonesia |
| 76 | Michael Hartono | 84 | Indonesia | 25.5 billion | Indonesia |
| 103 | Li Xiting | 73 | Singapore | 15.1 billion | China |
| 154 | Goh Cheng Liang | 96 | Singapore | 12.7 billion | Singapore |
| 159 | Dhanin Chearavanont | 84 | Thailand | 12.5 billion | Thailand |
| 176 | Robert Kuok | 100 | Malaysia | 11.8 billion | Hong Kong |
| 177 | Charoen Sirivadhanabhakdi | 79 | Thailand | 11.3 billion | Thailand |
| 190 | Manuel Villar | 74 | Philippines | 11 billion | Philippines |

== Number of billionaires by country ==
As of 2025, limited to countries in Southeast Asia.

| Rank | Country | Number of billionaires | Richest billionaire |
|---|---|---|---|
| 1 | Indonesia | 56 | Prajogo Pangestu |
| 2 | Singapore | 39 | Li Xiting |
| 3 | Thailand | 24 | Dhanin Chearavanont |
| 4 | Malaysia | 17 | Robert Kuok |
| 5 | Philippines | 16 | Teresita Sy-Coson and siblings |
| 6 | Vietnam | 6 | Pham Nhat Vuong |

== See also ==
- List of wealthiest families
- Lists of people by nationality
- The World's Billionaires
