= North Korea–Singapore relations =

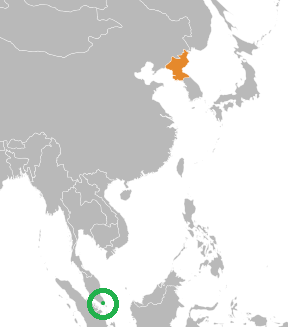

- Singapore: North Korea

North Korea–Singapore relations (Korean: 싱가포르-조선민주주의인민공화국 관계) are bilateral relations between North Korea and Singapore.

Singapore and North Korea established diplomatic relations on 8 November 1975. North Korea maintains an embassy in Singapore while the latter has accredited a non-resident ambassador to Pyongyang from Beijing. The current North Korean ambassador to Singapore is Ri Kil Song.

Relationships between the two countries are currently not active at the official level, and Singapore suspended trade relations with North Korea in November 2017 and have not resumed since then.

North Korean citizens could enter Singapore visa-free till mid 2016, when the rules were changed and North Koreans require a visa to enter Singapore. Elite North Koreans occasionally travel to Singapore for medical treatment. Singaporeans holding a normal passport will also need a visa after obtaining authorization from the North Korean government to visit North Korea for both business and tourism.

== International organizations ==
North Korea and Singapore both belong to the Non-Aligned Movement, with Singapore joining in 1970, and North Korea in 1976. North Korea has also been a participant at the ASEAN Regional Forum since 2000, which is organized by ASEAN, of which Singapore is a founding member. The North Korea foreign minister traditionally visits Singapore after or before every ARF meeting.

== Official visits ==
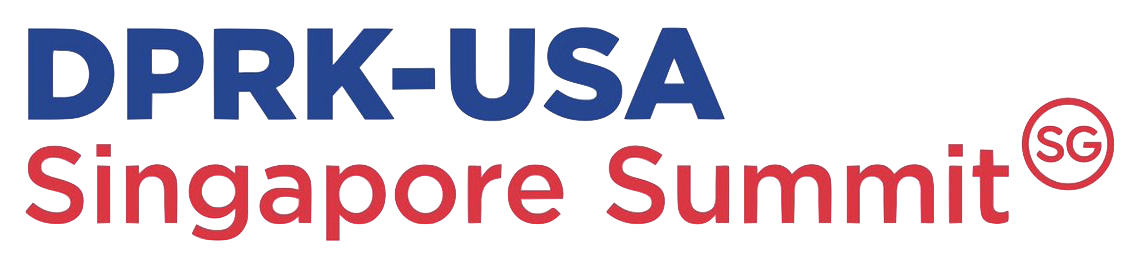
Logo of the 2018 North Korea–United States summit, used by Singapore

North Korea has organized official visits semi-regularly to Singapore, often in conjunction with visits to other Southeast Asian countries. In 2014, Foreign Minister Ri Su Yong visited Singapore. In 2012, the President of North Korea Supreme People’s Assembly, visited Singapore. Other North Korean elites that have visited includes Kim Jong Un’s family members Kim Jong Nam (deceased), Kim Jong-Chul, and Jang Sung Taek (deceased), as well as other key government figures, such as Pak Nam Gi (deceased).

Singapore's then Minister of Foreign Affairs, George Yeo, visited North Korea in 2008. Ministry of Foreign Affairs Permanent Secretary Bilahari Kausikan visited North Korea in 2006 and 2008.

From 10 to 14 June 2018, the North Korean leader Kim Jong-un visited Singapore for the 2018 North Korea–United States summit, and met Singapore's Prime Minister Lee Hsien Loong the day he reached Singapore. Additionally, Singapore's Minister of Foreign Affairs Vivian Balakrishnan paid an official visit to North Korea from 7–8 June, at the invitation of North Korea's Foreign Minister, Ri Yong Ho.

From 26 to 27 May 2026, Singaporean Foreign Minister Vivian Balakrishnan visited Pyongyang at the invitation of his North Korean counterpart Choe Son-hui. The ministers engaged in candid discussions on various regional and international issues, including developments on the Korean Peninsula.

== Economic training ==
North Koreans also frequently visit Singapore for training programs on economic policy, entrepreneurship and law largely through Singapore-based non-governmental organization Choson Exchange’s programs. North Koreans have a positive view of Singapore's economic development and its political stability. Choson Exchange is a Singapore-based NGO focused on supporting entrepreneurship in North Korea. From 2011 to 2016, the organization brought over 100 North Koreans to the country. Choson Exchange was founded by a Singaporean, Geoffrey See.

== Relief work ==
Singapore-based disaster relief group Mercy Relief has conducted relief work in North Korea in 2012, following flooding in the country. The organization donated US$200,000 worth of relief supplies following an appeal from the North Korean Ambassador to Singapore.

== Economic relations ==
Various businesspeople from Singapore have expressed interest in North Korea's economy and the country's market if it becomes more liberalised and opened up and North Korea has made attempts to attract and court Singaporean businesspeople to gain foreign investments. In 2008, the Singapore Business Federation laid down a Memorandum of Understanding to allow for and facilitate business exchanges with North Korea. In 2010, Singapore ranked as North Korea's 10th largest trade partner while eighth in 2016. Before 2017, North Korea reportedly exported sand to support Singapore's massive land reclamation and construction needs. There is a visible Singaporean influence in Korean consumption in the capital: beer, soft drinks and other processed foods are imported from Singapore; supermarkets and fast food restaurants have been set up by Singaporean businesspeople.

Instances of relations noticeably souring include 2016 when a Singaporean Chinpo Shipping Company was fined $125,700 in violation of United Nations-led sanctions smuggling disassembled radar systems, missiles, MiG fighter jets and engines from Cuba to North Korea. With a series of nuclear tests from North Korea in 2017, Singapore has officially suspended trade ties with North Korea under UN sanctions from November 2017. Any person that imports or exports commercially traded goods from or to North Korea will be charged of an offence and if found guilty, either fined and/or imprisoned.

In 2018, Singapore also revoked all work permits of North Koreans, the move is in line with the enhanced sanctions in the UNSC Resolution 2397 (2017). These sanctions, however, were briefly suspended during the 2018 North Korea-US summit.

In 2022, a Singaporean company was charged for exporting beverages to North Korea and put sanctioned on any trade between the two countries.

== Diplomatic missions ==
North Korea maintains an embassy in Singapore. The embassy has previously been located at the Golden Mile Complex, and a five-bedroom house at 60 Joo Chiat Lane. In 2016, it was moved to the 15th floor of High Street Centre, an office tower located on North Bridge Road. There are a total of eight consulate staff and their family members registered with Singapore's Ministry of Foreign Affairs as of 2018.
