= DCIS =

DCIS may refer to:

- Defense Criminal Investigative Service, the criminal investigative arm of the Office of the Inspector General, U.S. Department of Defense
- Dover Court International School, an international school in Dover, Singapore
- Ductal carcinoma in situ, a precancerous type of mammary ductal carcinoma
