= Master Chef =

Master Chef may refer to:

- Chef de cuisine, an occupational title of the main chef in a restaurant
- MasterChef, a competitive cooking television show
- Master Chef, a brand of crepe pastry produced by the Singaporean company Tee Yih Jia
- "Masterchef", an episode of The Wind in the Willows

== See also ==
- Master Chief (disambiguation)
