= Goh Hup Jin =

Singaporean businessman

- Born: 1952 or 1953 (age 73–74); Colony of Singapore
- Education: Tokyo University; University of California
- Title: Chairman, Nippon Paint
- Parent: Goh Cheng Liang

Goh Hup Jin (traditional Chinese: 吳學人; born 1952/1953) is a Singaporean businessman, and the chairman of Nippon Paint since March 2018.

== Early life ==
Goh Hup Jin is the son of Goh Cheng Liang, a Singaporean billionaire.

Goh earned a bachelor's degree in engineering from Tokyo University, and an MBA from the University of California.

== Career ==
Goh has been the chairman of Nippon Paint since March 2018, and runs the family's privately held joint venture, Nipsea.

== Personal life ==
Goh owns a house in Singapore's Queen Astrid Park district, which he bought for US$44.5 million in July 2016.
