= Xu Hang =

Chinese billionaire entrepreneur

Xu Hang 徐航
- Born: 1967 (age 58–59); Guangzhou, Guangdong, China
- Education: Tsinghua University (BA, MA); China Europe International Business School (EMBA)
- Occupations: Entrepreneur; philanthropist
- Years active: 1991–present
- Title: Co-founder of Mindray

Xu Hang (born 1967) is a Chinese billionaire business magnate. He is the co-founder of the Shenzhen-based multinational medical instrumentation manufacturer Mindray Medical International.

Xu Hang holds a BA degree from Tsinghua University. Later he did his MA in biomedical engineering at the Department of Electrical Engineering of Tsinghua. After graduation, Xu became famous for inventing China's first domestic color B-ultrasound machine, for which he even won the National Progress Award. In 1991, he became one of the founders of Mindray, together with Li Xiting and Cheng Minghe (成明和), which soon became the nation's largest high-tech medical equipment manufacturer. In 2001, Xu also established Pengrui Investment Group Co., Ltd which focuses on high-tech environmental protection, real estate and ecotourism project development. In 2012, he resigned from the co-CEO position of Minday but continued serving as the chairman of the company.

Xu made Forbes magazine's 2022 The World's Billionaires list with an estimated wealth of US$16.1 billion and occupied the 113th position in the world.

In 2023 and 2024 major home sales in Beverly Hills, Hong Kong, Newport Beach, and New York City were linked to him.
