= Master Chief =

Master Chief May refer to:

- Master chief petty officer, a military enlisted rate in the United States Navy and Coast Guard
  - Master Chief Petty Officer of the Coast Guard, a unique non-commissioned rank and position in the United States Coast Guard
  - Master Chief Petty Officer of the Navy, a unique non-commissioned rank of the United States Navy
- Master Chief Musician
- Master Chief Hospital Corpsman
- Master Chief (Halo), the protagonist of the Halo series

== See also ==
- Master Chef (disambiguation)
