= Sam Goi =

Singaporean businessman

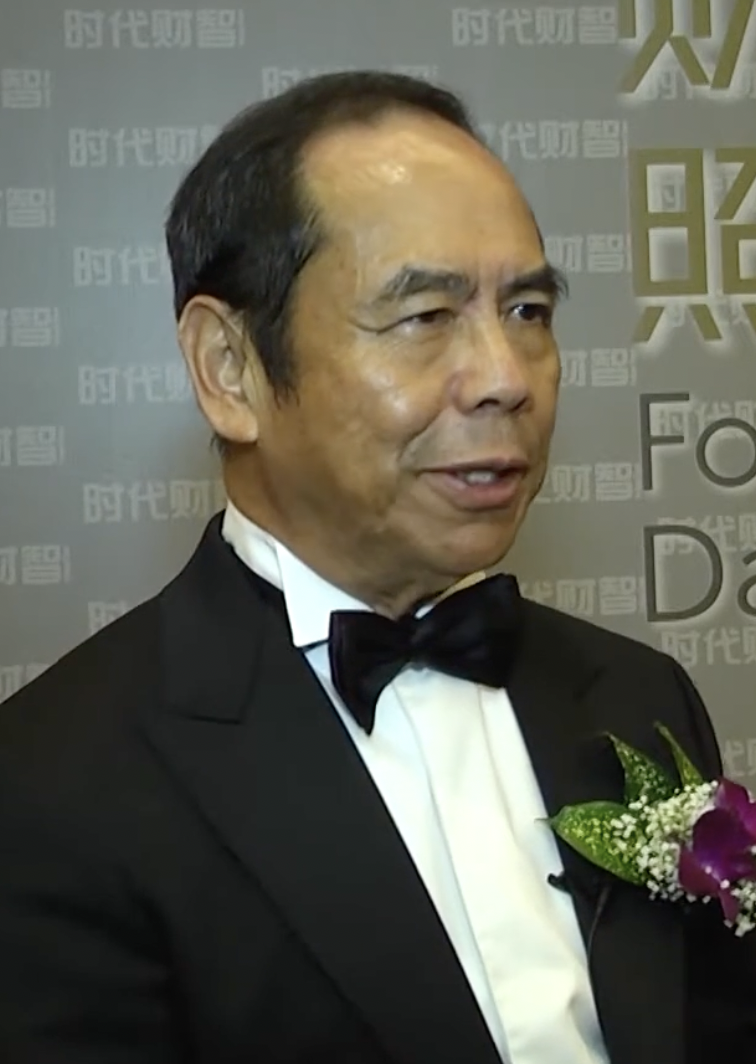
- Goi in 2015

Non-Resident Ambassador of Singapore to Brazil
- In office 20 April 2018 – 30 June 2026
- Minister: Vivian Balakrishnan
- Preceded by: Choo Chiau Beng
- Succeeded by: Chia Wei Wen

Personal details
- Born: Sam Goi Seng Hui; 26 April 1949 (age 77) Fuqing, Fujian province, China
- Education: Dunman High School
- Known for: Investor of Teh Yi Jia, "Singapore's Popiah King"

Sam Goi Seng Hui (Chinese: 魏成輝; pinyin: Wèi Chénghuī; born 26 April 1949) is a Singaporean businessman who is also known as Singapore's "Popiah King". He is the chairman of Tee Yih Jia, a food manufacturing company, well known for selling spring roll pastry, or locally known as "popiah" (薄饼) skins,

In 2008, he was the largest single shareholder in Super Coffeemix. In 2014, he won the 2013 Businessman of the Year award at the Singapore Business Awards which were organised by local financial newspaper, The Business Times, and DHL Express.

Goi has four children. His youngest son, Ben Goi, was chief operating officer of Tee Yih Jia until his death in 2019 from a stroke.
