= Nippon Paint =

Japanese paints company

Nippon Paint Holdings Co., Ltd.

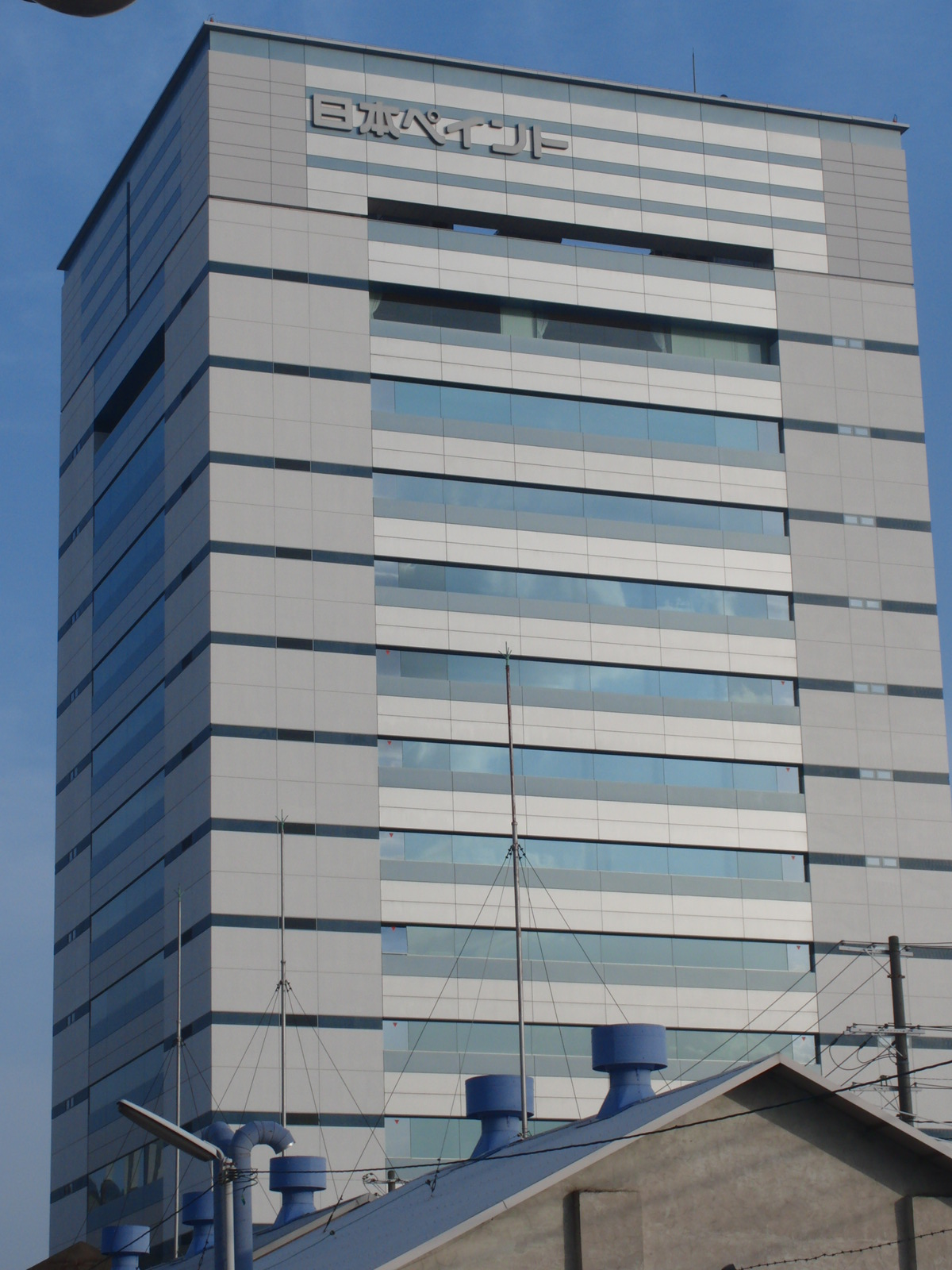
- Main office in Kita-ku, Osaka
- Native name: 日本ペイントホールディングス株式会社
- Type: Public KK
- Traded as: TYO: 4612
- ISIN: JP3749400002
- Industry: Chemicals
- Founded: March 14, 1881; 145 years ago
- Founder: Jujiro Motegi
- Headquarters: Oyodo Kita, Kita-ku, Osaka 531-8511, Japan
- Area served: Worldwide
- Key people: Masaaki Tanaka (President); Goh Hup Jin (Chairman)
- Products: Chemicals; Decorative paints; Industrial finishing products; Coatings; Fine chemicals
- Revenue: ▲¥1.30 trillion (2022)
- Operating income: ▲¥111.9 billion (2022)
- Net income: ▲¥79.4 billion (2022)
- Total assets: ▲¥2.44 trillion (2022)
- Total equity: ▲¥1.15 trillion (2022)
- Number of employees: 33,000 (2022)
- Website: nipponpaint-holdings.com

Nippon Paint Holdings Co., Ltd. (日本ペイントホールディングス株式会社, Nippon Peinto Hōrudingusu Kabushiki-gaisha) is a Japanese paint and paint products manufacturing company. It is the world's fourth largest paint manufacturer, as measured by revenue in 2020. It operates and serves markets in numerous nations.

== History ==
The company was founded in 1881 by Jujiro Motegi as "Komyosha" (Yamato Jujiro Shoten). In 1898, the company was incorporated and renamed Nippon Paint Manufacturing, and in 1927, the company's name was changed to Nippon Paint.

In 1954, Nippon Paint established a 50/50 joint venture with Bee Chemical. In 2006, it became a wholly owned subsidiary of Nippon Paint.

In October 2014, Nippon Paint was reorganized into a holding company, and the company adopted its current name.

In August 2020, the Singaporean paints and coatings manufacturer Wuthelam Group raised its stake in Nippon Paint from 39% to 58.7% in exchange for its stake in the joint venture in Singapore.

=== Nippon Paint in Singapore ===
In 1955, Goh Cheng Liang set up his first paint shop in Singapore and became the main local distributor of Nippon Paint. In 1962, the company set up a joint venture with Goh Cheng Liang, with a 60-40 holding, the Nipsea Management Group. In 1965, Nippon Paint set up its first paint manufacturing plant in Singapore.

In November 2014, except for Nippon Paint Indonesia, the NIPSEA Group officially became a subsidiary of Nippon Paint Holdings.

=== Nippon Paint in the United States ===
In 2016, Nippon Paint entered into a merger agreement with Dunn-Edwards, a manufacturer of architectural, industrial, and high-performance paints. After March 2017, Dunn-Edwards became a wholly owned subsidiary of Nippon Paint USA.
