= Geoffrey See =

- Born: Singapore
- Education: University of Pennsylvania; Yale University; Tsinghua University
- Occupation: Businessman
- Known for: Entrepreneurship in North Korea

Geoffrey See is a Singaporean businessman. In 2007, he founded non-profit group Choson Exchange, which supports change in North Korea through exposure to knowledge and information in business, entrepreneurship and law. The organization has trained more than 2000 North Koreans.

In 2019, Geoffrey was nominated to the World Economic Forum as a Young Global Leader.

== Early life and education ==
See graduated from the Wharton School. He also holds a master’s degree in East Asian studies from Yale University, and was an exchange student at Tsinghua University.

== Founding Choson Exchange ==
After spending 2 years working on North Korean issues outside of North Korea, See visited the country in 2007 and was surprised that young North Koreans were deeply interested in business and entrepreneurship. He was deeply impacted when a North Korean university student told him that she wanted to go into business to prove that females can be business leaders in a patriarchal society. He spent two years trying to find a way to educate this emerging generation inside the country. In 2009, he founded Choson Exchange.

Geoffrey founded Choson Exchange and developed it into the largest business network in North Korea and the most active organization training Koreans in business, economics and entrepreneurship. By 2018, Choson Exchange has trained over 2000 North Koreans, brought over 100 volunteers to North Korea and over 100 Koreans to Singapore. See is frequently cited in the media on changes in North Korea's economy, society and business environment. See's work on Choson Exchange has been profiled as a Harvard Business School case study and in the BBC, Financial Times, The Economist, The Atlantic, JoongAng Ilbo, The Straits Times and other media.

The Washington Post in 2018 cited Choson Exchange's work as part of the rationale for Singapore hosting the first Summit between the leaders of the United States and DPRK, Donald Trump and Kim Jong Un.

== Singapore–South Korea relations ==
In July 2018, Seoul Mayor Park Won-soon visited Singapore and held a meeting with Geoffrey See and Choson Exchange to express appreciation for their work introducing economic policy, business and entrepreneurship knowledge to DPR Koreans. After the meeting, Mayor Park told South Korean media that Seoul should initiate startup exchanges with North Korea, with the work of Choson Exchange as a reference for what is possible and should be done.
