= George Yeo =

Singaporean politician (born 1954)

- 杨荣文
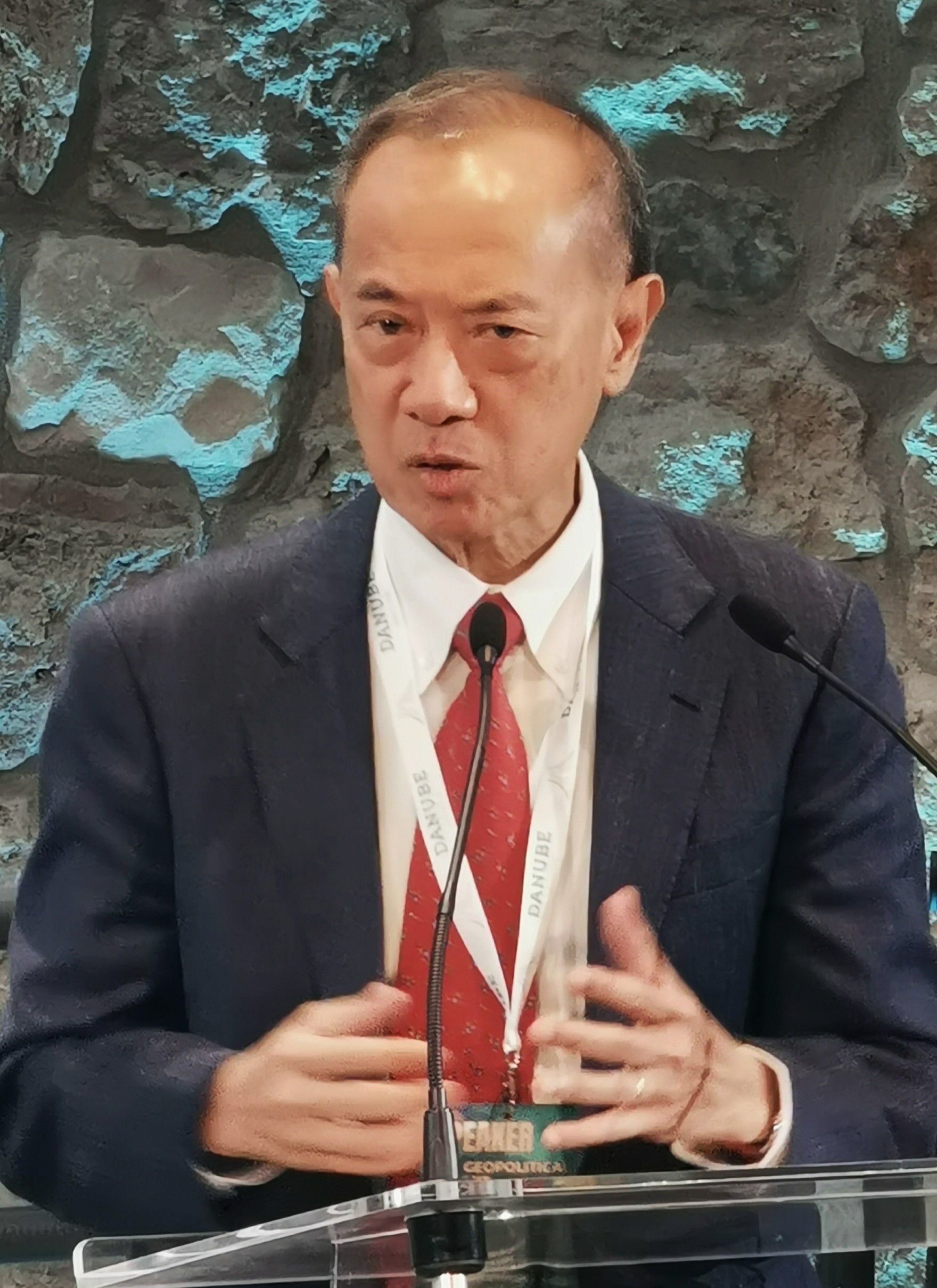
- Yeo in 2025

Minister for Foreign Affairs
- In office 12 August 2004 – 20 May 2011
- Prime Minister: Lee Hsien Loong
- Preceded by: S. Jayakumar
- Succeeded by: K. Shanmugam

Minister for Trade and Industry
- In office 3 June 1999 – 12 August 2004
- Prime Minister: Goh Chok Tong
- Preceded by: Yeo Cheow Tong
- Succeeded by: Lim Hng Kiang

Minister for Health
- In office 2 January 1994 – 25 January 1997
- Prime Minister: Goh Chok Tong
- Preceded by: Yeo Cheow Tong
- Succeeded by: Yeo Cheow Tong

Minister for Information and the Arts
- In office 1 July 1991 – 2 June 1999; Acting: 28 November 1990 – 30 June 1991
- Prime Minister: Goh Chok Tong
- Preceded by: Yeo Ning Hong
- Succeeded by: Lee Yock Suan

Member of the Singapore Parliament for Aljunied GRC
- In office 3 September 1988 – 7 May 2011
- Preceded by: Constituency established
- Succeeded by: WP gain
- Majority: 1988: 7,645 (12.67%); 1991: N/A (walkover); 1997: 32,954 (34.04%); 2001: N/A (walkover); 2006: 16,250 (12.18%)

Personal details
- Born: George Yeo Yong-Boon; 13 September 1954 (age 72) Colony of Singapore
- Other political affiliations: People's Action Party (1988–2011)
- Spouse: Jennifer Leong Lai Peng
- Children: 4
- Relatives: Gwendoline Yeo (niece)
- Education: Christ's College, Cambridge (BA); Harvard University (MBA)

Military service
- Branch/service: Singapore Army; Republic of Singapore Air Force
- Years of service: 1976–1988
- Rank: Brigadier-General

George Yeo Yong-Boon (Note: Chinese: 杨荣文; Pe̍h-ūe-jī: Iôⁿ Iông-bûng; pinyin: Yáng Róngwén) (born 13 September 1954) is a Singaporean former politician and brigadier-general. A former member of the governing People's Action Party (PAP), Yeo was a Member of Parliament (MP) for Aljunied Group Representation Constituency (GRC) between 1988 and 2011.

Yeo served in the Singapore Army and later Republic of Singapore Air Force (RSAF) between 1976 and 1988 and attained the rank of Brigadier-General. He also served as Chief of Staff – Air Staff between 1985 and 1986, and Director of Joint Operations and Planning at the Ministry of Defence (MINDEF) between 1986 and 1988.

Yeo served as Minister for Foreign Affairs between 2004 and 2011. He also served as Minister for Information and the Arts between 1990 and 1999, Minister for Health between 1994 and 1997 and Minister for Trade and Industry between 1999 and 2004.

== Education ==
Yeo was educated at St. Stephen's School, St. Patrick's School—where he topped in his class for his O-Levels and St. Joseph's Institution before graduating from Christ's College at the University of Cambridge in 1976, majoring in engineering, under the President's Scholarship and Singapore Armed Forces Overseas Scholarship.

He subsequently went on to complete a Master in Business Administration degree from Harvard Business School in 1985 as a Baker Scholar.

== Military career ==
Upon returning from the United Kingdom, Yeo served as a commissioned officer in the Singapore Armed Forces (SAF). He served as a signals officer in the Singapore Army, before transferring to the Republic of Singapore Air Force (RSAF).

In 1985, Yeo returned to Singapore and served as Chief of Staff – Air Staff between 1985 and 1986, and Director of Joint Operations and Planning at the Ministry of Defence (MINDEF) between 1986 and 1988. He also led the team which conceptualised the SAFTI Military Institute.

Yeo attained the rank Brigadier-General before leaving the SAF in 1988.

== Political career ==
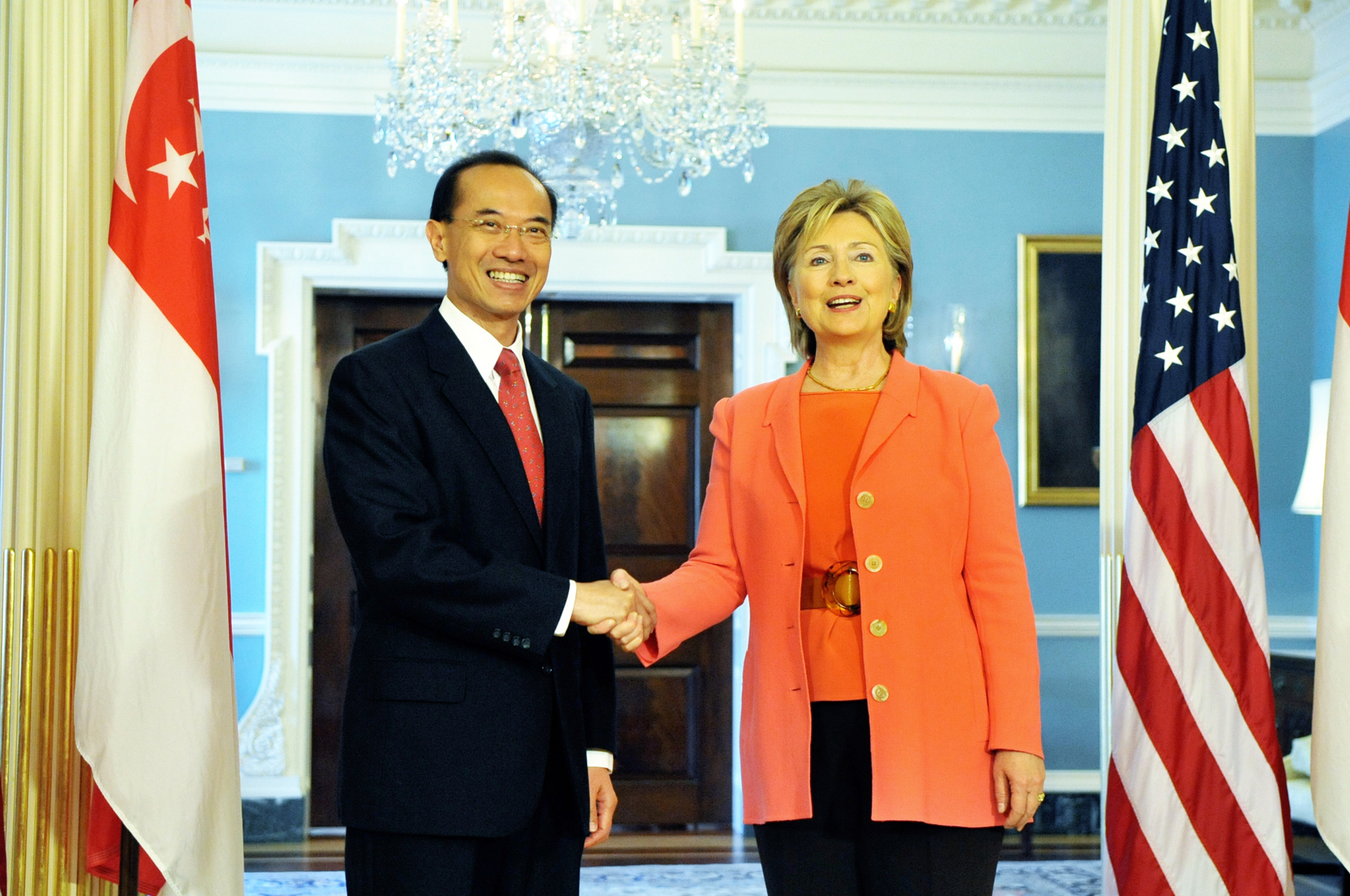
Yeo with American Secretary of State Hillary Clinton in 2009

Yeo made his political debut in the 1988 general election as part of a three-member PAP team contesting in the newly created Aljunied GRC and won with 56.33% of the vote against a team from the Singapore Democratic Party (SDP).

Following his election into Parliament, Yeo served in various ministries, including the Ministry of Finance, Ministry of Information, Communications and the Arts, Ministry of Health, Ministry of Trade and Industry and the Ministry of Foreign Affairs.

Yeo represented the Eurasian community in the Cabinet at their request. He was the chairman of the PAP's youth wing from 1991 to 2000, which saw a renaming to Young PAP (YPAP) in 1993. As an incentive for joining the YPAP, he said people joining the YPAP could take positions different from central party leadership.

In 2006, Yeo and the rest of his team faced the Workers' Party (WP) and won with the election's narrowest margin, with 56.09% of the vote to 43.91% for the WP.

However, in the 2011 general election, when Yeo led the PAP team for reelection in Aljunied GRC, Yeo's team was defeated by the WP team of Pritam Singh, Sylvia Lim, Faisal Manap, Low Thia Khiang and Chen Show Mao with WP winning 54.72% of the vote. Yeo was one of the first two cabinet ministers since Singaporean independence, as well as the 1963 election, to be defeated for reelection and thus lose their parliamentary seats to the opposition; the other was Lim Hwee Hua, fellow anchor minister for Aljunied GRC before the 2011 election. As a result, both lost their Cabinet positions as well.

On 10 May of the same year, Yeo announced his retirement from politics. During his announcement, Yeo stated that he declined running for presidency later that year despite being approached by Prime Minister Lee Hsien Loong, cited that he was a "free spirit" and he was not "temperamentally suited for such a job", despite being popular in online and have "a flood of support" on post-election. He although stated on his Facebook page that he was "thinking hard" about the possibility of becoming a candidate on 1 June, but on 15 June, Yeo confirmed that he declined standing for presidency. Yeo later revealed that Lee Kuan Yew had encouraged him to run for the presidency; however, Yeo declined, saying that he "was not going to stand if [Lee] had another candidate in mind".

On 5 October, Yeo stepped down from the PAP's Central Executive Committee. However, he continued to be a member of the PAP.

=== Minister for Information, Communications, and the Arts ===
In the 1990s, Yeo pushed for widespread adoption of internet infrastructure in Singapore, stating that it was important for Singapore to retain its role as a regional hub. Its geographical advantage would matter less, and its infrastructural advantage in the exchange of information and ideas would matter more. In 1995, he defended government censorship of the Internet even as it proved technologically challenging to do so: "Censorship can no longer be 100% effective, but even if it is only 20% effective, we should not stop censoring." In what he described as an "anti-pollution measure in cyberspace", Yeo transferred censorship authority from the Telecommunication Authority of Singapore (TAS) to the Singapore Broadcasting Authority (SBA), which was to "concentrate on areas which may undermine public morals, political stability or religious harmony in Singapore". Yeo said the government would focus on monitoring internet communications that broadcast material to millions of users rather than the "narrowcasting" of private communications between individuals.

=== Minister for Trade and Industry ===
As Minister for Trade and Industry, Yeo proposed the idea of having Integrated Resorts (IRs) in Singapore, which would include casinos, which was intensely debated for a year. It ultimately passed and paved the way for the 2 IRs in Singapore, Resorts World Sentosa and Marina Bay Sands, the latter of which was at the Marina Promenade. He later told a group of university students during a dialogue that his late father had a problem with gambling and that his decision to push for the IRs was personally very difficult.

== Post-political career ==
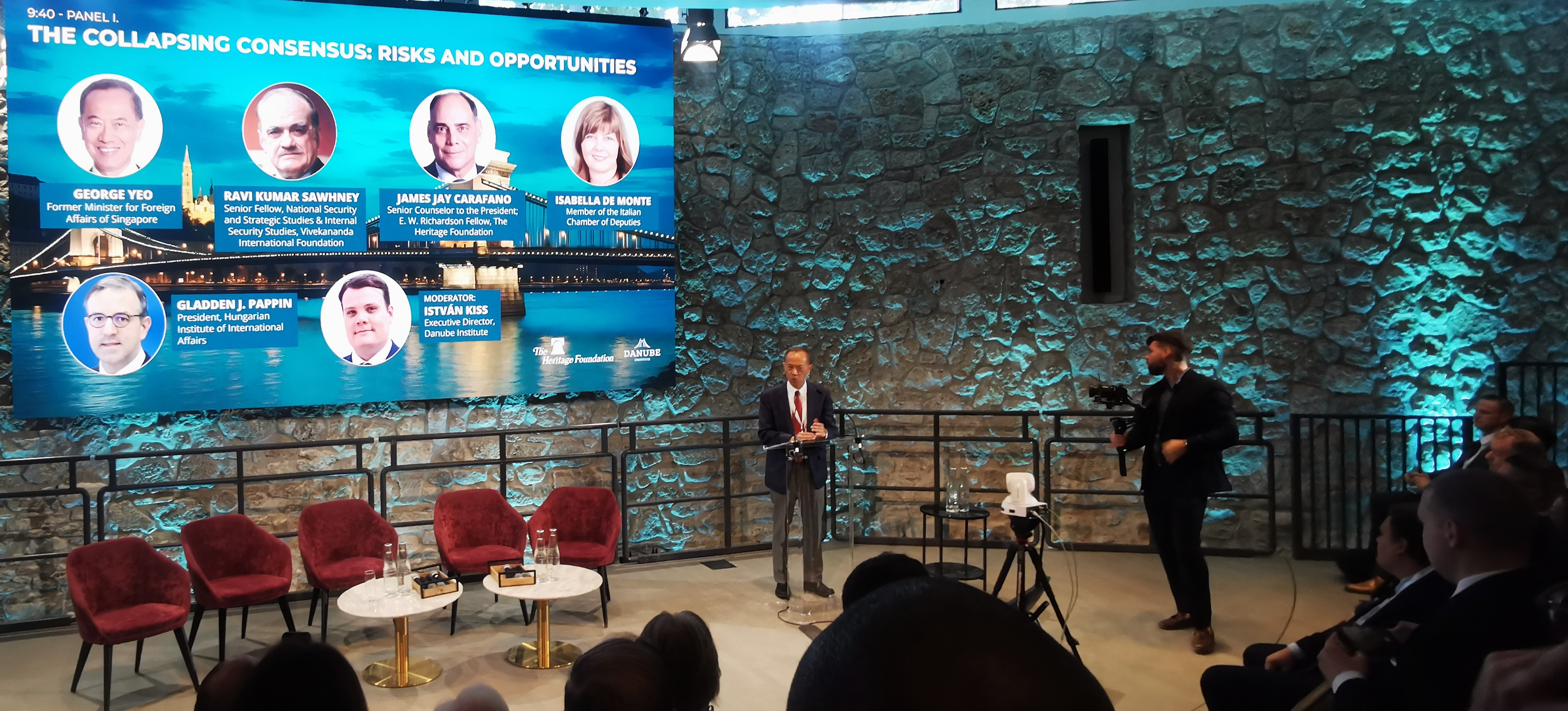
George Yeo speaking at Danube Institute

Yeo has been a visiting scholar at the Lee Kuan Yew School of Public Policy since 2011.

In 2013, Yeo was appointed as a non-official member of the newly established Hong Kong Economic Development Commission.

In 2014, Yeo was named as a member of the Vatican's Council for the Economy. He was amongst the first lay Catholics appointed by the Vatican to oversee organisational and economic issues faced by the Holy See. At that time, Yeo was the only Asian appointed to the commission.

Yeo is currently a member of the Foundation Board of the World Economic Forum, the International Advisory Board of IESE Business School (IAB), the External Advisory Board of the EUI School of Transnational Governance and the Nicolas Berggruen Institute's 21st Century Council.

Yeo was involved in reviving the ancient Buddhist Nalanda University, in Bihar, India. He was chancellor of the Governing Board, as well as its International Advisory Panel. In November 2016, he resigned from the chancellorship of the university, accusing the Indian government of failing to maintain the university's autonomy.

In Singapore, he is also advisor to the Sun Yat Sen Nanyang Memorial Hall and Teochew Poit Ip Huay Kuan, as well as a patron of Lasalle College of the Arts.

=== Private sector ===
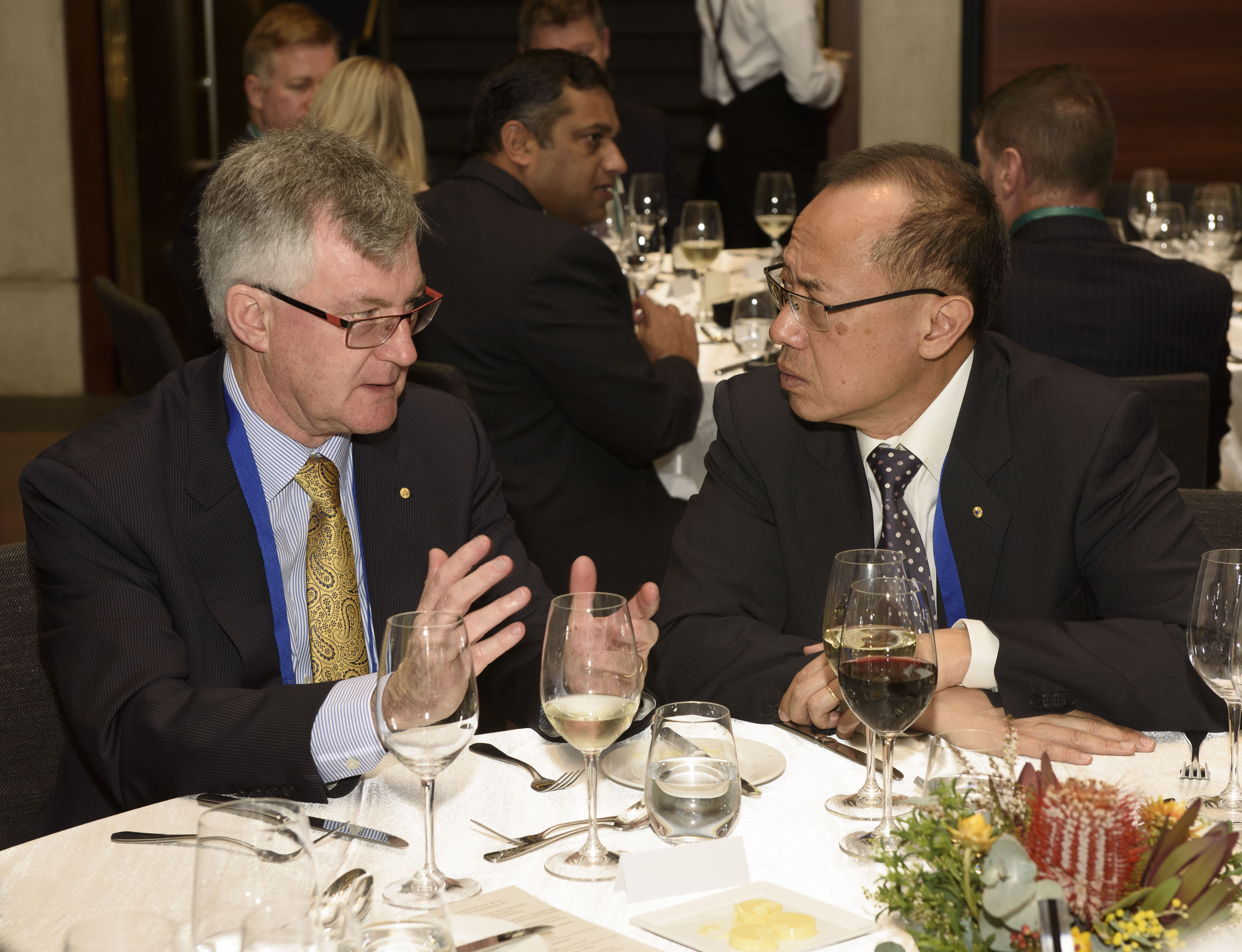
Yeo with Martin Parkinson in 2017

Yeo moved to the private sector in Hong Kong after leaving politics in 2011. He joined the Kuok Group as senior advisor, and became vice chairman of its subsidiary Kerry Group (HK) Pte Ltd in January 2012. In August 2012, he became chairman and executive director of Kerry Logistics Network. He was also a director of Kerry Holdings and non-executive director of Wilmar International. Yeo has also been non-executive director of AIA Group since November 2012.

On 23 August 2020, V3 Group, led by Osim founder Ron Sim, announced that George Yeo would join the group as senior advisor. Yeo is also an independent board director of Nasdaq-listed e-commerce platform Pinduoduo, the largest agriculture platform in China.

Yeo was appointed as an independent non-executive director of Creative Technology in 2021. As of April 2024, George Yeo owns 400,000 shares in Wilmar International, and was appointed as an independent non-executive director.

== Awards and recognition ==
In 2012, Yeo was awarded the Padma Bhushan, by India, the Order of Sikatuna, with the rank of Datu (Grand Cross), by the Philippines, and the Honorary Officer of the Order of Australia, by Australia.

== Personal life ==
A Roman Catholic, Yeo married lawyer Jennifer Leong Lai Peng in 1984. The couple have three sons and a daughter. Yeo also has a niece named Gwendoline Yeo, who is an actress and musician.

In 2004, their youngest son, who has struggled with childhood leukemia since age three, received a bone marrow transplant at St. Jude Children's Research Hospital in Memphis, Tennessee. Recognising the difficulties faced by families in such situations, Leong founded the Viva Foundation to help children with cancer to improve the survival rate and cure of children with cancer, especially childhood leukemia, in Singapore and Southeast Asia. In May 2006, a memorandum of understanding was signed between St. Jude Children's Research Hospital, National University of Singapore (NUS), National University Hospital (NUH) in Singapore, and the VIVA Foundation for Children with Cancer (VIVA).

Yeo is an avid jogger and has participated in the Singapore Marathon 10 km run. He is a student of tai chi, an internal Chinese martial art, and describes himself as "a bit of a Taoist". He has stated that he is pro-China.

== Sources ==
- George Yeo, George Yeo on Bonsai, Banyan and the Tao, edited by Asad-ul Iqbal Latif and Lee Huay Leng, Singapore: World Scientific Publishing, 2015, 686 pages.
- Justin Corfield, Historical Dictionary of Singapore, Lanham, Maryland: Scarecrow Press, 2011, pp. 297–298.
- Justin Corfield and Robin Corfield, Encyclopedia of Singapore, Lanham, Maryland: Scarecrow Press, 2006, pp. 247–248.
- Low Kar Tiang (editor), Who's Who in Singapore, Singapore, 2003, p. 467.

Political offices
| Preceded by ? | Minister of State for Finance; 13 September 1988-28 November 1990 | Succeeded by ? |
| Preceded by ? | Minister of State for Foreign Affairs; 13 September 1988-28 November 1990 | Succeeded by ? |
| Preceded by ? | Senior Minister of State for Foreign Affairs; 28 November 1990-1 July 1991 | Succeeded by ? |
| Preceded by ? | Second Minister for Foreign Affairs; 1 July 1991-2 January 1994 | Succeeded by ? |
| Preceded by Yeo Ning Hong | Minister for Information and the Arts; 28 November 1990 - 1 July 1991 (acting); 1991 - 1999 | Succeeded by Lee Yock Suan |
| Preceded by Yeo Cheow Tong | Minister for Health; 2 January 1994-25 January 1997 | Succeeded by Yeo Cheow Tong |
| Preceded by ? | Minister for Trade and Industry; 3 June 1999 - 12 August 2004 | Succeeded by Lim Hng Kiang |
| Preceded by Shunmugam Jayakumar | Minister for Foreign Affairs; 12 August 2004-7 May 2011 | Succeeded by K Shanmugam |
