= Mindray =

Chinese medical instrumentation manufacturer

Mindray Bio-Medical Electronics Co., Ltd.
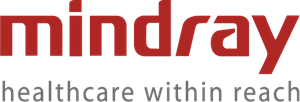

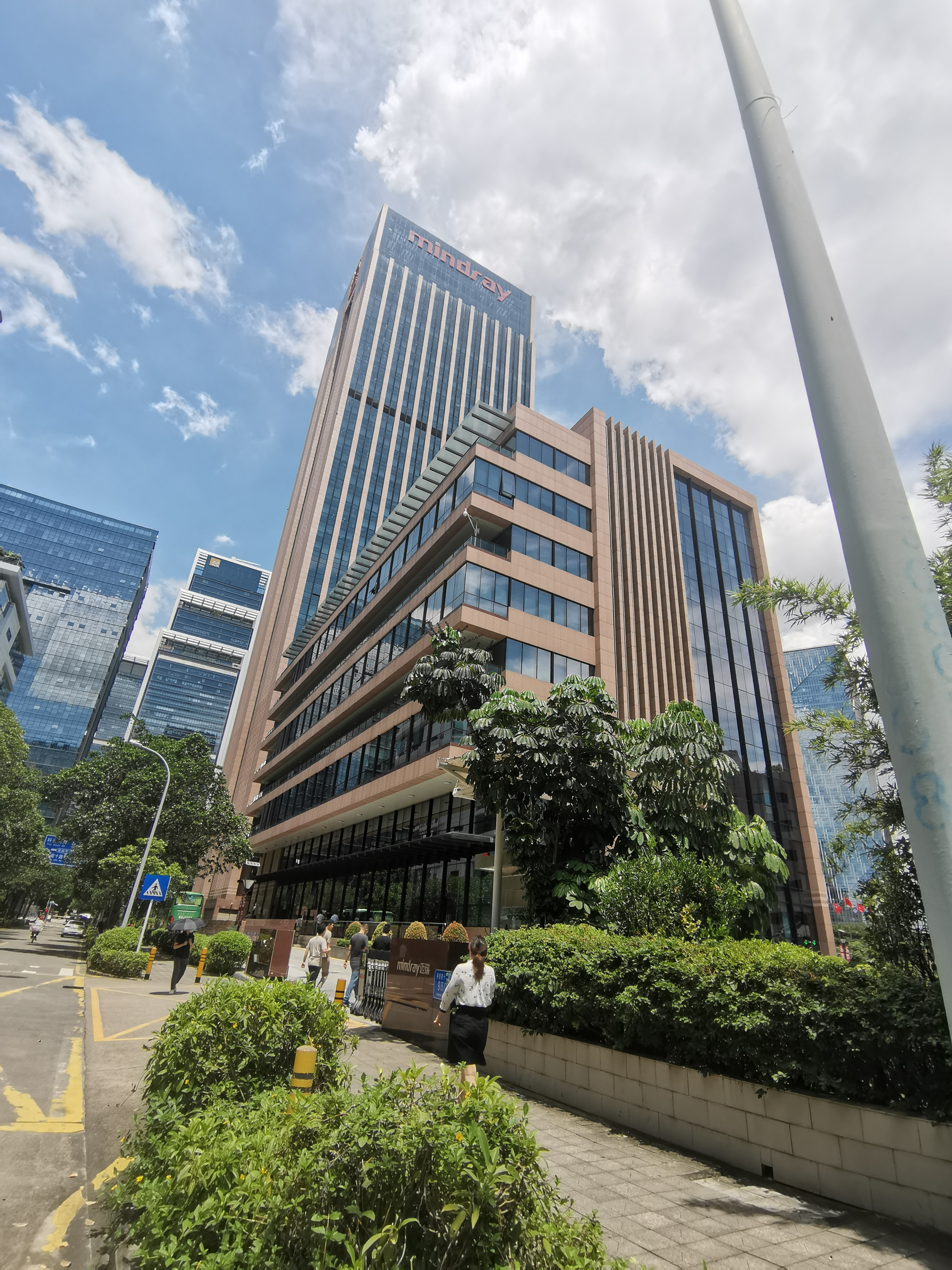
- Headquarters in Shenzhen
- Native name: 迈瑞生物医疗电子股份有限公司
- Company type: Public
- Traded as: SZSE: 300760; CSI A50
- Industry: Healthcare
- Founded: 1991; 35 years ago Shenzhen
- Headquarters: Mindray Building, Shenzhen, Guangdong, China
- Area served: Worldwide
- Key people: Li Xiting (chairman); Xu Hang (co-founder); Cheng Minghe (executive VP); Wu Hao (CEO)
- Products: IT Solutions; Patient Monitors; Ultrasound Systems; Anesthesia Delivery Systems; Total Laboratory Automation (TLA)s; Hematology Analyzers; Ventilators; AEDs
- Revenue: ▲US$5.1 Billion (2024)
- Operating income: ▲US$1.54 Billion (2024)
- Net income: ▲US$1.46 Billion (2024)
- Number of employees: 21,000 (2025)
- Website: mindray.com

Mindray Bio-Medical Electronics Co., Ltd., simply known as Mindray (Chinese: 迈瑞; pinyin: Màiruì), is a Chinese multinational health technology company based in Shenzhen, Guangdong. Mindray designs and produces medical equipment and accessories for both human and veterinary use. The company is organized into three key business lines: Patient Monitoring & Life Support, In-Vitro Diagnostic Products, and Medical Imaging Systems. In 2008, Mindray was recognized as China's largest medical device manufacturer.

== History ==
Mindray was founded in 1991 in Shenzhen, Guangdong by seven former employees of Anke (安科), including Li Xiting (李西廷), Xu Hang (徐航) and Cheng Minghe (成明和). It grew by providing domestic patient monitoring, imaging, and other diagnostic products. Mindray maintains 41 subsidiaries and branch offices in 31 countries, as well as 32 branch offices in China. Mindray was listed on the NYSE in September 2006 and delisted in March 2016 to apply for a re-listing in China's A-Share market. Mindray was re-listed in the Shenzhen Stock Exchange in October 2018.

Mindray faced hiring controversy at the end of 2018 when it rescinded job offers from 254 university students due to changing economic conditions. The company reinstated the offers in early 2019 citing 'corporate social responsibility' after public outcry.

Mindray partnered with Korle Bu Teaching Hospital in January 2019 to improve diagnostic patient care in Ghana. The company donated a SAL 6000 analyzer to improve local lab test efficiency.

== Divisions ==
The Patient Monitoring & Life Support division develops and manufactures multi-parameter patient monitors, biotelemetry systems, anesthesia delivery systems, defibrillators, ECG machines, pulse oxymeters, hospital beds, mounting systems and IT solutions. In 2008, Mindray purchased the Patient Monitoring division of Datascope Corporation for $209 million to expand their presence outside of China.

The In-Vitro Diagnostic division provides data and analysis on blood, urine, and other bodily fluid samples for clinical diagnosis and treatment. This segment offers a range of semi-automated and fully automated diagnostic laboratory instruments for laboratories, clinics, and hospitals. Its products include hematology analyzers, biochemistry analyzers, reagents, a microplate reader and a microplate washer.
