= Dover Court International School =

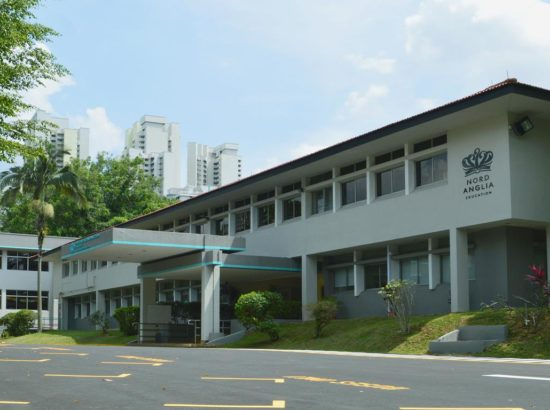
- Dover Court

Location
- 301 Dover Road; Singapore 139644; Singapore; 1.30558°N 103.77695°E

Information
- Former name: Dover Court Preparatory School (1972-2014)
- Type: International school, Independent school
- Established: April 1972; 54 years ago
- Founder: Ernest E. Alliott
- Principal: Christopher Short
- Age range: 3-18 years
- Enrollment: Approximately 1,850 (2021)
- Average class size: 22 students
- Houses: Jurong, Kranji, Newton, Ubin
- Colors: Teal, white
- Athletics conference: ACSIS, FOBISIA
- Accreditation: International Primary Curriculum (IPC); Edexcel; IB World School
- Publication: The Doverian Yearbook (first published as 'The Yearbook' in 1974)
- Affiliation: Federation of British International Schools in Asia (FOBISIA); Council of International Schools (CIS); Nord Anglia Education
- Alumni: Doverians
- Website: https://www.dovercourt.edu.sg

Dover Court International School is an international school in Dover, Singapore. Founded in 1972, the school delivers the English National Curriculum and International Baccalaureate Diploma Program to 2,000 students between the ages of 3 and 18. Over 60 nationalities are represented in the school, with the majority of teachers coming from the United Kingdom. In 2015, Dover Court International School registered with the Committee for Private Education of Singapore and since April 2014 has been part of the Nord Anglia Education group of schools. It is a member of the Federation of British International Schools in Asia (FOBISIA), and accredited by the Council of International Schools (CIS) and the Western Association of Schools and Colleges (WASC).

== History ==
=== Early history ===
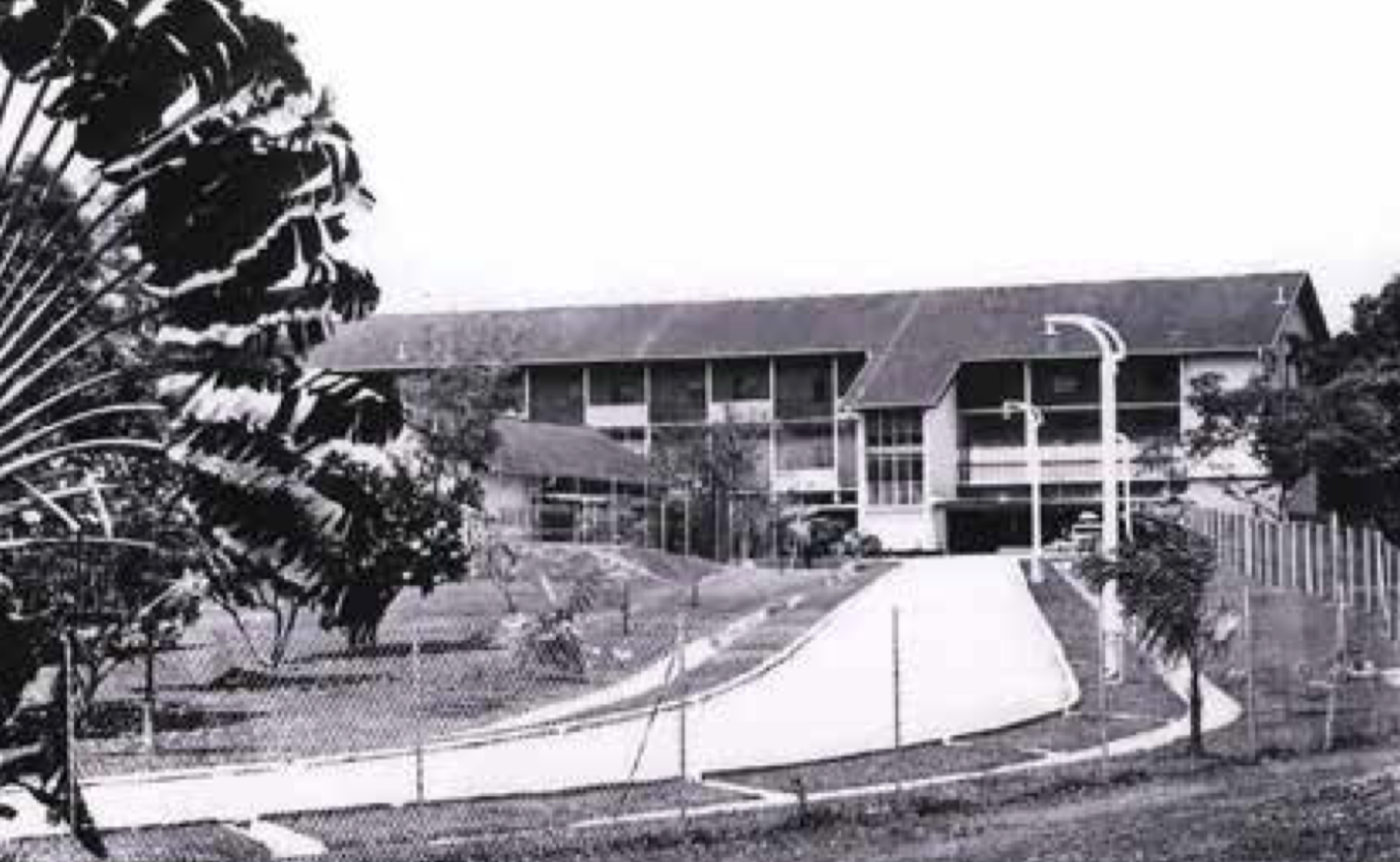
View of Dover Court Preparatory School Main Building (c.1970s).

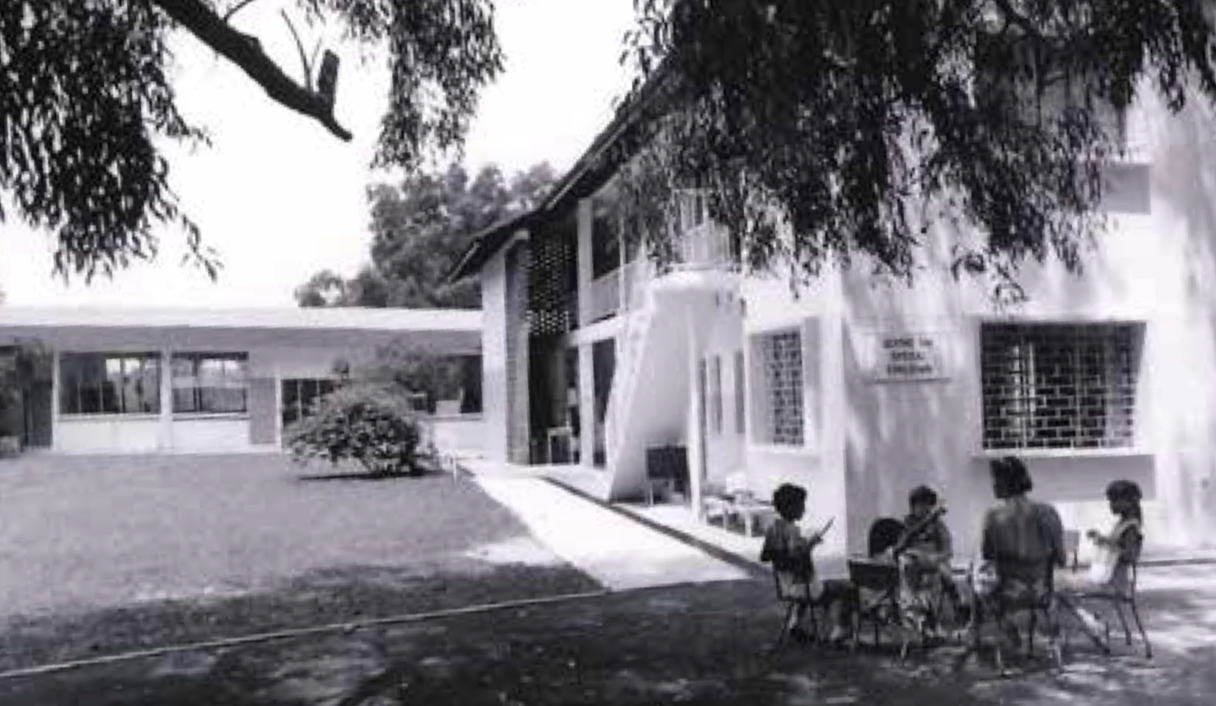
The exterior of the Ernest Alliott Foundation Block at Dover Court Preparatory School. (c.1970s).

Dover Court International School was established in 1972 as Dover Court Preparatory School by Ernest E. Alliott. The brainchild of his wife Margaret Alliott, the school supervisor, Dover Court Preparatory School was established out of a shortage at the time of school places for children under the age of 13. Dover Court Preparatory School was first registered with the Ministry of Education of Singapore in 1972, owned and managed by International Preparatory Schools (Pte) Ltd, later known as Dover Court Preparatory School (Pte) Ltd. Both the school and the company, which was set up in April 1971, were founded by Alliott, who previously had been a British Government Headmaster in Singapore.

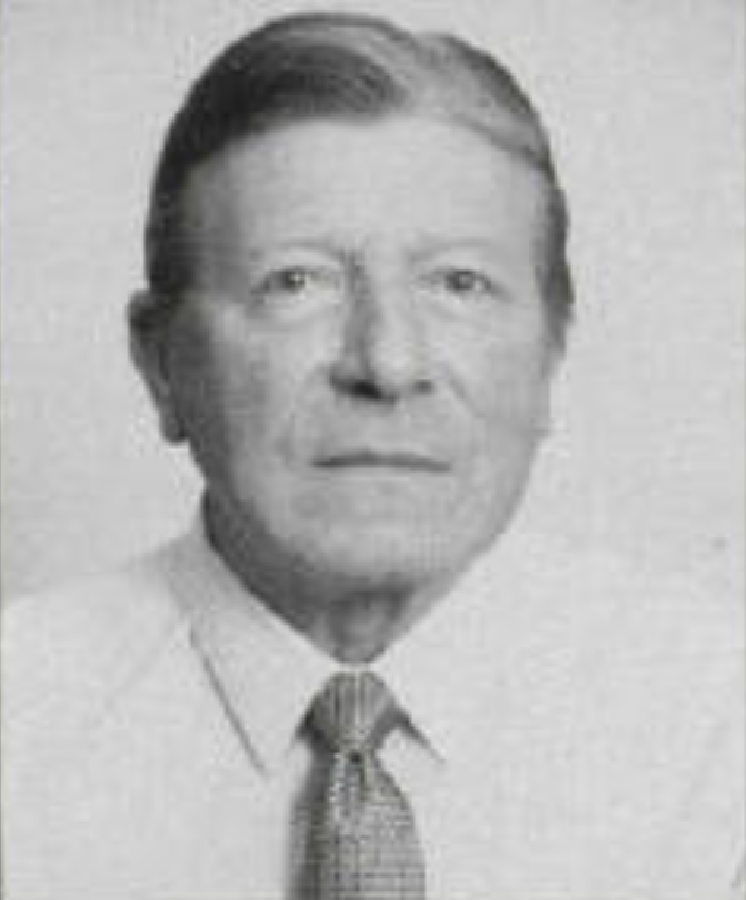
Ernest E. Alliott - Founder of Dover Court

The campus was established in April 1972 on Dover Road, in the former Officer's Mess of the Royal Corps of Signals and later the Mess of the 2nd-10th Princess Mary's Own Regiment, which was constructed by the British military in 1952. Following the British military withdrawal from Singapore in 1971, the land was repurposed and the former mess, a three-story block, was renovated into classrooms fit for 450 students, although the school started with just 25 students enrolled. The crest of the Royal Corps of Signals can still be seen in the primary school building, as it is one of the original buildings from the former military base.

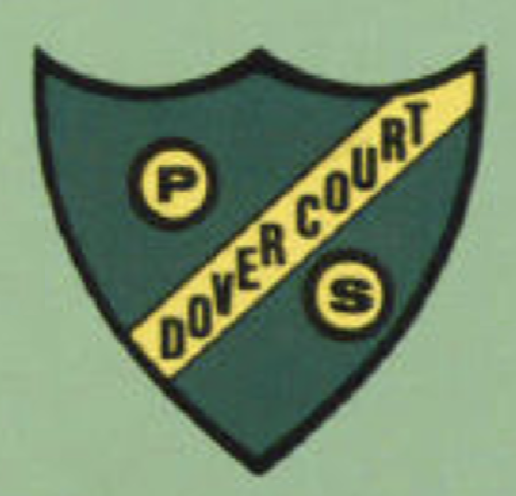
Crest of the former Dover Court Preparatory School, Singapore.

==== Ernest E. Alliott ====
Ernest E. Alliott came to Singapore in 1957 as an officer of the British Ministry of Defence education service. Until 1961 he was attached to the Royal Air Force schools in Changi and Seletar, before being transferred to the British Army schools division. From 1961 to 1975 he held the posts of Headmaster of the British Army School, Pulau Brani; the British Army School, Selarang; and the Alexandra School, Portsdown Road. After 1975, Alliott resigned from British government service to devote his full time to Dover Court, which he had established in 1972 - a project he had been able to undertake without conflict under the military Queen's Regulations as pertained at the time.

Alliott noted in a letter to parents and colleagues in 1989:

"The development and growth of land and buildings into a fine school is achieved only when the sum of its parts is viewed constantly as infinite. [...] My grateful thanks to all of you for your support and continued efforts to make Dover Court one of the finest schools of its kind in South East Asia".

In its early years, Dover Court Preparatory School was both a day and boarding school. The boarding house - the first of its kind in Singapore, operated by a boarding housemaster and housemistress, a matron and other staff, primarily accommodated students from ASEAN and neighbouring countries. Boarders took part in a wide variety of activities, including sports and excursions. Boarding, which continued until at least the early 1990s, was later discontinued.

Dover Court soon became one of the largest expatriate preparatory schools in Singapore. With the expatriate community in Singapore growing, Dover Court Preparatory School expanded in the 1980s to cope with the demand. With a growing number of students on its waiting list, a three-storey building, which now houses the secondary school and Department of Supportive Education, was built. This became known as the Ernest Alliott Foundation Block.

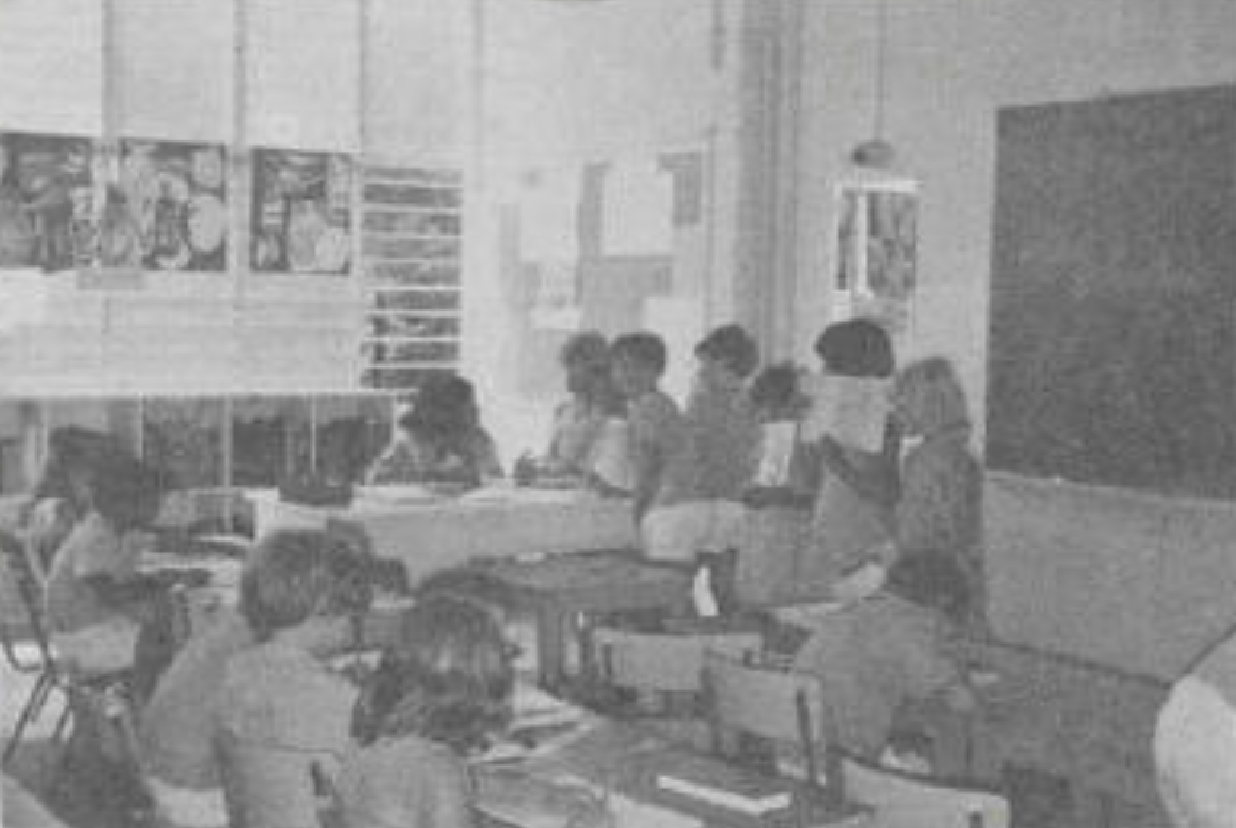
Students at Dover Court Preparatory School, Singapore (1977)

==== Department of Supportive Education ====
Under Maureen Roach, principal from the 1990 to 2015, the school underwent a restructuring and also developed its department for supportive education. In 2014, she was awarded the Order of the British Empire for her services to education in Singapore. The department is staffed by psychologists, speech therapists, physical therapists and teachers with qualifications in special needs. A great benefit of the department extolled by Alliott is the inclusivity and integration of students with disabilities into main-school activities at Dover Court. This is a view shared by former Prime Minister of Singapore Lee Kuan Yew, whose first grandson attended the school. He noted in an interview in 2009 that Dover Court Preparatory School pioneered the field of supportive education in Singapore, providing the resources and expertise that other schools did not offer at the time.

The school is still known in Singapore for its inclusive approach to learning and the Department of Supportive Education is extensive and well-regarded. On September 12, 2002, the school was visited by Her Royal Highness The Duchess of Gloucester. She took particular interest in the work of the Centre for Special Education. A plaque commemorating the visit is visible near to the main entrance to the school.

=== 21st Century ===
In April 2014, the school changed ownership from the Alliott family to Nord Anglia, becoming part of the Nord Anglia Education family of schools.

The school underwent an extensive refurbishment project during the 2014 summer period. In September 2014, the school changed its name from Dover Court Preparatory School to Dover Court International School, and in 2016, Christopher Short was appointed Principal. In recognition of the school's history, the tie worn by secondary boys at Dover Court still features the colours of Dover Court Preparatory School, with stripes of green and yellow.

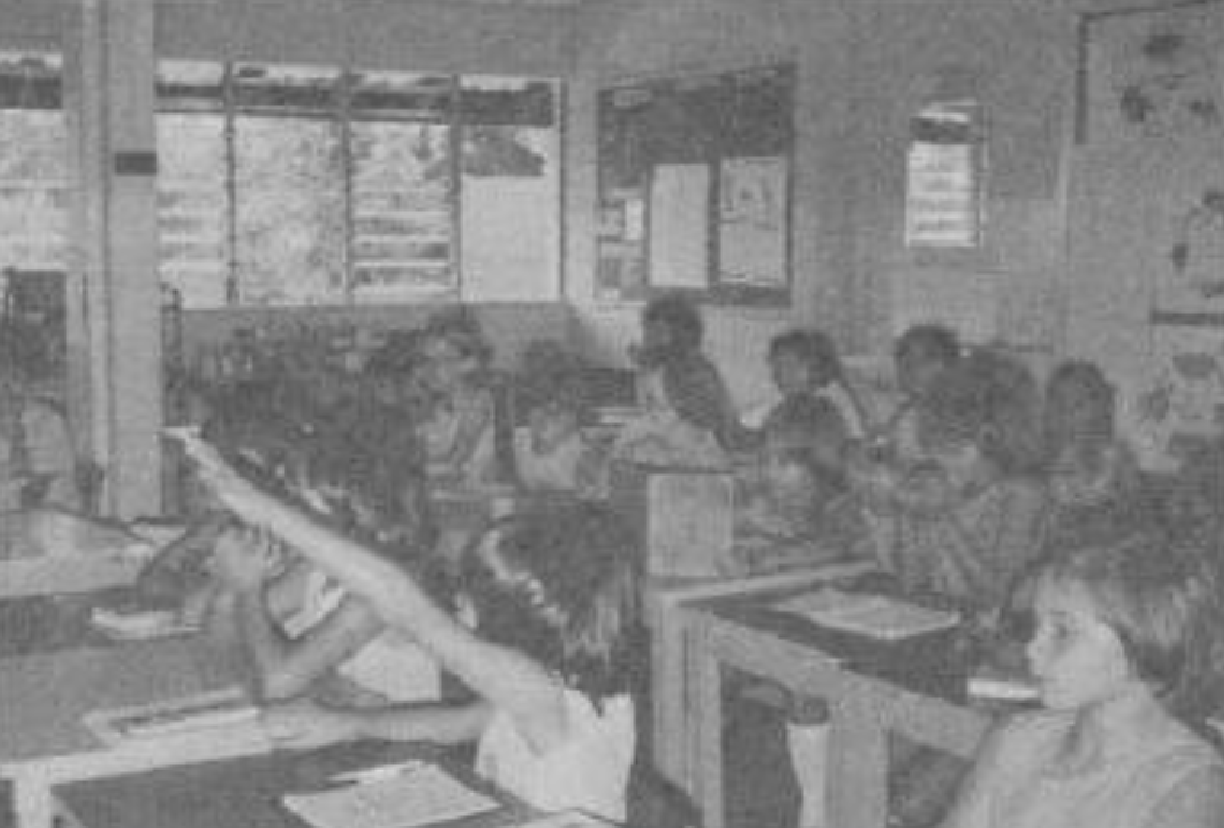
Students at Dover Court Preparatory School, Singapore (1977)

== Principals ==
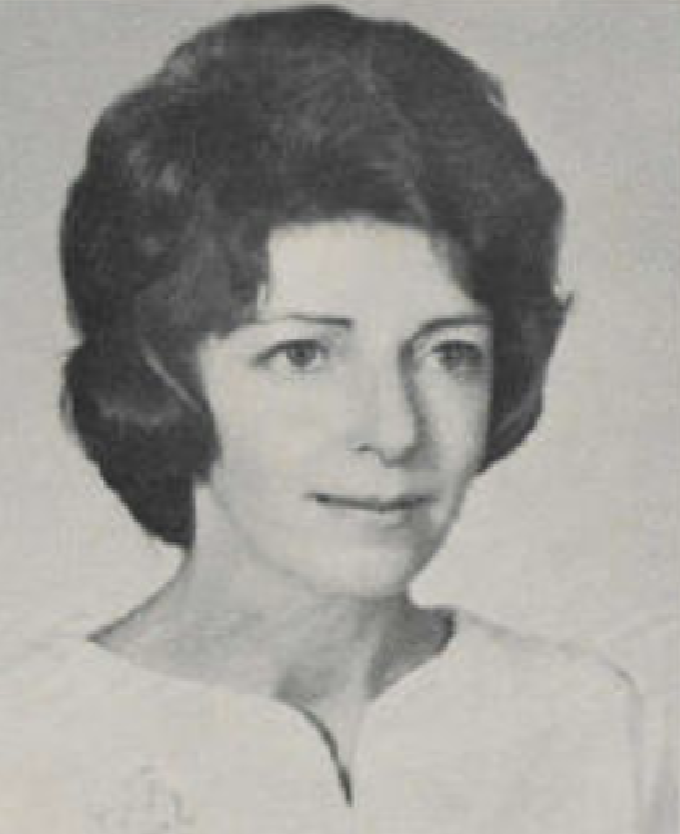
Catherine J. Hamilton - First Principal of Dover Court.

The following individuals have served as the principal of Dover Court since its establishment in 1972, with the founder Ernest Alliott serving as chairman from 1962 until 2006:

Ordinal	Principal	Term start	Term end	Term length
1	Catherine J. Hamilton	1972	1975	3 years
2	Eric Cooper	1975	1980	5 years
3	James Watkins	1981	1990	9 years
4	Maureen Roach OBE	1990	2015	25 years
5	Neil Hopkin FRSA	2015	2016	1 year
6	Christopher Short	2016	2020	4 years
7	Simon Mann	2020	2021	1 year
8	Richard Dyer	2021	2025	4 years
9	Christopher Short	2025	2026	1 year
10	Richard Vaughan	2026	Incumbent	

== Campus ==
Dover Court International School is located on Dover Road in Central Singapore. The school site, on a plot of 12 acres, is situated in the educational district of Dover, near several other educational institutions.

=== Initial developments ===
When the school first opened in 1972, there was only a three-story building on the site of the former military base, which later became the primary school building. Most of the school was housed there, with the exception of some infant classes, which were accommodated to the rear in prefabricated huts; and boarders, who were accommodated in an adjacent building. In the conversion of the barracks into Dover Court Preparatory School, rooms on the second and third levels, most of which had previously been soldiers' bedrooms, were converted into classrooms. The classroom on the ground floor was converted from what had previously been the officers' pub, although remnants of its previous function, notably a black padded bar counter, were not fully removed until 1980.

The Main Assembly Hall was established in the building, but was moved during later developments to accommodate the Music department. A fountain from the barracks was removed to make way for a roundabout and a carpark was later built on a steep, grassy slope at the entrance to the school to allow for students to be dropped off by parents. In the early hours of January 24, 1978, a fire gutted the quarters of the office manageress adjoining the main building. Nobody was hurt in the blaze and no damage occurred to nearby classrooms and offices.

=== Further developments ===
With the growth of the school body during the late 1970s, there was a need to expand the school's infrastructure that it had inherited from the British Armed Forces. Since the school was established on a large plot of land, with the main building surrounded by undeveloped field, there was significant space to do so. S$2.5 million was spent for the development of these buildings, with the intention of opening up another 240 places at the school. This decision was made in light of shortages of school places for expatriate children in the early 1980s, with the possibility left open for further expansion should there be the need.

The Administration block, the Cooper Hall and the Main Library were built between 1980 and 1981, followed by the Infant Block and Library between 1983 and 1984, and the Centre for Special Education between 1986 and 1987. Construction work continued into the 1990s, with the construction of the swimming pool complex in 1996 and refurbishment work. The Ernest Alliott Swimming Complex, as the pool complex was dedicated, was officially opened on 21 February 1998 in the presence of the school's founder. The Cooper Hall, where assemblies, concerts and other events are held, was named in memory of the late former principal of Dover Court, Eric Cooper, who died in 1980.

The campus underwent extensive refurbishment work following its change of ownership in 2014, with further refurbishment of the school's original infrastructure, and the development of new facilities - including the construction a running track, a grass football pitch, basketball and netball courts, a sensory garden, a radio and television recording studio, and several playgrounds. In August 2019, a new building for the secondary years was opened to further facilitate the school's expansion beyond preparatory education and into secondary and sixth form.

In 2022, a new block was opened, containing design technology labs, music, drama and music classrooms for secondary with a new dedicated P.E. building and a pathway 3 building.

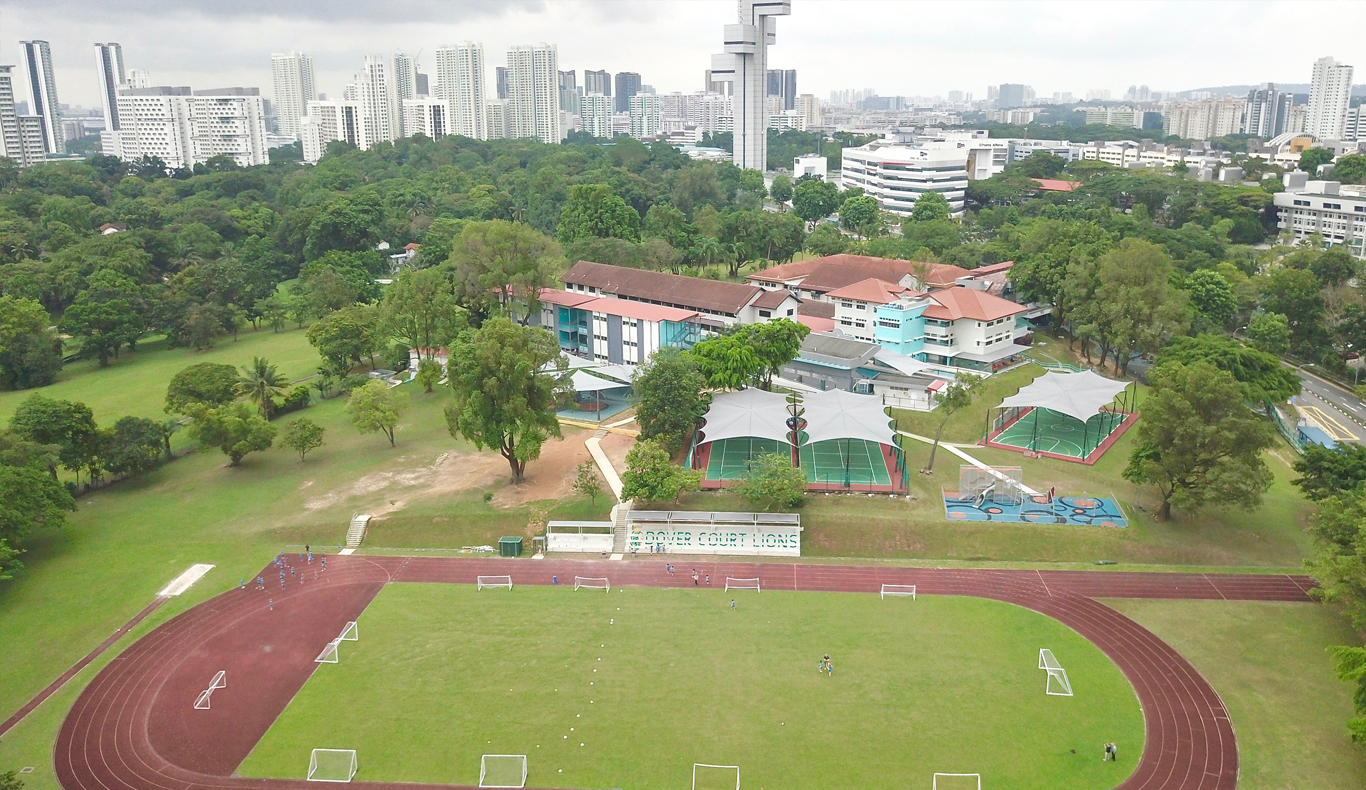
Aerial view of Dover Court International School, Singapore

== Curriculum ==
Dover Court International School teaches the English National Curriculum, adapted for an international setting. Nursery and Reception follow the Early Years Foundation Stage. Key Stage 1: Year 1 and 2, and Key Stage 2: Year 3, 4, 5 and 6 follow the English National Curriculum along with the International Primary Curriculum. Students in Years 9, 10 and 11 work towards the iGCSE and in the Sixth Form the International Baccalaureate and BTEC International Diploma Level 2 in Business are offered.

=== Languages ===
All Primary School students have mostly daily Mandarin lessons and in Secondary School the students are able to choose between French, Mandarin and Spanish.

== Extracurricular ==
=== Sport ===
Dover Court International School has several competitive sports teams: football, netball, basketball, rugby, touch rugby, swimming, cross country, athletics, indoor cricket and Gaelic football. DCIS is part of the Athletics Conference Singapore International Schools, ACSIS and participates also in international sports events through the Federation of British International Schools in Asia, FOBISIA.

=== The arts ===
Dover Court International School has an active music department with a school orchestra and several choirs, together with the drama department annual musicals are produced. In May 2018 a group of students won the Best Drama and Best Special Effects awards in the 2018 Across Asia Youth Film Festival (AAYFF) with the film "War Photographer". The film, "The Clutches of the Curtain", created by the same group of students, also won the Special Effects award at the 2019 Across Asia Youth Film Festival (AAYFF).

There are annual residential trips for all year groups from Year 3 and above, as well as opportunities to participate in expeditions to the Swiss Alps and Tanzania. Students also participate in the United Nations High Level Politician Forum in New York, a Global Orchestra for Nord Anglia students held at The Juilliard School and in annual STEAM workshops at MIT.

== Awards ==
Dover Court International School has achieved considerable success and recognition both nationally and internationally for education. In January 2018, the school was awarded the Outstanding Senior Leadership Team of the Year prize at The British International School Awards. In September 2018, teacher Monica Dolan was announced as the winner of the Future Leaders Category at the British Chamber of Commerce's 19th Annual Business Awards. Dover Court International School was also awarded the UK Impact in Singapore prize by the Chamber the following year. In October 2022, Dover Court was again awarded the UK Impact in Singapore prize at the Chamber's 23rd Annual Business Awards. The school was also awarded the Diversity and Inclusive Community at the HoneyKids Singapore Education Awards the same year.

== Traditions ==
=== United Nations Day ===
A key event on the Dover Court calendar is its annual United Nations Day - a celebration of the school's rich cultural diversity among students and staff. In its early years, United Nations Day was conducted in cooperation with Dover Court's then sister school, Singapore Preparatory School, Katong - also owned by International Schools (Pte) Ltd. While the day has taken on many forms over its almost half-a-century history, a constant fixture of the event is the 'Parade of Nations', in which students parade in front of parents, wearing their cultural dress. It was noted in an article about the 1984 Dover Court United Nations Day by the acting representative from the United Nations High Commission in Singapore that the students "represented the true spirit of the UN".

It was also described in an article in The Straits Times in 1982 by the then principal, James Watkins, of United Nations Day:

"The school is like a mini United Nations, with pupils from every possible creed, a multitude of habits, cultures, customs and eating habits have come together -- and all in complete harmony. Perhaps there's a lesson here for the politicians. If the UN could conduct itself as peacefully as the pupils in this school, wars will cease to exist".

=== Christmas Concert ===
Another tradition is the annual Dover Court Christmas carols concert, featuring performances by the school choir and orchestra. The programme follows the traditional Christmas Nine Readings and Carols service. Until 2015, this event was held at the St George's Garrison Church, although at times it was held at St Andrew's Cathedral or at the nearby St John's Church (present-day St John's-St Margaret's Church). The 1974 Dover Court Christmas concert also included the Band of the Gordon Highlanders, one year before the final withdrawal of the British military from Singapore in 1975. The carols concert is now held at the school's Cooper Hall.

=== School anthem ===
The Dover Court Anthem, in celebration of the school's diversity, is sung to the tune of Beethoven's Symphony No. 9, better known as "Ode to Joy". The song, officially the anthem of the former Dover Court Preparatory School, is not in regular use, but was last performed by students at the school's 45th Anniversary celebrations in 2017 and has not been replaced.

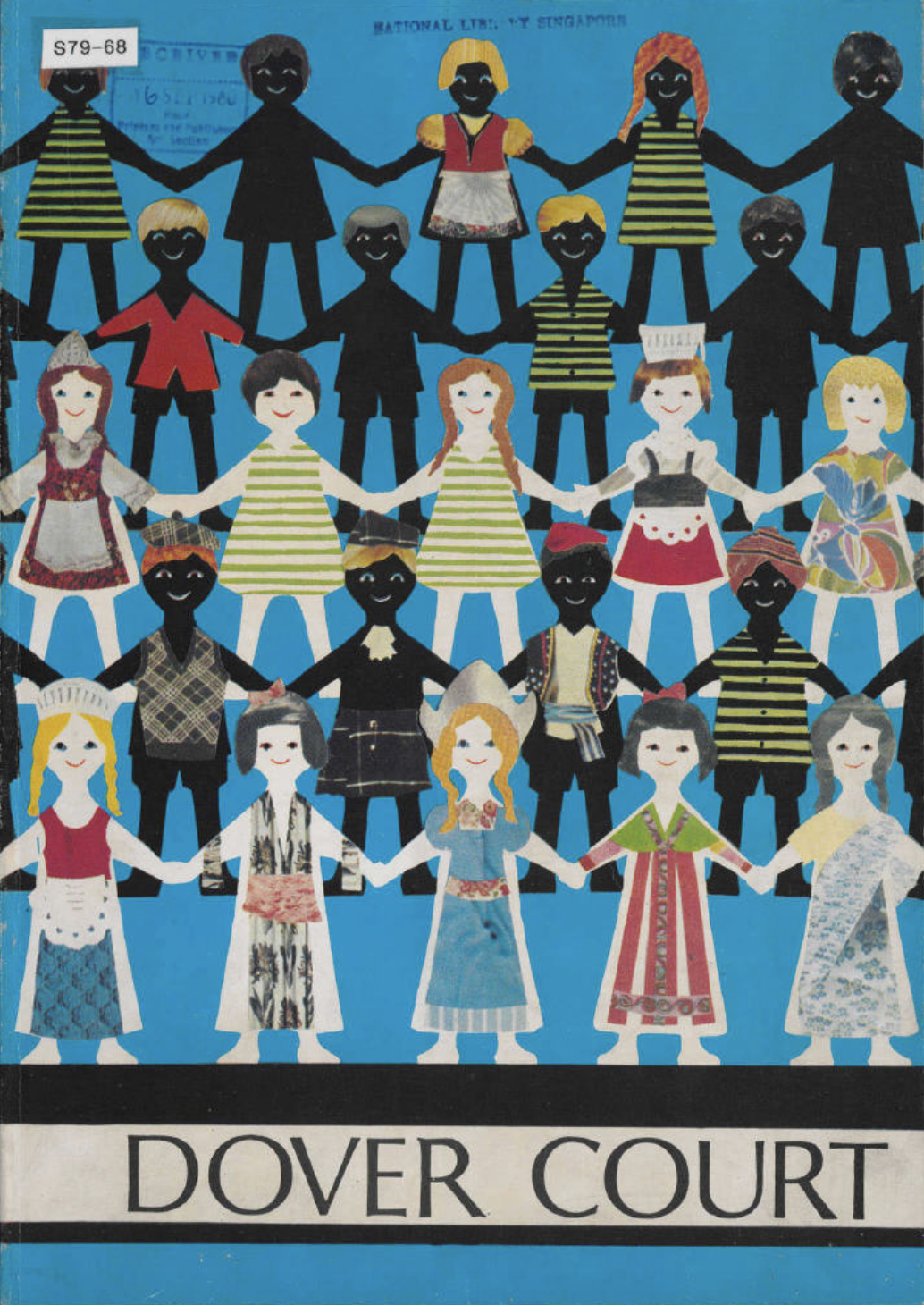
Cover of the Dover Court Preparatory School Yearbook (1974-75), with artwork depicting the school's diversity of cultures.

== Dover Court Association ==
The 'Dover Court Association' (DCA) was originally established as the 'Parent Teacher Friend Association' (PTFA) shortly after the founding of Dover Court Preparatory School in 1972 as a recognised society of parents. The name was changed to the 'Dover Court Association' following the school's change of ownership in 2014. It is involved in many activities of the school, including organising social events, fundraising and pastoral support. The Dover Court Association is volunteer-led and is a registered society, in line with the Societies Act and Regulations of Singapore. It is headed by a small executive committee comprising elected Chairs, Treasurer, Secretary and a wider committee of volunteers.

== Notable alumni ==
Alumni of Dover Court (both Dover Court International School and the former Dover Court Preparatory School) are known as Doverians.

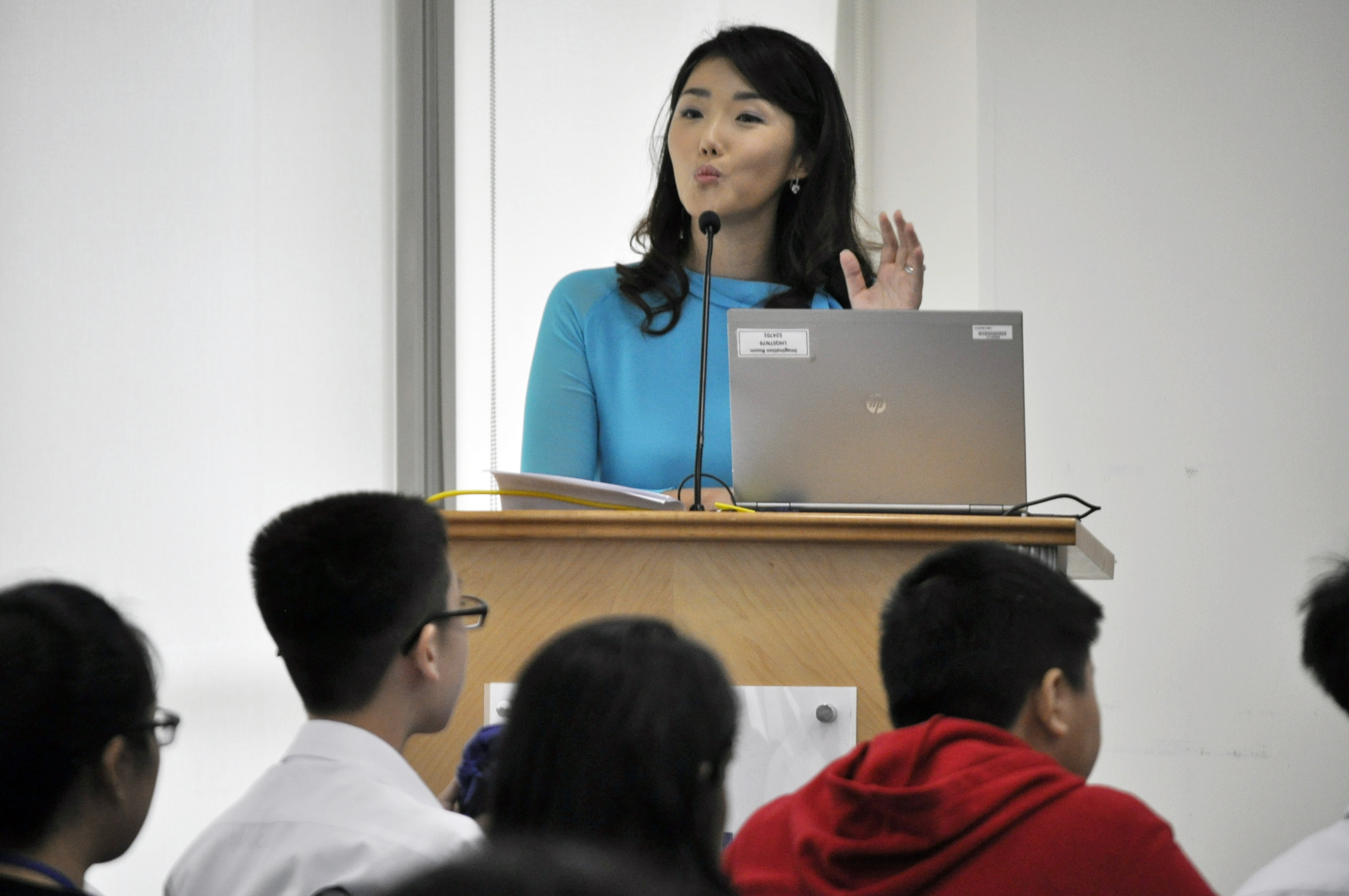
Suzanne Jung - Alumnus of Dover Court Preparatory School

- Suzanne Jung (former primetime news anchor, journalist and editor at Channel NewsAsia), honorary ambassador of the Ministry of Culture and Tourism of Korea.
