= Suzanne Jung =

Former primetime news anchor, journalist and editor

Suzanne Jung is a former primetime news anchor, journalist and editor at Channel NewsAsia. In 2018, she was appointed "honorary ambassador" by the South Korean Ministry of Culture, Sports and Tourism. Jung is a consultant for themediaconsultants.

== Career ==
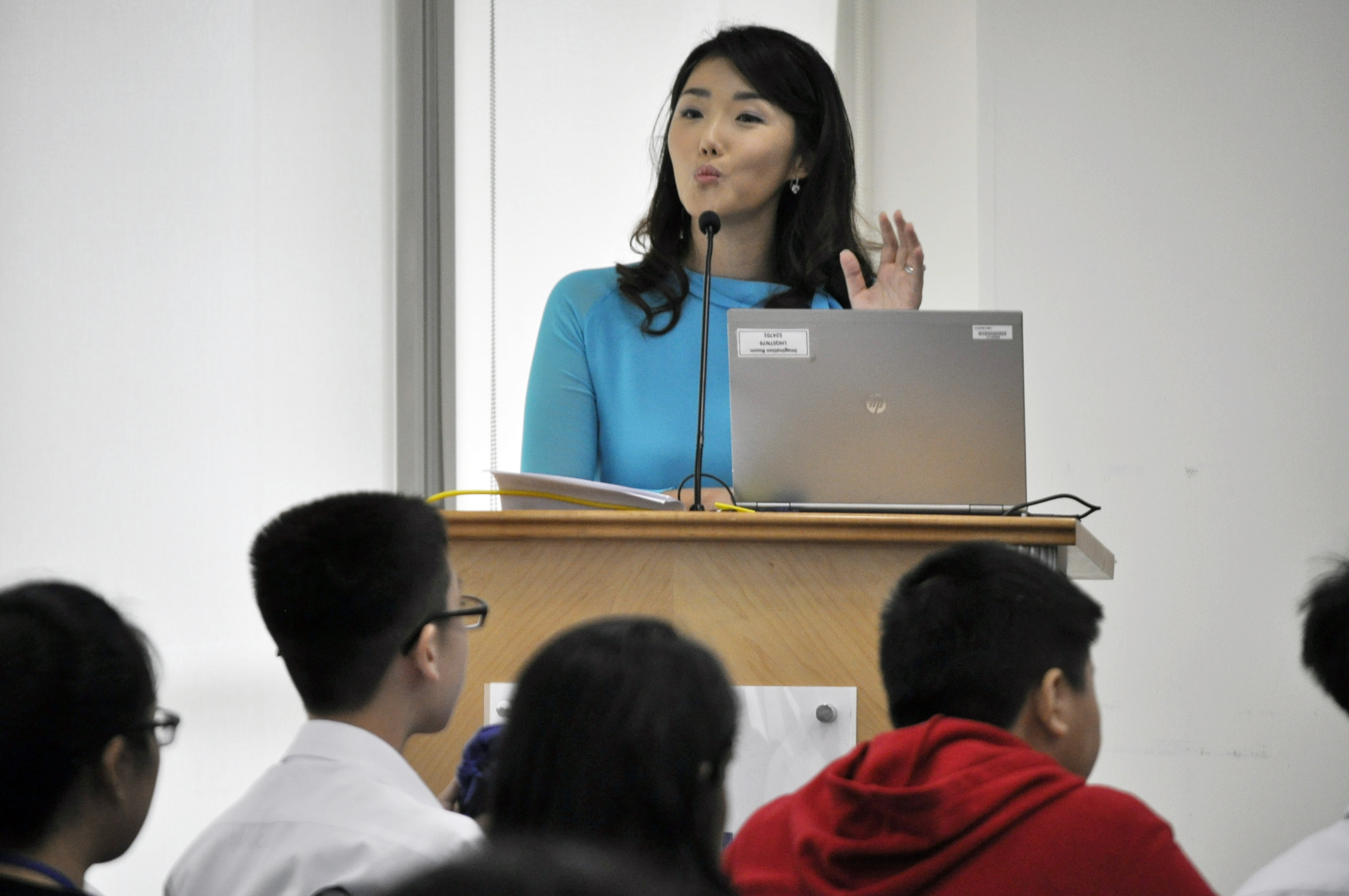
Suzanne Jung at the All In! Young Writers Festival in 2016.

Beginning in 2002, Suzanne Jung spent 14 years as a news anchor on the Singapore-based television network Channel NewsAsia. She co-anchored and produced for Channel NewsAsia’s flagship morning show, "AM LIVE!". Among the stories she covered were the 2003 Jakarta bombings and the 2004 Indian Ocean Tsunami. Suzanne received awards for a number of her reports including for her coverage on the IMF/World Bank meeting in 2006 and the 13th ASEAN Summit, which was hosted in Singapore in 2007. In 2011, she filmed a documentary on UN Secretary-General Ban Ki Moon and the world body which was a finalist for Best Documentary at the New York International award as well as at the Asian Television Awards.

== Personal life ==
Originally from South Korea, Jung arrived in Singapore with her family in 1983. She is married to Kwek Eik Sheng and they have two children.

== Education ==
Jung was educated at the then Dover Court Preparatory School, in Singapore. She studied journalism at Yonsei University, graduating in 2001.
