= Prawn roll =

Australian foodstuff

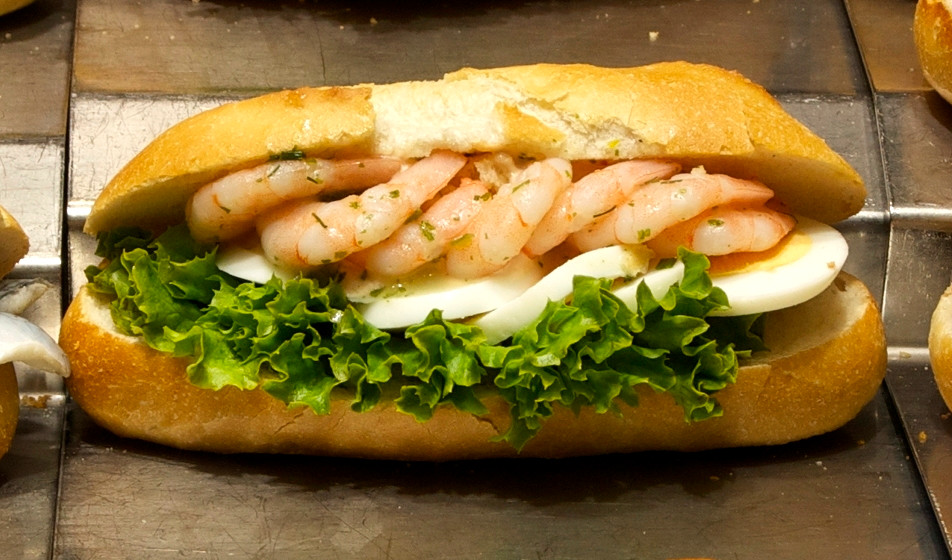
- A prawn roll with lettuce and hard-boiled egg
- Type: Sandwich
- Place of origin: Australia
- Main ingredients: White bread, prawns, lettuce

A prawn roll is a sandwich item available in areas of Australia, where prawn fishing is a major industry. They typically are made using a soft white roll, stuffed with a dozen or more peeled prawns, lettuce and remoulade, Thousand Island or cocktail-style sauce.

== See also ==
- List of sandwiches
- List of seafood dishes
- List of stuffed dishes
