= Choson Exchange =

Singapore-registered social enterprise

- Logo of Choson Exchange

Chinese name
- Traditional Chinese: 朝鮮交流
- Simplified Chinese: 朝鲜交流
Transcriptions
Standard Mandarin
- Hanyu Pinyin: Cháoxiǎn Jiāoliú

Korean name
- Hangul: 조선교류
- Hanja: 朝鮮交流
Transcriptions
- Revised Romanization: Joseon Gyoryu
- McCune–Reischauer: Chosŏn Kyoryu

Choson Exchange is a Singapore-registered social enterprise focusing on economic policy, business and legal training for young North Koreans. Choson Exchange brings foreign volunteers to teach entrepreneurship, business, marketing, law or economics, after which the volunteers tour relevant sites in North Korea. They also sponsor North Koreans to go overseas for exposure and learning. Programs include economic policy, entrepreneurship and financial sector development.

The organization brought over 100 foreign volunteers to train over 2000 North Koreans by 2018, brought over 100 Koreans to Singapore, Vietnam and Malaysia for exposure and learning. Choson Exchange is the largest business network in North Korea and the most active organization training Koreans in economic areas. It has been profiled as a Harvard Business School case study and was cited by futurist Parag Khanna's book Connectography as "the most prominent international nongovernmental organization operating in North Korea". Some notable volunteers at programs include George Yeo, former Minister of Foreign Affairs, Trade & Industry, and Information, Communications and the Arts for Singapore.

== Background ==
Choson Exchange was founded by Geoffrey See, who began negotiations over educational exchange with North Koreans in 2007. The organization focuses on providing “training and advisory in topics related to business, economics, finance and law” in North Korea.

== Current projects ==
Choson Exchange brings volunteers to train DPR Koreans in Pyongyang, Pyongsong, Wonsan and Rason in economics, entrepreneurship and business and also conducts training programs overseas to provide Koreans with greater exposure to the world. Workshop leaders volunteer in their private capacity, and previous trainings have featured the ex-Finance Minister of Singapore, ex-Chairman of Singapore International Airlines, bankers from Goldman Sachs and Bank of America Merrill Lynch as well as big-four consultancies, major tech companies and startups. Choson Exchange workshop fall into two main tracks, one focused on business and management skills, the other on broader economic management issues. Major programs in these fields include the Women in Business program, aimed at supporting female entrepreneurs and managers and the Provincial Development Program, focused on the governance of DPRK Special Economic Zones. The organization also supports young North Koreans with internships and scholarships for longer, master's-level study programs.

Choson Exchange compiles and distributes economic and business materials in various formats for audiences in North Korea. The non-profit is also working on establishing an incubator in North Korea. The founder is a member of the Kauffman Fellows Program, a leadership program for venture capitalists and those involved in building out entrepreneurial ecosystems.

== 2018 North Korea–United States summit ==
In 2018, the Washington Post cited Choson Exchange's work bringing North Koreans to Singapore as one among a number of reasons why Singapore was chosen as the site of the 2018 North Korea–United States summit between the leaders of the United States and DPRK, Donald Trump and Kim Jong Un. The Washington Post also noted that Kim Jong Un's tour around Singapore's Marina Bay, during which he praised Singapore's development, was exactly the same route in which more than 100 of Choson Exchange's North Korean participants had taken in the past when they visit Singapore.

== Singapore-South Korea relations ==
In 2018, Seoul Mayor Park Won-soon visited Singapore and expressed appreciation for Choson Exchange's work introducing economic policy, business and entrepreneurship to DPR Koreans. After the meeting, Mayor Park told South Korean media that Seoul should initiate startup exchanges with North Korea, with the work of Choson Exchange as a reference for what is possible and should be done. Later that year, Choson Exchange was represented at the State Dinner between President Halimah Yacob and President Moon Jae-in during a state visit to Singapore.

== Research and outreach ==
Choson Exchange studies and reports on changes in North Korea's economic policy and investment laws for an international audience. Choson Exchange staff also provide analysis on political or social events, particularly as they relate to the economic life of the DPRK.

The organization is also regularly cited by international news organizations on political and economic developments in North Korea, having appeared in The New York Times, The Washington Post, the Guardian, The Economist, Reuters, the Associated Press, China Daily and others.
