= Li Xiting =

China-born Singaporean billionaire entrepreneur

- 李西廷
- Born: 1951 (age 73–74); Dangshan County, Anhui, China
- Citizenship: Singapore (2018–present); China (1951–2018)
- Education: University of Science and Technology of China (BS)
- Occupation: Businessman
- Years active: 1991–present
- Title: Co-founder and president of Mindray

Li Xiting (Chinese: 李西廷; pinyin: Lǐ Xītíng; born 1951) is a Chinese-born Singaporean billionaire business magnate. He is the co-founder, president of Mindray, China's largest medical equipment manufacturer.

== Early life ==
Li was born in a rural village of his family name in Dangshan County in Anhui, China in 1951.

Li graduated from the University of Science and Technology of China with a bachelor's degree in low temperature physics.

== Career ==
Between 1976 and 1987, Li worked as a researcher assisting scholars at institutes in Wuhan, Hubei and France, where he was a visiting scholar at Paris-Sud University in the early 1980s.

Li's first attempt at entrepreneurship was at Shenzhen Anke High-tech Company in Shenzhen, Guangdong, a partially state-owned enterprise set up by the Chinese Academy of Sciences (CAS) in the 1980s. The company would arguably become China's very first home-grown developer of medical devices, and launched the nation's first magnetic resonance imaging (MRI) scanner in 1989.

Li founded medical equipment manufacturer Mindray in Shenzhen 1991 with Xu Hang and Cheng Minghe (成明和).

Li secured Mindray's first contract, a 360,000-yuan sale, at a medical equipment convention in the 1990s.

Mindray listed on the New York Stock Exchange in 2006, raising US$270 million.

In 2016, Li and the other two co-founders of Mindray took the company private in US$1.9 billion deal.

Li moved to Singapore, and became a naturalised citizen in 2018.

During the COVID-19 pandemic, it was estimated that Li's net worth was increasing by US$1 billion every month as Mindray's stock price increased due to high demand for ventilators.

In April 2021, Forbes estimated Li's net worth to be US$21.5 billion, making him the richest man in Singapore.
