= Ron Sim =

Singaporean business magnate and investor (born 1958)

Ron Sim Chye Hock (Chinese: 沈財福, born 1958) is a Singaporean business magnate and investor. He is the founder of Osim International. In 2013, he ranked twenty-first on Forbes' 2013 list of the fifty richest Singaporeans, with an estimated net worth of US$1.4 billion.

== Early life ==
Ron Sim Chye Hock was born in 1958 in Singapore. As a child, he sold noodles for a living.

== Business career ==
Sim established the electrical and household appliance company Osim International in 1979. After close to a decade, Osim branched out its operations into Hong Kong, and subsequently the Republic of China.

Sim also owns the China-based Richlife, GNC in Southeast Asia, and the United States-based Brookstone. In 2012, he was listed as thirty-third on Forbes' "Singapore's 50 Richest" list. The following year, he rose to twenty-first. His estimated net worth increased to a billion dollars, mostly due to Osim's shares rapidly soaring.

== Other ventures ==
Sim is an advisory board member of the Lee Kong Chian School of Business in Singapore. He has also been a Committee member of the Nanyang Technological University Enterprise Committee, a board member of both International Enterprise Singapore and Sentosa Development Corporation, and a trustee board member of the Tan Tock Seng Hospital Community Charity Fund.

== Awards and recognition ==
In 2004, Sim was the recipient of the "Entrepreneur of The Year" award by Ernst & Young. The same year, The Business Times presented him its "Businessman of the Year" award.

== Personal life ==
Sim is married with three children and resides in Singapore.
