= Goh Cheng Liang =

Singaporean businessman (1927–2025)

- Born: 1927; Singapore, Straits Settlements, British Malaya
- Died: 12 August 2025 (aged 98); Singapore
- Occupation: Businessman
- Known for: Founder, Wuthelam Holdings
- Spouse: Married
- Children: 3, including Goh Hup Jin

Chinese name
- Traditional Chinese: 吳清亮
- Simplified Chinese: 吴清亮
- Hanyu Pinyin: Wú Qīngliàng

Goh Cheng Liang (1927 – 12 August 2025) was a Singaporean billionaire businessman who founded Wuthelam Holdings, which manufactures paint and coatings.

== Early life ==
Goh Cheng Liang was born in Singapore. He is the son of Wu Songchang and Li Xiuying.

He grew up in poverty and sold fishnets and rubber tapper for income. After World War II, he began buying cheap paint from the British army which he turned into a local company.

== Career ==
Goh set up his first paint shop in Singapore in 1955, and became the main distributor there for Nippon Paint in 1962. Wuthelam Holdings, which has interests in the paint business and property development, was founded in 1974 as a real estate concern.

In 2020, his son Goh Hup Jin helped conclude a deal which enabled Wuthelam Holdings to formally take control of Nippon Paint. The merger added approximately $3.8 billion to his overall net worth. According to Forbes, his net worth stood at $12.7 billion as of 2024, making him the second richest person in Singapore.

== Personal life and death ==
Goh Cheng Liang lived in Singapore. His Goh Foundation has made large donations to several charitable causes.

He had a son, Goh Hup Jin, who has been the chairman of Nippon Paint since March 2018 and runs their privately held joint venture, Nipsea.

Goh died on 12 August 2025, at the age of 98.
