= List of Africans by net worth =

The Richest Africans is an annual ranking of the richest African people, compiled and published by the American business magazine Forbes. In 2025, there was a record of 22 African billionaires on the list. Billionaires who are from Africa, but do not reside in the continent (such as Elon Musk, Patrick Drahi, Patrick Soon-Shiong, Nathan Kirsh, Mohammed Al Amoudi, Adebayo Ogunlesi, Ivan Glasenberg, Clive Calder, Mo Ibrahim, Tope Awotona) are excluded from the list by Forbes.

== Annual rankings ==
=== 2025 ===
As of 2025, Nigerian billionaire Aliko Dangote is the richest person in Africa, and the African countries with the most billionaires are South Africa (7), Egypt (5), Nigeria (4), and Morocco (3). Algeria, Tanzania and Zimbabwe each have one billionaire.

| No. | Name | Net worth (USD) | Nationality | Source(s) of wealth |
|---|---|---|---|---|
| 1 | Aliko Dangote | $30.3B | Nigeria | Manufacturing |
| 2 | Johann Rupert | $19.4B | South Africa | Fashion & Retail |
| 3 | Nicky Oppenheimer | $13.6B | South Africa | Metals & Mining |
| 4 | Abdul Samad Rabiu | $10.2B | Nigeria | Food & Beverages , BUA Cement |
| 4 | Naguib Sawiris | $10.2B | Egypt | Telecommunications & Engineering |
| 6 | Nassef Sawiris | $9.74B | Egypt | Construction , agro-chemicals |
| 7 | Mike Adenuga | $6.8B | Nigeria | Telecommunications , Conoil |
| 8 | Koos Bekker | $3.8B | South Africa | Media & Entertainment |
| 9 | Patrice Motsepe | $3.5B | South Africa | Metals & Mining |
| 10 | Mohamed Mansour | $3.4B | Egypt | Mansour Group |
| 11 | Issad Rebrab | $3B | Algeria | Food & Beverages |
| 11 | Michiel le Roux | $3B | South Africa | Finance |
| 13 | Mohammed Dewji | $2.2B | Tanzania | MeTL Group |
| 13 | Jannie Mouton | $2.2B | South Africa | Finance & Investments |
| 15 | Othman Benjelloun | $2.0B | Morocco | Finance |
| 16 | Christoffel Wiese | $1.8B | South Africa | Fashion & Retail |
| 17 | Aziz Akhannouch | $1.6B | Morocco | Akwa Group |
| 17 | Anas Sefrioui | $1.6B | Morocco | Real Estate |
| 17 | Femi Otedola | $1.6B | Nigeria | Energy |
| 20 | Youssef Mansour | $1.4B | Egypt | Mansour Group |
| 21 | Strive Masiyiwa | $1.3B | Zimbabwe | Telecommunications & Engineering |
| 22 | Yasseen Mansour | $1.2B | Egypt | Mansour Group |

=== 2024 ===
As of December 2024, South African billionaire Johann Rupert is the richest person in Africa, and the African countries with the most billionaires are South Africa (7), Egypt (5), Nigeria (4), and Morocco (2). Algeria, Tanzania and Zimbabwe each have one billionaire.

| No. | Name | Net worth (USD) | Nationality | Source(s) of wealth |
|---|---|---|---|---|
| 1 | Johann Rupert | $14.5B | South Africa | Fashion & Retail |
| 2 | Aliko Dangote | $13.9B | Nigeria | Manufacturing |
| 3 | Nicky Oppenheimer | $11.5B | South Africa | Metals & Mining |
| 4 | Nassef Sawiris | $9.6B | Egypt | Construction & Engineering |
| 5 | Naguib Sawiris | $7.55B | Egypt | Telecommunications & Engineering |
| 6 | Mike Adenuga | $6.9B | Nigeria | Glo (company) |
| 7 | Abdul Samad Rabiu | $5.9B | Nigeria | Food & Beverages , BUA Cement |
| 8 | Mohamed Mansour | $3.3B | Egypt | Mansour Group |
| 9 | Patrice Motsepe | $3.2B | South Africa | Metals & Mining |
| 9 | Koos Bekker | $3.2B | South Africa | Media & Entertainment |
| 11 | Strive Masiyiwa | $3.1B | Zimbabwe | Telecommunications & Engineering |
| 12 | Issad Rebrab | $2.7B | Algeria | Food & Beverages |
| 13 | Michiel le Roux | $1.9B | South Africa | Finance |
| 14 | Mohammed Dewji | $1.8B | Tanzania | MeTL Group |
| 15 | Aziz Akhannouch | $1.7B | Morocco | Akwa Group |
| 16 | Christoffel Wiese | $1.6B | South Africa | Fashion & Retail |
| 16 | Othman Benjelloun | $1.6B | Morocco | Finance |
| 18 | Femi Otedola | $1.5B | Nigeria | Energy |
| 19 | Youssef Mansour | $1.3B | Egypt | Mansour Group |
| 20 | Yasseen Mansour | $1.2B | Egypt | Mansour Group |

=== 2023 ===
As of 2023, Nigerian billionaire Aliko Dangote is the richest person in Africa, and the African countries with the most billionaires are Egypt (5), South Africa (6), Nigeria (3), and Morocco (2)

| No. | Name | Net worth (USD) | Nationality | Source(s) of wealth |
|---|---|---|---|---|
| 1 | Aliko Dangote | $13.5B | Nigeria | Dangote Cement |
| 2 | Johann Rupert | $10.7B | South Africa | Richemont |
| 3 | Nicky Oppenheimer | $8.4B | South Africa | De Beers |
| 4 | Abdul Samad Rabiu | $7.6B | Nigeria | BUA Group |
| 5 | Nassef Sawiris | $7.3B | Egypt | Orascom |
| 6 | Mike Adenuga | $6.3B | Nigeria | Glo (company) |
| 7 | Issad Rebrab | $4.6B | Algeria | Cevital |
| 8 | Naguib Sawiris | $3.3B | Egypt | Orascom |
| 9 | Patrice Motsepe | $3.2B | South Africa | African Rainbow Minerals |
| 10 | Mohamed Mansour | $2.9B | Egypt | Mansour Group |
| 11 | Koos Bekker | $2.6B | South Africa | Naspers |
| 12 | Strive Masiyiwa | $1.9B | Zimbabwe | Econet Global |
| 13 | Aziz Akhannouch | $1.5B | Morocco | Akwa Group |
| 13 | Mohammed Dewji | $1.5B | Tanzania | MeTL Group |
| 13 | Youssef Mansour | $1.5B | Egypt | Mansour Group |
| 16 | Othman Benjelloun | $1.3B | Morocco | Bank of Africa Group |
| 17 | Michiel Le Roux | $1.2B | South Africa | Capitec Bank |
| 18 | Yasseen Mansour | $1.1B | Egypt | Mansour Group |
| 18 | Christoffel Wiese | $1.1B | South Africa | Pepkor |

=== 2021 ===
As of 2021, Nigerian billionaire Aliko Dangote is the richest person in Africa, and the African countries with the most billionaires are Egypt (5), South Africa (5), Nigeria (3), and Morocco (2).

| No. | Name | Net worth (USD) | Age | Nationality | Source(s) of wealth |
|---|---|---|---|---|---|
| 1 | Aliko Dangote | $14 billion ▲ | 63 | Nigeria | Dangote Group |
| 2 | Nassef Sawiris | $8.5 billion ▲ | 59 | Egypt | Orascom |
| 3 | Nicky Oppenheimer | $8.0 billion ▲ | 75 | South Africa | De Beers |
| 4 ▲ | Johann Rupert | $7.2 billion ▲ | 70 | South Africa | Richemont, Remgro |
| 4 ▼ | Mike Adenuga | $6.3 billion ▼ | 67 | Nigeria | Globacom, Conoil |
| 6 | Abdul Samad Rabiu | $5.5 billion ▲ | 60 | Nigeria | BUA Group |
| 7 ▼ | Issad Rebrab | $4.4 billion ▼ | 77 | Algeria | Cevital |
| 9 ▲ | Naguib Sawiris | $3.2 billion ▲ | 66 | Egypt | Orascom |
| 9 | Patrice Motsepe | $3.0 billion ▲ | 58 | South Africa | African Rainbow Minerals |
| 10 | Koos Bekker | $2.8 billion ▲ | 68 | South Africa | Naspers |
| 11 ▼ | Mohamed Mansour | $2.5 billion ▼ | 72 | Egypt | Mansour Group |
| 12 ▼ | Aziz Akhannouch | $2.0 billion ▼ | 60 | Morocco | Akwa Group |
| 13 ▲ | Mohammed Dewji | $1.6 billion | 45 | Tanzania | MeTL Group |
| 14 | Youssef Mansour | $1.4 billion ▲ | 75 | Egypt | Mansour Group |
| 15 ▼ | Othman Benjelloun | $1.3 billion ▼ | 88 | Morocco | Bank of Africa |
| 16 | Michiel Le Roux | $1.2 billion ▼ | 71 | South Africa | Capitec Bank |
| 16 ▲ | Strive Masiyiwa | $1.2 billion ▼ | 59 | Zimbabwe | Econet Global |
| 18 ▼ | Yasseen Mansour | $1.1 billion ▼ | 59 | Egypt | Mansour Group |

=== 2019 ===
The 2020 billionaires' list was released by Forbes on 14 January 2020. Also, the Forbes provides daily net worth updates which reflects change by 5 PM ET of prior trading day.

| No. | Name | Age (in 2019) | Nationality | Net worth (USD) | Source(s) of wealth |
|---|---|---|---|---|---|
| 1 | Aliko Dangote | 63 | Nigeria | $ 8.3 billion | Dangote Group |
| 2 | Oppenheimer family | 74 | South Africa | $ 7.4 billion | De Beers |
| 3 | Onsi Sawiris | 59 | Egypt | $ 7.3 billion | Orascom |
| 4 | Mike Adenuga | 67 | Nigeria | $ 6.2 billion | Globacom, Conoil |
| 5 | Rupert Familly | 69 | South Africa | $ 5.4 billion | Richemont, Remgro |
| 6 | Rebrab family | 76 | Algeria | $ 3.9 billion | Cevital |
| 7 | Mohamed Mansour | 72 | Egypt | $ 3.3 billion | Mansour Group |
| 8 | Abdul Samad Rabiu | 59 | Nigeria | $ 3.2 billion | BUA Group |
| 9 | | 65 | Egypt | $ 3 billion | Orascom |
| 10 | Sheikh Mohammed Hussein Al Amoudi | 72 | Ethiopia | $ 2.9 billion | Midroc |

== See also ==
- Lists of billionaires
- List of countries by the number of billionaires
