= Lists of people by net worth =

This is a list of people by net worth.

== Global ==
- The World's (Forbes)
- Bloomberg Billionaires Index

== National ==
- List of Argentines by net worth
- List of Americans by net worth
  - Forbes 400
  - List of richest Americans in history
- List of Australians by net worth
  - Financial Review Rich List
- List of Austrians by net worth
- List of Belgians by net worth
- List of Brazilians by net worth
- List of British billionaires by net worth
- List of Canadians by net worth
- List of Chinese by net worth
- List of Colombian people by net worth
- List of Cypriots by net worth
- List of Czechs by net worth
- List of Danes by net worth
- List of Dutch by net worth
- List of Egyptians by net worth
- List of Emiratis by net worth
- List of Finns by net worth
- List of French people by net worth
- List of Germans by net worth
- List of Greeks by net worth
- List of Hong Kong people by net worth
- List of Indian people by net worth
- List of Indonesians by net worth
- List of Irish people by net worth
- List of Israelis by net worth
- List of Italians by net worth
- List of Japanese by net worth
- List of Kazakhs by net worth
- List of Kenyans by net worth
- List of Lebanese by net worth
- List of Lithuanians by net worth
- List of Malaysians by net worth
- List of Mexicans by net worth
- List of Monegasques by net worth
- List of Moroccan people by net worth
- List of New Zealanders by net worth
- List of Nigerian billionaires by net worth
- List of Norwegians by net worth
- List of Pakistanis by net worth
- List of Peruvians by net worth
- List of Poles by net worth
- List of Portuguese by net worth
- List of Russians by net worth
- List of Saudis by net worth
- List of Singaporeans by net worth
- List of South Africans by net worth
- List of South Koreans by net worth
- List of Spaniards by net worth
- List of Swedes by net worth
- List of Swiss billionaires by net worth
- List of Taiwanese people by net worth
- List of Thais by net worth
- List of Turkish people by net worth
- List of Ukrainians by net worth
- List of Venezuelans by net worth

== Regional ==
- List of Africans by net worth
- List of Arabs by net worth
- List of Europeans by net worth
- List of Latin Americans by net worth
- List of South Asian people by net worth
- List of Southeast Asian people by net worth

== Miscellaneous ==
- Black billionaires
- List of countries by number of billionaires
- List of female billionaires
- List of royalty by net worth
- List of wealthiest families
- List of celebrities by net worth
- List of music artists by net worth

== See also ==
- Overclass
- Ultra high-net-worth individual
