= Ahmed El Maghrabi =

Egyptian businessman and former housing minister

Ahmed Alaeldin Amin Abdelmaksoud El Maghrabi (Arabic: أحمد علاء الدين أمين عبد المقصود المغربي; born 16 May 1945 in Cairo) is an Egyptian-Saudi businessman and former housing minister with the National Democratic Party.

El-Maghraby holds a degree in Engineering from Cairo University and another in Chemical Engineering from North Carolina University as well as an MBA from Columbia University.

== Business ventures ==
This branch of the Maghrabi family (brothers Ahmed and Sherif, and cousin Mohamed Akef Amin Abdelmaksoud El Maghrabi) is a 40:60 partner with the Mansour family (cousins Yasseen Mansour, Mohamed Mansour, and Youssef Mansour) in the Mansour & Maghrabi Investment Development (MMID) which owns a majority stake in the large EGX listed real estate developer Palm Hills Development Company PHDC.CA.

The family's El Maghrabi Group was also partner with the Accor hotel group establishing Accor Hotels S.A.E. (Accor Egypt) in 1994 as a joint stock venture specialized in hotels management and tourist development. Ahmed El-Maghraby was the CEO of Accor Egypt, while brother Sherif was chairman of the board of Guezira Hotels & Tourism, an Accor Egypt subsidiary, until 2011.

== Political career ==
El-Maghrabi became tourism Minister from 2004 with the first Ahmed Nazif cabinet that included a raft of young, free-market businessmen or so-called 'technocrats'. However, they were far from politically neutral as the group of businessmen were not just members of president Hosni Mubarak's National Democratic Party, they were part of its influential Policies Committee headed by his son, and president in waiting, Gamal. While the cabinet was hailed by liberal groups, it was criticized by others who raised suspicions about conflict of interest between their businesses and the ministers' positions as civil servants, a position the regime chose to ignore.

After Hosni Mubarak was sworn in for his sixth term as president, a reshuffle in December 2005 saw El Maghrabi appointed as Minister of Housing even though he had no experience in that sector. There he oversaw the Mubarak National Housing Project, that was criticised for providing inadequate homes, being unaffordable and riddled with corruption in the way housing units were allocated. El Maghrabi also made many land deals with fellow businessmen as chairman of the government developer, the New Urban Communities Authority (NUCA), deals which would prove controversial both during, and after his term in how and to whom the land was allocated.

The neoliberal policies of the Nazif cabinet, which was controlled by Mubarak's son, Gamal, in his bid for succession, is widely seen to have precipitated the 2011 Egyptian Revolution, that rose against widespread inequity and corruption, ending El Maghrabi's term as housing minister and career in politics.

== Corruption charges ==
In early February 2011, the uprising led to an investigation into El Maghrabi's conflict of interest as both chairman of NUCA (as Minister of Housing), and majority shareholder in Palm Hills which was allocated a number of large land plots by direct transfer at low prices without bidding in what was seen as a "notorious example of the land grabbing". Cousin Yaseen Mansour, major shareholder and chairman of Palm Hills, which was founded in 2005 (the same year El Maghrabi became housing minister) and was the second largest real estate developer by 2011, also faced charges of profiteering, ostensibly debuting on Forbes billionaires list that year with a fortune of $1.8 billion.

El Maghrabi's charges included profiteering, misappropriation of public funds and seizing state land and were part of a series of trials following the Egyptian revolution and held in Tora Prison. He was cleared of corruption charges in 2012 (overturning an earlier verdict) and 2013, but remained in custody due to additional charges. His 2013 acquittal was appealed by the prosecution, but upheld in 2015. Rights groups criticised the judicial process as being rigged in the Mubarak regime's favour, calling out how his group of ministers was tried according to laws they made and evidence that was gathered by audit agencies that they had controlled. While no investigations were made into Swiss bank accounts under his wife's name that were found to have held hundreds of thousands of dollars, and were never declared when he assumed the ministry as per Illicit Gains Law 62/1975, nor frozen as were his other assets both locally and internationally.
