= Rabiu =

- Gender: MALE
- Language: Hausa

Origin
- Language: Arabic
- Origin: Nigerian
- Region of origin: Northern Nigeria

Rabiu is a Nigerian name for males of Hausa origin. It is derived from the Arabic name "Rabi'" which means "fourth" or "springtime". Rabiu signifies the concept of renewal and refreshing changes. It carries a sense of optimism and new beginnings. Rabiu is sometimes added to a given name to indicate the fourth sibling bearing it.

== Notable people with the name ==
- Rabiu Afolabi, Nigerian footballer
- Rabiu Baita, Nigerian footballer
- Ibrahim Rabiu, Nigerian footballer
- Rabiu Kwankwaso, Nigerian politician
- Mohammed Rabiu, Ghanaian footballer
- Isyaku Rabiu, Nigerian businessman
- Abdul Samad Rabiu, Nigerian businessman
- Kabiru Rabiu, Nigerian entrepreneur
- Rabiu Ali, Nigerian footballer
- Mario Rabiu, Nigerian professional footballer
