= Nafiu Isyaku Rabiu =

Nigerian businessman

- Born: Kano, Kano province (now in Kano State)
- Occupation: Businessman
- Father: Isyaku Rabiu
- Relatives: Abdul Samad Rabiu; Kabiru Isyaku Rabiu

Nafiu Isyaku Rabiu is a prominent businessman from Kano who became infamous for killing his wife. He is the eldest son of the late Alhaji Isyaku Rabiu, a well respected Sheikh and businessman. His younger brother Abdulsamad Rabiu is the second richest individual in Nigeria and fourth wealthiest in Africa.

Rabiu underwent a legal process initiated by the Kano state government, which attracted significant attention within the state. The legal proceedings took place in a courtroom overseen by Kano's last British judge, who ultimately declared him not guilty. However, the verdict led to substantial public outcry and allegations of corruption, prompting a subsequent trial overseen by a Nigerian judge. In this new trial, Rabiu was found guilty of culpable homicide not punishable with death and subsequently incarcerated by the Court of Appeal of the country on 5 May 1980. This particular murder case, titled Nafiu Rabiu v. Kano state, left a mark on both the legal history of Nigeria and the consciousness of the state's populace. The courtroom where the trial took place is now colloquially referred to as "Kotun Nafiu" or "Nafiu's Court."

== Personal life ==
Nafiu Rabiu was born and raised in the city of Kano. He was the eldest son of Sheikh Isyaku Rabiu's forty-two children. During the 1970s, Rabiu became known for his opulent lifestyle. A glimpse into Rabiu's lavishness was captured in a 1984 documentary produced jointly by BBC and NTA, which delved into corruption in Nigeria. Titled Nigeria: A Squandering of Riches and presented by Onyeka Onwenu, the documentary featured scenes of Rabiu being driven around Kano in one of his two Rolls Royce cars, with Onwenu remarking that he owned six other vehicles. He was also shown entering one of his two luxury jets "which cost a million pounds a year simply to maintain." His wife, Fatima, was a daughter of Tijjani Aliyu Dagazau, another affluent businessman in Kano.

== Nafiu Rabiu v. Kano state ==
=== Background ===
On 9 May 1979, Nafiu and Fatima hosted three of their friends in the garden of their Dawaki Road residence in Kano. The District Head of Jahun was among the guests, leaving the residence between 10 p.m. and 11p.m. According to him, Fatima "was quite alright" when he left them. Nafiu's driver and cook also confirmed that they left Fatima "in good health, joking...", before retiring for the night.

After the District Head's departure, only Nafiu and Fatima remained in the house. The following morning, the cook arrived at the residence but found the entrance gate locked. Shortly after, he met the driver, who was usually left with the key, and asked for it. The driver informed him that Nafiu had taken the key the previous night.

About two hours later, Rabiu, still in the main house, threw the key to the driver from a window. Not long after, he asked the cook to open the kitchen door, claiming to have misplaced the key to the main entrance. Subsequently, Nafiu came out of the house carrying a briefcase and "soiled blankets and clothes," which he handed over to the driver, instructing him to place them in the trunk of his Peugeot 504 car. He later told the driver to pick up his mother-in-law from Kano airport, who was to arrive from Niamey that morning, using his other car, a Mercedes-Benz saloon. For the first time since he was hired, Nafiu left the cook the key of the door leading from the kitchen into other parts of the main house and asked him to give Fatima "whatever she required, whenever she woke up", before he drove away in the Peugeot with the soiled garments in the trunk.

Meanwhile, upon his return from the airport, the driver reported to Nafiu's office located 'elsewhere in the city'. Nafiu directed the driver to take the Peugeot to a mechanic for repairs. But before doing so, the driver checked the car's trunk to remove the "soiled blankets and clothes" he had placed there earlier in the day, only to discover that they were no longer there.

At around 2 p.m., Nafiu's children were driven home, at his request, by one of his other drivers. Upon their arrival, the children went to Fatima's room. Subsequently, they alerted the cook, concerned after their mother was not responding to their calls. The cook suggested that they wait for Nafiu to return before taking any further action. Consequently, the cook contacted Nafiu and informed him of the situation. Nafiu promptly returned home shortly thereafter. Together, they all proceeded to the room, where they found her lifeless body. Signs of froth were apparent in her mouth and nostrils, and there were wounds on various parts of her body, including her back.

The news of Fatima's death generated considerable attention, and Nafiu was immediately cast under suspicion given that he was the sole individual present in the house with Fatima at the time. This suspicion escalated to the point that the then-governor of Kano state, Abubakar Rimi, publicly vowed to ensure that Nafiu faced severe consequences, even to the extent of being sentenced to death.

=== Trial ===
The Kano state government took Nafiu to court and charged him with the offence of culpable homicide, punishable with death under section 221(b) of the penal code in the High Court of Kano state. The prosecution presented witnesses who testified about the events leading to the death of Fatima. These witnesses were not cross-examined on certain aspects of their testimony, which related to the circumstances surrounding the death. Medical evidence was provided by Dr. Bansi Badan Tribedi, a senior Consultant Pathologist on the Kano Health services management board who carried out the autopsy on the body of the deceased. He noted that the deceased's likely cause of death was “due to asphyxia resulting from strangulation; choking by hands.”

At the conclusion of the trial, the trial judge considered the evidence presented by the prosecution, noting that the appellant did not testify and therefore could infer that the prosecution's evidence, which was unchallenged, was true. The trial judge also dismissed the possibility of an outside intruder being responsible for the homicide, as there was no evidence of a break-in. The trial judge further examined the cause of death based on expert medical evidence provided by the defense. However, the judge was unable to conclude beyond reasonable doubt that the death was due to strangulation. Consequently, the trial judge acquitted and discharged Nafiu, finding him not guilty.

The trial judge was C.J. Jones, Kano state's last British judge. Jones retired from service and left Nigeria "immediately on the conclusion of this case". Unsubstantiated rumors circulated, alleging that Jones was spotted leaving Kano airport with his luggage filled with cash provided by Nafiu. This allegation triggered a significant public uproar, prompting the state government to challenge the verdict by lodging an appeal with the Court of Appeal in Kaduna. Subsequently, the Court of Appeal acceded to the appeal, leading to a reversal of the earlier decision. Furthermore, the Court "set aside the order of acquittal and convicted the appellant of the offence of culpable homicide not punishable with death contrary to Section 222(4) and punishable under Section 224 of the Penal Code, and sentenced him to 4 years imprisonment."

=== Appeal against guilty verdict ===
Nafiu lodged an appeal against this ruling, presenting a substantial legal query. This question revolves around the argument that based on the provisions outlined in Sections 220 and 222 of the Constitution of Nigeria (1979), the Federal Court of Appeal did not possess the jurisdiction to consider the appeal against the initial order of acquittal granted by the High Court in Kano. The argument revolved around how "decision" is understood in Section 277 of the Constitution. Nafiu claimed that the Federal Court of Appeal made a legal mistake by even considering the appeal and insisted it should have simply rejected it outright.

In the presence of Justices Udo Udoma, Ayo Irikefe, Chukwunweike Idigbe, Andrews Otutu Obaseki, Kayode Eso, Augustine Nnamani, Muhammadu Lawal Uwais, the court dismissed the appeal and upheld the conviction and sentence imposed by the Federal Court of Appeal.

Nafiu spent "a few years in jail" before being released and have since been free. Due to this conviction, Nafiu was deemed "unstable" to assume control of his father's business empire. As a result, his younger brother, Abdulsamad, stepped in to take over the reins of the business at the age of 24.
