= List of Dutch by net worth =

As of 2026, there are fourteen billionaires in the Netherlands, according to Forbes.

== 2026 Dutch billionaires list ==
World Rank	Name	Citizenship	Residence	Net worth (USD)	Source of wealth
53	Jean-Louis van der Velde	Netherlands	Hong Kong	38 billion	Tether Limited, Bitfinex
160	Charlene de Carvalho-Heineken	Netherlands	London	17.9 billion	Heineken
520	Remon Vos	Netherlands	Český Šternberk	7.4 billion	CTP
1074	Kommer Damen	Netherlands	Gorinchem	4 billion	Damen Group
1676	Arnout Schuijff	Netherlands	Amsterdam	2.5 billion	Adyen
1764	John de Mol Jr.	Netherlands	Blaricum	2.4 billion	TV programs
2177	Lesley Bamberger	Netherlands	Amsterdam	1.9 billion	Kroonenberg Groep
2177	Joop van den Ende	Netherlands	Baarn	1.9 billion	TV shows
2274	Pieter van der Does	Netherlands	Amsterdam	1.8 billion	Adyen
2481	Rolly van Rappard	Netherlands	London	1.6 billion	CVC Capital Partners
2712	Adriaan Mol	Netherlands	Amsterdam	1.4 billion	Mollie
2858	Martin Lavoo	Netherlands	Singapore	1.3 billion	Nippon Paint
3017	Steven Schuurman	Netherlands	Amsterdam	1.2 billion	Elastic NV

== See also ==
- Lists of billionaires
- List of countries by the number of billionaires
- Lists of people by nationality
- List of Dutch people
