= List of Egyptians by net worth =

The following is a list of Egyptian billionaires. It is based on an annual assessment of wealth and assets compiled and published by Forbes magazine in April every year.

== 2024 Egyptian billionaires ==
Global ranking	Image	Name	Citizenship	Net worth (USD) !! Sources of wealth	
287		Nassef Sawiris	Egypt	8.8 billion	Construction, Investments
835		Naguib Sawiris	Egypt	3.8 billion	Telecommunication
991		Mohamed Mansour	Egypt	3.3 billion	Automotive
2287		Youssef Mansour	Egypt	1.3 billion	Automotive
2410		Yasseen Mansour	Egypt	1.2 billion	Real Estate, Automotive

== See also ==
- List of wealthiest families
