= International School of Tanganyika =

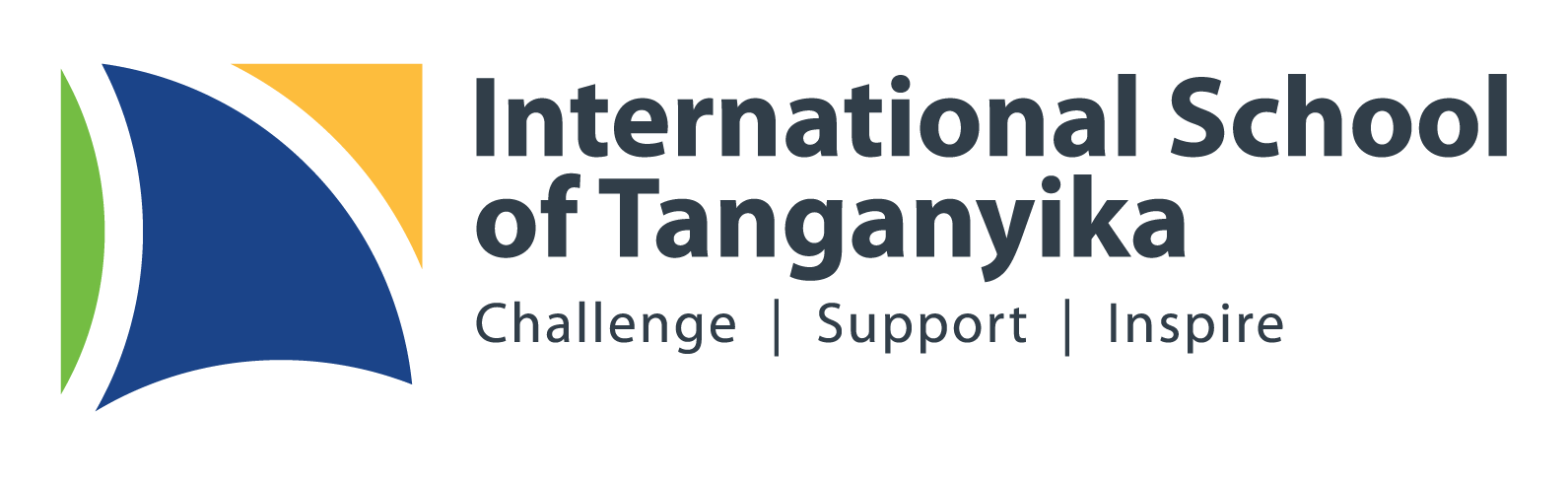

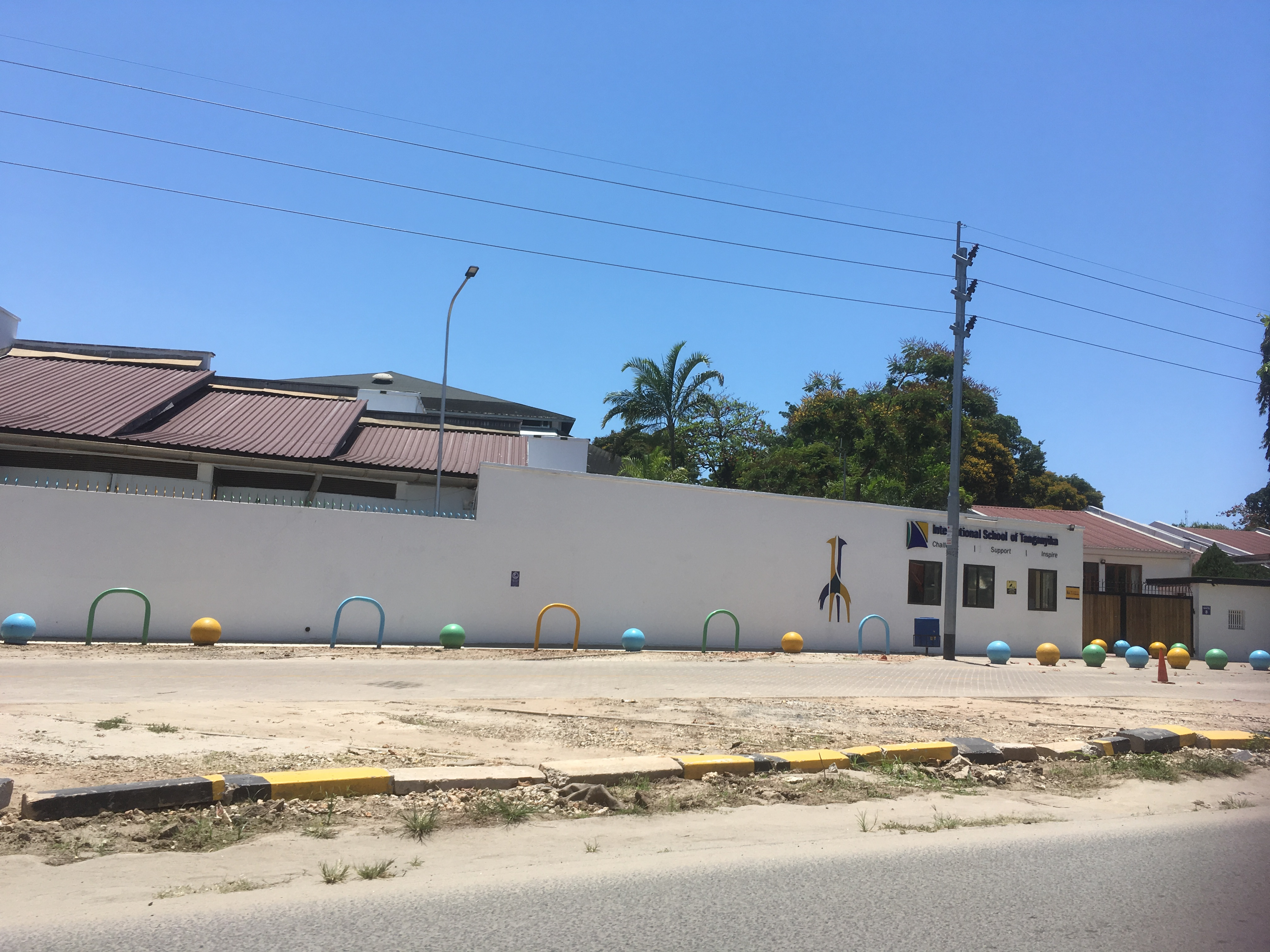

Location
- Dar es Salaam; Tanzania
- Coordinates: 6°45′34″S 39°16′40″E\

Information
- Type: International school International Baccalaureate
- Motto: Challenge Support Inspire
- Established: 1963
- Locale: Dar Es Salaam, Tanzania
- Director: Ms. Melaine Vrba
- Grades: Early Childhood - Grade 12
- Enrollment: about 1000
- Colors: green, blue, yellow, black
- Mascot: Twiga
- Website: www.istafrica.co.tz

The International School of Tanganyika (IST), founded in 1963, is an international school in Dar es Salaam, Tanzania. The school is an IB World School that hosts the Primary Years, Middle Years, and Diploma programmes. IST operates on two campuses in desirable suburbs of Dar es Salaam, Tanzania. IST Elementary serves children from age 3 to Grade 5 while IST Secondary, 5 kilometers away, serves Grades 6 – 12. IST is fully accredited by the Council of International Schools (CIS) and the Middle States Association (MSA).

== Students at IST ==
IST is a diverse international school currently serving about 1000 students from across the globe: 22% of the students are Tanzanians, 15% American, 10% British, 8% Indian, and the remainder from approximately 60 other nationalities. The Elementary Campus offers programmes for students from age 3 to Grade 5 and the Secondary Campus offers programmes from Grade 6 to 12. IST families are a mix of long-term residents, Tanzanian citizens, expatriates in a growing private sector, and NGO and diplomatic workers from numerous donor countries. To be admitted to the pre-Kindergarten a child must be 3 years of age before September 1.

Scholars from IST have gone to universities such as Georgia Institute of Technology, Berkeley, McGill, MIT, Harvard, Oxford, Cambridge, Yale, Brown, Duke University, LSE, UCL, Princeton, Columbia, Cornell and Stanford.

IST is open to anyone and everyone from all over the world. The school offers preschool for children aged 3–6, Primary school for children aged 6–11 and Secondary school for children aged 11–18. In addition to their academic studies, all students from Grade 6 and up engage in the community service-learning aspect of the IB CAS programme.

== Teachers at IST ==
In the 2017-18 school year, IST has about 120 teachers, including from the US, the UK, Tanzania, Canada and about 14 other countries. IST commits considerable resources to staff development and has a strong, collaborative professional culture.

== Academic performance ==
The average points score for IST students in the Class of 2017 was 34 (out of the maximum possible 45), compared with the worldwide average of 29.95 points. Students in the Class of 2017 earned 7 points (the maximum score possible) in the following higher level subjects: physics, biology, economics, geography, psychology and theatre. Two students earned bilingual (Swahili-English) diplomas.

== Special activities ==
Students and teachers take part in a range of adventure activities including annual treks up Mt. Kilimanjaro and Mt. Meru, trips to outstanding wildlife areas, camping, snorkeling, and sailing activities and beach peer-bonding days. Elementary students partake in overnight trips beginning in Grade 4. All Secondary students in Grades 6-11 annually participate in Extended Study Program week that includes trips around Dar, to Zanzibar and throughout Tanzania. They also have an opportunity to travel outside the country with the Model United Nations program, taking part in The Hague International Model United Nations as well as other MUN trips.

== Sports at IST ==
IST performs in regional ISSEA (International Schools of Southern and Eastern Africa) events in which International Schools from Uganda, Kenya, Ethiopia, Zambia, Zimbabwe, Mozambique and South Africa compete and collaborate in various sports and cultural exchanges such as basketball, volleyball, swimming, track and field, STEM, Band & Choir, Art & Drama and football.

== Notable alumni ==
- Yusuf Bakhresa - Managing Director of Azam Media Limited and director in the Group Companies.
- Khalid Bakhresa deceased 2007 - Azam Ice cream
- Mohammed Dewji - Former member of the Tanzanian Parliament and President of MeTL group
- Usman Ally - Actor
- Mariam Naficy - Founder and CEO of Minted, attended IST Elementary
- Saurabh Khetrapal - entrepreneur
- Gwamaka Kifukwe - a researcher at UONGOZI Institute
- Walter Kitundu - music composer
- Mark Latham - music director at The New Hampshire Philharmonic, attended IST Elementary
- Sue Stolberger - artist
- Kali Ongala - Footballer and former coach of Azam FC
- Magdalena Moshi - Olympic Swimmer
- Sho Madjozi - South African rapper and poet
- Levi Roach - Medieval Historian
- Jal Patel - Author
- Helen McCrory - Actor
- Kirabo Jackson - Professor of Economics and Appointed to President Biden's Council of Economic Advisors
