= Barbara Gonzalez (business executive) =

Tanzanian sports business executive (born 1990)

- Born: Barbara Jaime Gonzalez; 18 February 1990 (age 36); Dar Es Salaam, Tanzania
- Other name: Barbara Gonzalez
- Occupation: Business executive
- Employer: Simba Sport Club
- Office: Chief Executive officer
- Predecessor: Crescentius Magori
- Successor: Imani Majura

Barbara Jaime Gonzalez (born 18 February 1990) Popularly known as Barbara Gonzalez is a Tanzanian sports business executive and former chief executive officer of a Tanzanian football club Simba Sport Club.

== Life summary ==
The daughter of a Colombian father, Barbara Gonzalez grew up in Dar es Salaam. She studied economics in the United States, and development management in England. She undertook several internships in the United Nations, before returning to Tanzania in 2014 and working as a public sector consultant for a financial group. In 2016 the billionaire Mohammed Dewji gave her a job as head of his Foundation and chief of staff. In 2018 she joined the board of Simba S.C. in 2018. In September 2020, aged 30, she was made CEO of the club.
