= Sefrioui =

Sefrioui is a surname. Notable people with the surname include:

- Ahmed Sefrioui (1915–2004), Moroccan novelist
- Anas Sefrioui (born 1957), Moroccan businessman
