= Issad =

Issad may refer to:

- Issad Rebrab (b. 1944), Algerian entrepreneur
- Issad Younis, cast member in The Yacoubian Building, a 2006 Egyptian movie
- Issad (rural locality), a rural locality (a village) in Volkhovsky District of Leningrad Oblast, Russia
