= Xceed (company) =

European live events marketplace

- Company type: Private
- Industry: Software as a service
- Founded: 2014 in Milan, Italy
- Founders: Mattia Franco; Luca Papaleo
- Headquarters: Barcelona, Spain
- Area served: Worldwide
- Key people: Mattia Franco (CEO); Luca Papaleo (COO)
- Website: xceed.me

Xceed (stylized in all caps) is a marketplace for live music, nightlife, and cultural events. It is based in Barcelona, Spain.

== History ==
Xceed was founded in Milan, Italy in 2014 by Mattia Franco, Luca Papaleo, and Davide Villano. In the same year, Xceed introduced Nightgraph (later renamed as Xceed Pro) as its first SaaS platform for event organizers, bundling ticketing, guest-list check-in, CRM and live analytics into a single dashboard.

Xceed's initial external funding occurred in April 2015 with a €550,000 pre-seed investment from 360 Capital Partners. In October 2019, it secured €2.3 million in seed funding from multiple investors. Post-investment, Xceed focused on expansion within Southern Europe.

In 2016, Xceed launched its media outlet Nightmag to cover nightlife and electronic music culture.

In November 2022, Xceed raised €2 million from investors Trind Ventures, Best Nights VC, and SuperHero Capital to support further European expansion.

In 2025, Xceed was rebranded as XCEED with an updated interface.

== Apps ==
Xceed provides a consumer-oriented app, Xceed, and two business-oriented apps, Xceed Pro for event management and Xceed Access for on-site check-in. The Xceed consumer-oriented app uses Machine learning to suggest events based on user preferences and location. All apps are available on Android and iOS.

== Recognition ==
In 2018, Xceed was named as Tech5 by The Next Web (TNW) and Adyen – Fastest Growing Startup in Spain. A year later, in 2019, Mattia Franco was named in Forbes 30 Under 30 list. In 2025, Xceed was included in the Financial Times Fastest Growing Companies in Europe. Xceed was also recognized in both 2024 and 2025 by Il Sole 24 Ore & Statista – Growth Leaders.
