= CASE 30 =

The CASE 30 is a stock market index of the Cairo & Alexandria Stock Exchange in Egypt. It includes the 30 most active stocks in the Egyptian stock market, weighted to their market capitalization. The index was started with a base level of 1000 as of January 01, 1998.

== EGX 30 ==
In March 2009, its name was changed to EGX 30. EGX 30 index value is calculated in local currency terms and denominated in US dollars since 1998. EGX started publishing its dollar denominated index on 1st of March 2009. EGX 30 index includes the top 30 companies in terms of liquidity and activity. EGX 30 Index is weighted by market capitalization and adjusted by the free float. Adjusted Market capitalization of a listed company is the number of its listed shares multiplied by the closing price of that company multiplied by the percent of freely floated shares. For a company to be included in EGX 30 index, it must have at least 15% free float. This ensures market participants that the index constituents truly represent actively traded companies and that the index is a good and reputable barometer for the Egyptian market.
