= Mike Adenuga =

Nigerian businessman (born 1953)

Chief Mike Adenuga CSG GCON
- Born: 29 April 1953 (age 73); Ibadan, Southern Region, British Nigeria (now in Oyo State, Nigeria)
- Education: Ibadan Grammar School; Northwestern Oklahoma State University; Pace University
- Occupations: Founder of Globacom; Chairman of Conoil
- Spouses: Adefolake Emilia Adenuga; Titi Joyce Adenuga
- Children: 7, including Bella Disu

Chief Michael Adeniyi Agbolade Ishola Adenuga Jr CSG GCON (born 29 April 1953) is a Nigerian billionaire businessman, and the fifth richest person in Africa according to Forbes. His company Globacom is Nigeria's second-largest telecom operator and also has a presence in Ghana and Benin. He owns stakes in the Equitorial Trust Bank and the oil exploration firm Conoil (formerly Consolidated Oil Company).

Forbes estimated his net worth at $6.7 billion as of May 2024.

== Early life ==
His father, Oloye Michael Agbolade Adenuga Sr, was a schoolteacher while his mother, Omoba Juliana Oyindamola Adenuga (née Onashile, of Okesopin, Ijebu Igbo), was a businesswoman of royal Ijebu descent. He is a Yoruba.

Adenuga received his secondary school education at Ibadan Grammar School, Ibadan, Oyo State, Nigeria and Comprehensive High School, Aiyetoro, for his Higher School Certificate (HSC). He worked as a taxi driver to help fund his university education. He graduated from Northwestern Oklahoma State University and Pace University, New York, with degrees in Business Administration.

== Career ==
Adenuga made his first million in 1979, at age 26, selling lace and distributing soft drinks. In 1990, he received a drilling license and in 1991, his Consolidated Oil struck oil in the shallow waters of Southwestern Ondo State, making him the first indigenous oil company to do so in commercial quantity.

He was issued a conditional GSM license in 1999. After it was revoked, he received a second one when the government held another auction in 2003.

He was named African Entrepreneur of The Year at the first African Telecoms Awards (ATA) in August 2007.

In May 2015, Adenuga made a takeover bid to purchase Ivorian mobile telecom's operator Comium Côte d'Ivoire for $600 million.

== Honours ==
In 2012, he was made Grand Commander of the Order of the Niger by the government of Nigeria.

He holds a Yoruba tribal chieftaincy as the "Otunba Apesin" of the Ijebu clan.

In 2018, he was decorated with the insignia of a Commander of the Legion of Honour by President Emmanuel Macron of France.

Adenuga was cited as one of the Top 100 most influential Africans by New African magazine in 2019.

== See also ==
- List of Yoruba people
