= Mohammed Dewji =

Tanzanian billionaire businessman and politician (born 1975)

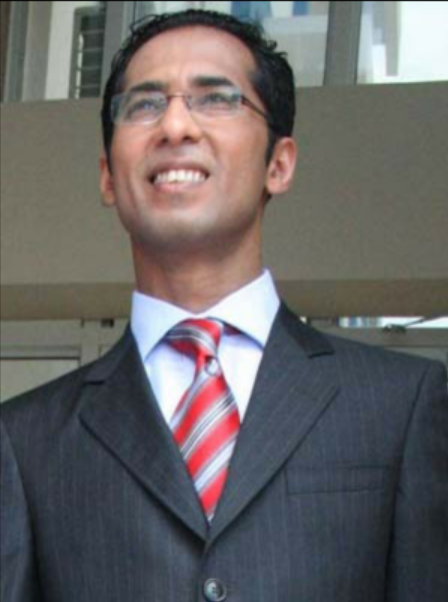
- Dewji in 2013

Member of Parliament for Singida Urban
- In office 14 December 2005 – 9 July 2015
- Preceded by: Jumanne Nguli
- Succeeded by: Mussa Ramadhani Sima

Group Managing Director & Group CEO of Mohammed Enterprises

Personal details
- Born: 8 May 1975 (age 51) Singida, Tanzania
- Party: CCM
- Spouse: Saira Dewji (m. 2001)
- Children: 3
- Education: Georgetown University
- Occupation: Business magnate, Industrialist, Philanthropist
- Known for: Co-owner of Simba S.C.
- Awards: four-time Tanzanian Premier League Championships

Mohammed "Mo" Gulamabbas Dewji (born 8 May 1975) is a Tanzanian billionaire businessman and former politician. He is the owner of MeTL Group, a Tanzanian conglomerate founded by his grandmother, developed by his father in the 1970s. Dewji served as Member of the Tanzanian Parliament for Chama Cha Mapinduzi (CCM) from 2005 to 2015 for his home town of Singida. As of October 2024, Dewji has an estimated net worth of US$1.8 billion, Africa's 17th richest person and youngest billionaire. Dewji was the first Tanzanian on the cover of Forbes magazine, in 2013.

== Early life ==
Dewji was born in Singida. He is the second of six children of Gulamabbas Dewji and Zubeda Dewji. They are Twelver Shias whose ancestors left Gujarat, India in the late 1800s to become traders in East Africa. When Dewji was born, the family was still of modest means; Dewji was born with the help of a neighbouring midwife in a house built from sand and mud. Dewji attested that he almost died at birth due to having the umbilical cord wrapped around his neck, a condition known as nuchal cord. By the time Dewji started school, his father had built a family shop into a thriving import-export company.

Dewji received his primary education in Arusha at the Arusha Primary School and continued his secondary education at the International School of Tanganyika (IST) in Dar es Salaam, Tanzania.

In 1992 his father enrolled him at the Arnold Palmer Golf Academy in Orlando, Florida, where Dewji also attended Trinity Preparatory School for 11th grade. Dewji then moved for his last and final year of high school to Saddle Brook High School in Saddle Brook, New Jersey.

Dewji attended Georgetown University in Washington, D.C., graduating in 1998 with a bachelor's degree in international business and finance and a minor in theology.

== Career ==
=== Business ===
Upon graduation from university, Dewji returned home and assumed the management of Mohammed Enterprises Tanzania Limited (MeTL), a commodities trading business founded by his grandmother, according to his recent instagram video. After two years of working with the company, he became chief financial officer (CFO) at MeTL. In the early 2000s, when the Tanzanian government privatized loss-making companies, he acquired them inexpensively and turned them into profit centers by trimming personnel expenses. MeTL Group of Companies is the largest privately owned conglomerate in Tanzania.

Dewji is responsible for increasing MeTL's revenues from $30 million to over $1.5 billion between 1999 and 2018. MeTL Group has investments in manufacturing, agriculture, trading, finance, mobile telephony, insurance, real estate, transport and logistics, and food and beverages. The group conducts business in 11 countries and employs over 28,000 people with the aim to target over 100,000 people by 2021. MeTL's operations contribute ~3.5% of Tanzania's GDP.

According to Forbes, Dewji has an estimated net worth of US$1.9 billion (2019), and is the 17th richest person in Africa and Africa's youngest billionaire (2018). His wealth is reportedly managed by Zaoui & Co. and Mohammed Abrar Asif of HFPCG. He was the first Tanzanian on the cover of Forbes magazine, in 2013 and has appeared on three occasions. Forbes Africa recognized Dewji as their Person of the Year in 2015.

=== Politics ===
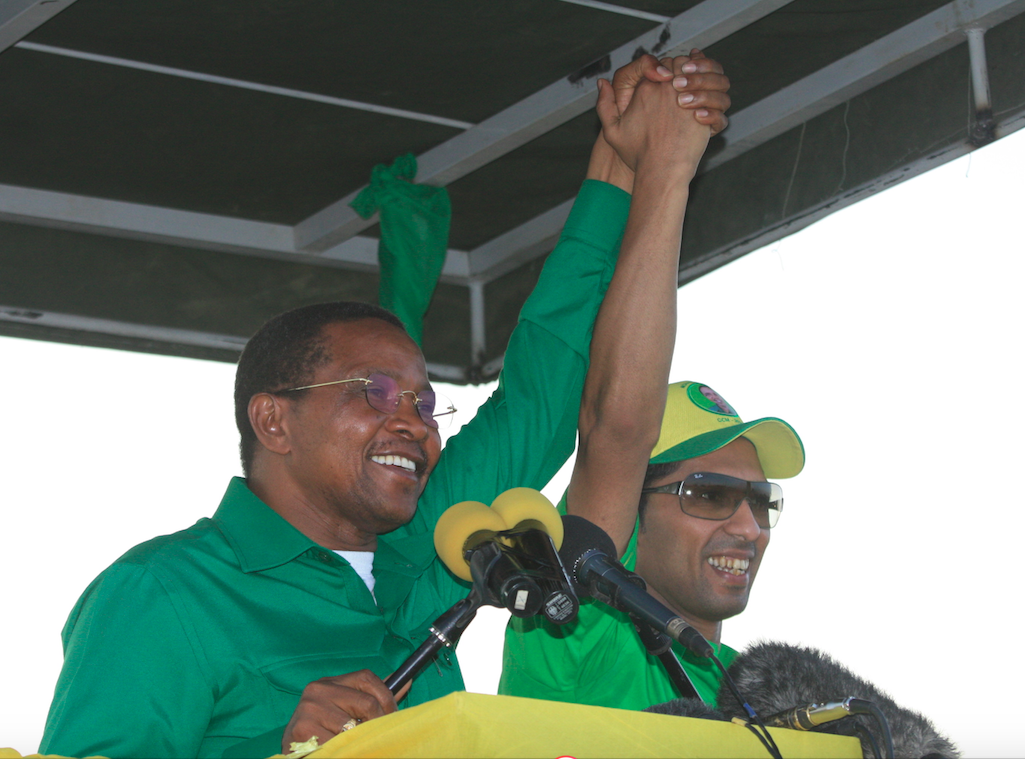
Former President of Tanzania, H.E. Jakaya Kikwete and Mohammed Dewji during a political rally in 2010.

In 2000, Tanzania hosted its second multiparty elections where Dewji, at the age of 25 competed to become the Member of Parliament (MP) for Singida Urban. Despite winning the preliminary votes for the ruling party, Chama Cha Mapinduzi (CCM) with an overwhelming majority, Dewji was deemed too young to hold the parliamentary seat.

Tanzania held its third multi-party elections in October 2005 and Dewji stood for the parliamentary seat again and was chosen by CCM to stand as a candidate for Singida Urban. In the general election he won with 90% of the votes and was sworn in as an MP for Singida Urban constituency on 29 December 2005. Dewji served for ten years before resigning from politics in October 2015.

== Personal life ==
In 2001, Dewji married Saira, his high school sweetheart with whom he has three children. They reside in Dar es Salaam, Tanzania. Dewji is a Shia Muslim from the Khoja Shia Ithna-Asheri Jamat also known as the 'Twelver’ branch of Islam.

=== Kidnapping ===
At approximately 5:35 am on 11 October 2018, Dewji was kidnapped by gunmen outside the Colosseum Hotel in Dar es Salaam as he arrived for a morning workout. The kidnappers allegedly fired shots in the air before kidnapping Dewji and driving off with the billionaire. Despite Dewji's wealth, he did not usually travel with a security detail. He had driven to the Colosseum Hotel gym on his own the morning of the attack.

By 13 October, at least twenty people were arrested as a result of the investigation into Dewji's disappearance. At a press conference on October 15, the family offered TSh 1,000,000,000/= (US$440,000) as a reward for information leading to his rescue.

At approximately 2:30 am on 20 October, in a telephone call to his family, Dewji said he had been released at the Gymkhana grounds. At 3:15 am, a tweet was sent out on the METL Twitter account by Dewji, acknowledging his return and appreciation for the Tanzanian people's support. In a video release, Police Commissioner Lazaro Mambosasa was seen talking to Dewji, who acknowledged the efforts of the police to find his kidnappers. Mambosasa clarified that Dewji met them at his house and was not rescued by police. He also reported that Dewji informed them that his kidnappers were speaking in a South African language. January Makamba tweeted that he had met Dewji and noticed rope marks on his hands and legs. In a 2019 interview to the BBC Dewji stated that no ransom had been paid. He believes the kidnappers gave up due to the massive media and political attention his kidnapping received.

=== Wealth ===
Since the inaugural ranking of Forbes list of Africa's richest in 2011, Dewji has ranked richest in East Africa as well as richest in Tanzania 11 times. In 2024 he ranked 1764 richest in the world, 12th richest in Africa, richest in East Africa as well as richest in Tanzania with a net worth of $1.8 billion.

== Philanthropy ==
Dewji established the Mo Dewji Foundation in 2014. Dewji joined the Giving Pledge, committing to give at least half his wealth to philanthropy either during their lifetime or in his will. Dewji is the first Tanzanian and one of the three Africans that have made the pledge.

== Honours and awards ==
- 2012: Young Global Leader by the World Economic Forum
- 2014: 10 Most Powerful Men In Africa, Forbes Magazine
- 2014: African Philanthropist of the Year Award by the African Leadership magazine
- 2014: Top 100 of young economic leaders
- 2015: Philanthropist of the Year Award for the East African region by All Africa Business Leaders Awards (AABLA)
- 2015: Business Leader of the Year Award by African Business Magazine
- 2015: Forbes Africa's Person Of The Year 2015
- 2016: Choiseul 100 Africa 2016: Economic Leaders for Tomorrow
- 2022: Honorary Doctorate in Humane Letters from McDonough School of Business, Georgetown University

== See also ==
- Politics of Tanzania
- Economy of Tanzania
- List of Black billionaires
- List of Africans by net worth
