= Glo (company) =

Nigerian multinational telecommunications company

Globacom Ltd. (Global communication)
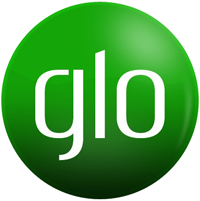
- Type: Private corporation
- Industry: Telecommunications
- Founded: 29 August 2003; 23 years ago
- Headquarters: Lagos, Lagos State, Nigeria
- Key people: Mike Adenuga (Chairman); Bella Disu (Executive Vice Chairman)
- Products: Integrated telecommunication services, etc
- Revenue: $1.178 billion (2013)
- Owner: Mike Adenuga
- Number of employees: 3,379 (June 2019)
- Website: www.gloworld.com

Globacom Limited, commonly known as Glo (Global communication), is a Nigerian multinational telecommunications company. It was founded in 2003 by Mike Adenuga.

== Overview ==
As of February 2023, GLO has over 60.7 million subscribers, making it the second largest network operator in Nigeria.

In 2011, GLO became the first telecommunications company to build an $800 million high-capacity fibre-optic cable known as Glo-1, a submarine cable from the United Kingdom to Nigeria. It is the first successful submarine cable from the United Kingdom to Nigeria.

Globacom has the following strategic business units: Glo mobile, Glo Broad Access, Glo Gateway, and Glo-1.

== Ownership ==
GLO is privately owned by the Mike Adenuga Group which also consists of Cobblestone Properties and Estates, a real estate and property development company, Conoil PLC, a petroleum marketing company, and Conoil Producing, a crude exploration and production company.

== Strategic business units ==
=== Glo Mobile ===
Glo Mobile, a subsidiary of Globacom, is Nigeria's second largest Mobile Network Operator. In the first year of operation, it had one million subscribers in over 87 towns in Nigeria and over 120 billion Naira in revenues. Glo Mobile has now spread to other African countries, namely Benin and Ghana. Glo later sold its Ghana subsidiary to Airtel when it exited the mobile communication space of Ghana to focus on enterprise telecom services. Glo Mobile's subscriber base in Nigeria stood at over 45 million by December 2018.

By November 2020, the subscription level had hit 54 million, but by September 2024, the subscription level had dropped to 19.1 million.

=== Glo 1 submarine cable ===
GLO-1 is the first successful submarine cable from the United Kingdom to Nigeria, and GLO is the first individual African company to embark on such a project.

GLO-1 has the potential to provide high speed internet services, faster, more reliable and cheaper telecom services. Glo-1 will potentially facilitate foreign investment and employment opportunities especially to Africans.

The 9,800 km long cable originates from Bude in the UK and is laid from this origin to Alpha Beach in Lagos, where it will have its landing station. Glo-1 will also improve teleconferencing, distance learning, disaster recovery and telemedicine among several other benefits for Nigerians and the people of West Africa.

=== By country ===
In August 2003, Glo Mobile was launched in Nigeria. Glo Mobile introduced lower tariffs, pay per second billing and alongside other value added services. Although Glo Mobile was the fourth GSM operator to launch in Nigeria, within seven years of the company's operation, its subscriber base has grown to over 25 million.

In June 2008, Glo Mobile was launched in Benin. Glo Mobile showed unprecedented growth through the sale of 600,000 SIM cards in the first ten days of operation. Glo Mobile offered Per Second Billing, which charges subscribers for the exact airtime used. They also offered other value added services such as MMS (Multimedia Messaging Service), Glo Magic Plus news and information, vehicle tracking, musical ring-back tones and mobile banking.

In May 2008, GLO acquired an operating license through its Glo Mobile division in Ghana and plans to capture 30% of the current 11 million subscriber market within 18 months of launch. They plan on achieving this goal by launching with bundled voice and Internet services for Ghana and through specifically targeting ‘un-serviced’ areas outside Ghana's two major cities, Accra and Kumasi. Glo Mobile was set to launch in Ghana the first quarter of 2010. This has however been postponed to the third quarter of 2011, and again to 2012. In January 2012, Glo Ghana opened the "Reserve your number" campaign, but still without opening the network. On 8 April 2011 GLO launched the sub-marine optical fiber GLO1, one part of its maiden operation in Ghana, to usher in another major player in the Ghana telecommunication industry.

In October 2009, GLO acquired submarine cable landing rights and International Gateway Services in Côte d'Ivoire.

== Operations ==
As of February 2023, Glo boasts over 60.7 million subscribers, making it the second-largest network operator in Nigeria. The company operates several strategic business units, including Glo Mobile (mobile services), Glo Broad Access (broadband services), Glo Gateway (international services), and Glo-1 (submarine cable services).

Glo Mobile has expanded its operations beyond Nigeria, establishing a presence in Benin. The company previously operated in Ghana but later sold its subsidiary to Airtel to focus on enterprise telecom services.

== Technology ==
Globacom has been at the forefront of technological innovation in Africa's telecommunications sector. The Glo-1 submarine cable system provides high-speed internet services, offering faster, more reliable, and cost-effective telecom solutions. This infrastructure supports the company's broadband services and enhances connectivity across the continent.

== Controversies ==
As of September 2024, Glo Mobile's subscriber base in Nigeria experienced a significant decline, dropping to 19.1 million subscribers. The reasons behind this decline have not been explicitly detailed in available sources.

== Sponsorships ==
GLO sponsors sports events.

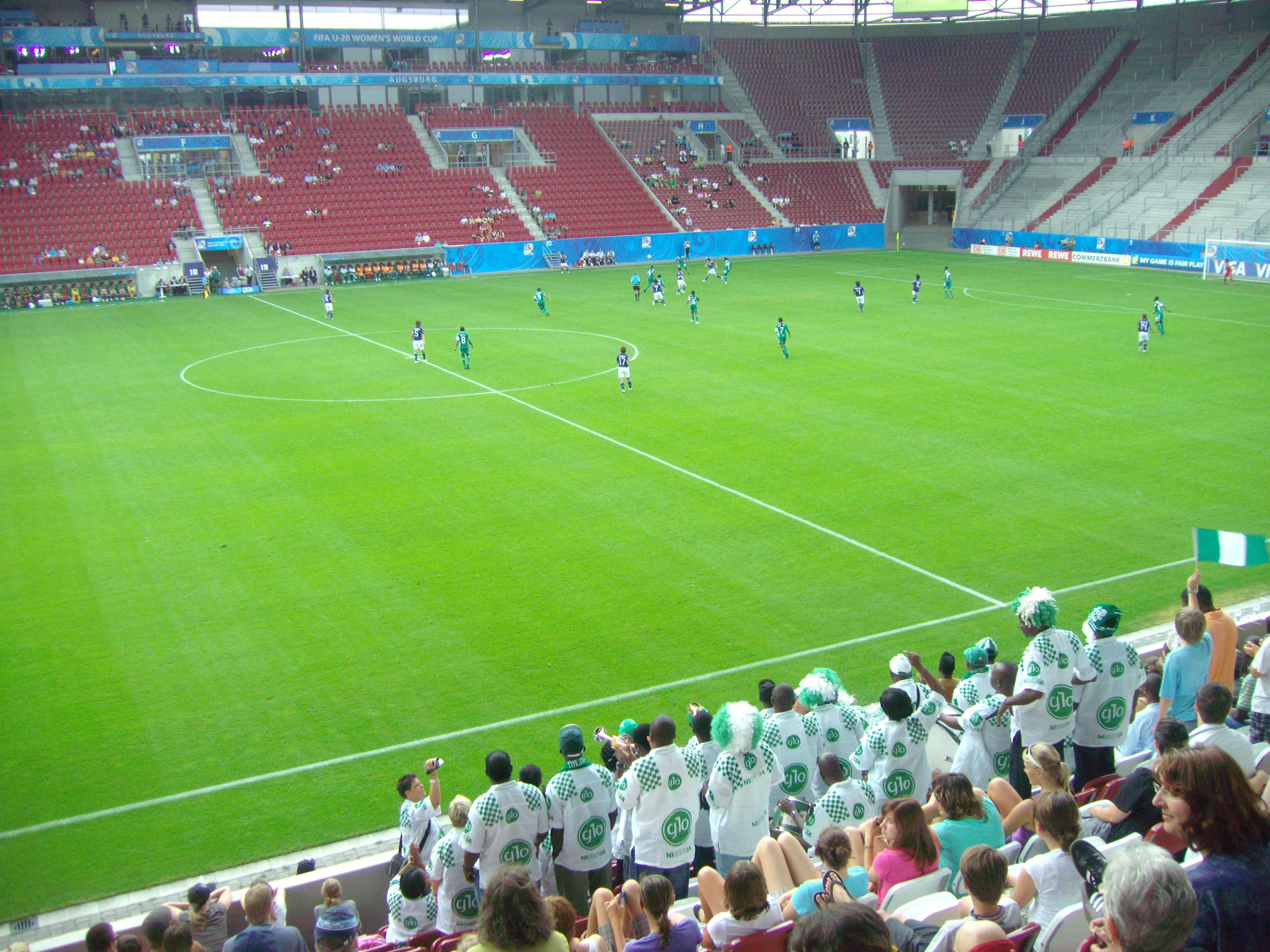
Nigerian supporters in GLO-Shirts at 2010 FIFA U-20 Women's World Cup

In Nigeria, GLO sponsored in 2009 the Nigerian Premier League, Nigerian National Football Teams, Nigeria Football Federation (NFF), Glo Lagos International Half Marathon, Glo People Police Marathon, Eyo Festival, Ojude Oba Festival, Eleghe Festival and the Confederation of African Football African Player of the Year Award.

In Benin, GLO sponsors the FITHEB and CAF African Player of the Year Award.

In Ghana, GLO sponsors the Glo Ghana Premier League, the Ghana National Football Teams and the CAF African Player of the Year Award.

In November 2009, GLO became an official sponsor of football club Manchester United. The sponsorship also includes young players from Benin, Ghana and Nigeria going to Manchester to train with the club.

Globacom is also the sole sponsor of African Voices on CNN. The programme's objective is to project game changers on the African continent and also promote the Globacom brand globally on CNN's platforms.

Globacom has used brand ambassadors including P-Square, Phyno, Wizkid and Tobi Amusan.

== History ==
In its inaugural year, Glo Mobile, a subsidiary of Globacom, achieved rapid growth by acquiring one million subscribers across 87 towns in Nigeria, generating over 120 billion Naira in revenues. The company introduced innovative services such as per-second billing and value-added offerings like MMS, vehicle tracking, and mobile banking, which contributed to its swift expansion. By December 2018, Glo Mobile's subscriber base in Nigeria had surpassed 45 million.

In 2005, Glo Mobile introduced the Glo Fleet Manager which is a vehicle tracking solution. Glo Fleet Manager helps transporters/fleet operators manage their fleet. They also introduced the Glo Mobile internet service which provides subscribers with access to internet sites which have been customized for mobile phone browsing.

In 2011, Globacom made a significant technological advancement by launching Glo-1, an $800 million high-capacity submarine fibre-optic cable connecting the United Kingdom to Nigeria. This infrastructure project was the first successful submarine cable of its kind from the UK to Nigeria, enhancing internet services and telecommunications reliability in the region.

== Entertainment ==
GLO collaborated with MTV on The Big Friday Show in 2012. This alliance made the show more interactive and gave viewers the opportunity for live appearances on the show. There was an added benefit of GLO subscribers winning the network's products every week.

In April 2013, GLO introduced the singing reality television show, the X Factor to Africa. The auditions were held in Nigeria and Ghana, with the ultimate prize being a $150,000 cash reward as well as a deal to be managed and produced by Sony Music to record an album.

In November 2023, Glo hosted the 20th anniversary event called "An Evening with Glo", where the company unveiled its new creative direction, "Powering Your Ambition." The initiative emphasizes Glo's commitment to helping businesses and individuals achieve their goals. The event also marked the company's 20th anniversary, reflecting on its growth and success. It was revealed that many of the company's creative ideas have been influenced by the leadership behind Glo's vision, showcasing the importance of strategic direction in its achievements.
