= Isyaku Rabiu =

Nigerian businessman (1925–2018)

Sheik Isyaku Rabiu

Personal life
- Born: 9 October 1925 Kano, British Nigeria
- Died: 8 May 2018 (aged 92) London, England
- Era: Modern era
- Region: Islam
- Notable work: Tafsir al Quran
- Occupation: Scholar

Religious life
- Religion: Islam
- Denomination: Tijaniyyah
- Movement: Tijaniyyah

Muslim leader
- Influenced by: Ibrahim Niass
- Children: 42 children including: Abdul Samad; Nafiu; Kabiru

Isyaku Rabiu (9 October 1925 – 7 May 2018) was a Nigerian businessman and an Islamic scholar who founded a holding company in Kano State. He was a supporter of Ibrahim Niasse's Tijaniyyah brotherhood.

== Early life ==
Rabiu was born to the family of Muhammadu Rabiu Dan Tinki, a Quranic preacher from the Bichi area of Kano State who led his own Quranic school. From 1936 to 1942, Rabiu attended his father's school learning the Quran and Arabic. He then moved to Maiduguri, Borno for further Islamic education. After spending four years in Maiduguri, he returned to Kano prepared to be an Islamic scholar. In 1949, Rabiu was an independent teacher of Arabic and the Quran who had among his audience, Ibrahim Musa Gashash.

== Career ==
In the early 1950s, while he was a teacher, Rabiu began to engage in private enterprise and established Isyaku Rabiu & Sons in 1952. Originally, the firm acted as an agent of UAC and traded in sewing machines, religious books, and bicycles. In 1958, when Kaduna Textile Limited was established, the firm became one of the early distributors.

Rabiu became the leading distributor in Northern Nigeria. In 1963, he joined a consortium of businessmen from Kano who formed Kano Merchants Trading Company. The establishments survived competition from foreign products. In 1970, Rabiu established a suit and packing factory.

Rabiu was a supporter of the National Party of Nigeria and likely benefited from state patronage as a result.

=== Isyaku Rabiu & Sons ===
Isyaku Rabiu & Sons, founded by Rabiu, is a family-operated holding company with a history of investment in manufacturing, insurance, banking and real estate. In the 1970s, the group invested in manufacturing, investing in Kano Suit and Packing Cases, a factory producing suit cases and handbags. The firm was a joint venture with Lebanese investors.

In 1972, he formed the Bagauda Textile Mill, manufacturing woven cloths for uniforms.

Rabiu then established ventures in across the economy including frozen food service, real estate, sugar and a motor vehicle and parts distribution company specialized in Daihatsu products. However, unfavorable exchange rates and economic conditions forced the company to scale back on manufacturing and return to its trading roots.
