= List of Moroccan people by net worth =

This is a list of Moroccan billionaires based on an annual assessment of wealth and assets compiled and published by Forbes.

== Moroccan Billionaires List ==
World Rank	Name	Citizenship	Net worth (USD)	Source of wealth
2443	Othman Benjelloun	Morocco	1.7 billion (As of 2026)	Bank of Africa
2545	Aziz Akhannouch	Morocco	1.6 billion (As of 2026)	Akwa Group
2653	Anas Sefrioui	Morocco	1.5 billion (As of 2026)	Groupe Addoha

== See also ==
- The World's Billionaires
- List of countries by number of billionaires
