= List of Nigerian billionaires by net worth =

The following is a list of Nigerian billionaires. It is based on an annual assessment of wealth and assets compiled and published by Forbes magazine.

== Lists ==
=== 2026 ===
2026
Name	Citizenship	Net worth (USD)	Sources of wealth
Aliko Dangote	Nigeria	51.5 billion	Oil, finance and investments
Abdulsamad Rabiu	Nigeria	12.5 billion	Diversified, cement
Mike Adenuga	Nigeria	7.0 billion	Telecommunications, food processing, real estate
Adebayo Ogunlesi	Nigeria United States	2.5 billion	Private Equity
Femi Otedola	Nigeria	1.9 billion	Telecom, oil, finance and investment
Tope Awotona	Nigeria United States	1.3 billion	Software

=== 2024 ===
2024
Name	Citizenship	Net worth (USD)	Sources of wealth
Aliko Dangote	Nigeria	27.3 billion	Oil, finance and investments
Abdulsamad Rabiu	Nigeria	7.6 billion	Diversified, cement
Mike Adenuga	Nigeria	7.3 billion	Telecommunications, food processing, real estate
Femi Otedola	Nigeria	4.7 billion	Telecom, oil, finance and investment

=== 2022 ===
2022
Name	Citizenship	Net worth (USD)	Sources of wealth
Aliko Dangote	Nigeria	13.9 billion	Cement, sugar
Abdulsamad Rabiu	Nigeria	6.7 billion	Oil
Mike Adenuga	Nigeria	5.7 billion	Telecom, oil

=== 2021 ===
2021
Name	Citizenship	Net worth (USD)	Sources of wealth
Abdul Samad Rabiu	Nigeria	7 billion	Cement production, sugar refining, and real estate
Mike Adenuga	Nigeria	6.7 billion	Telecommunication

=== 2020 ===
2020
Name	Citizenship	Net worth (USD)	Sources of wealth
Aliko Dangote	Nigeria	8.3 billion	Sugar, flour, cement, household consumables
Mike Adenuga	Nigeria	5.7 billion	Telecommunication, petroleum
Abdul Samad Rabiu	Nigeria	3.1 billion	Cement, sugar

=== 2019 ===
2019
World ranking	Name	Citizenship	Net worth (USD)	Sources of wealth
100	Aliko Dangote	Nigeria	10.3 billion	Sugar, flour, cement
365	Mike Adenuga	Nigeria	9.2 billion	Telecommunication, petroleum
156	Abdul Samad Rabiu	Nigeria	1.6 billion	Cement, sugar

=== 2018 ===
2018
World ranking	Name	Citizenship	Net worth (USD)	Sources of wealth
100	Aliko Dangote	Nigeria	14.1 billion	Cement, sugar, salt
365	Mike Adenuga	Nigeria	5.3 billion	Telecommunication, petroleum

=== 2017 ===
2017
World ranking	Name	Citizenship	Net worth (USD)	Sources of wealth
100	Aliko Dangote	Nigeria	12.2 billion	Cement, sugar, salt
250	Mike Adenuga	Nigeria	6.1 billion	Telecommunication, petroleum
1290	Folorunsho Alakija	Nigeria	1.61 billion	Fashion industry, oil

=== 2016 ===
2016
World ranking	Name	Citizenship	Net worth (USD)	Sources of wealth
51	Aliko Dangote	Nigeria	9.5 billion	Oil, sugar, cement
103	Mike Adenuga	Nigeria	5.2 billion	Telecommunication, petroleum
1011	Femi Otedola	Nigeria	1.85 billion	Petroleum
1121	Folorunsho Alakija	Nigeria	1.55 billion	Fashion industry, oil
1577	Abdul Samad Rabiu	Nigeria	1.1 billion	Foods

=== 2015 ===
2015
World ranking	Name	Citizenship	Net worth (USD)	Sources of wealth
67	Aliko Dangote	Nigeria	17.7 billion	Sugar, flour, cement
393	Mike Adenuga	Nigeria	4.2 billion	Telecommunication, petroleum
949	Folorunsho Alakija	Nigeria	2.0 billion	Fashion industry, oil
1741	Femi Otedola	Nigeria	1.0 billion	Petroleum
1741	Abdul Samad Rabiu	Nigeria	1.0 billion	Foods

=== 2014 ===
2014
Name	Citizenship	Net worth (USD)	Sources of wealth
Aliko Dangote	Nigeria	25 billion	Sugar, flour, cement
Mike Adenuga	Nigeria	4.6 billion	Telecommunication, petroleum
Folorunsho Alakija	Nigeria	2.5 billion	Fashion industry, oil
Abdul Samad Rabiu	Nigeria	2.5 billion	Foods

== See also ==
- Forbes list of billionaires
- List of countries by the number of billionaires
