= List of Finns by net worth =

This is a list of Finnish billionaires based on an annual assessment of wealth and assets compiled and published by Forbes magazine in 2023.

== 2023 Finns billionaires list ==
World ranking	Name	Citizenship	Net worth (USD)	Sources of wealth
679	Antti Herlin	Finland	4.1 billion	KONE
1516	Heikki Kyöstilä	Finland	2 billion	Planmeca
1575	Mika Anttonen	Finland	1.9 billion	St1
1725	Ilkka Herlin	Finland	1.7 billion	Kone
1804	Ilona Herlin	Finland	1.6 billion	Kone
2020	Antti Aarnio-Wihuri	Finland	1.4 billion	Wihuri Group
2133	Heikki Herlin	Finland	1.3 billion	Kone

== See also ==
- Forbes list of billionaires
- List of countries by the number of billionaires
