= Yasseen Mansour =

Egyptian businessman

- Born: 1961 or 1962 (age 63–64)
- Education: George Washington University
- Occupations: Part owner, Mansour Group
- Children: 4
- Relatives: Mohamed Mansour (brother); Youssef Mansour (brother)

Yasseen Mansour (Arabic: ياسين منصور; born 1961/1962) is an Egyptian billionaire businessman, part owner of the Mansour Group, and chairman of Palm Hills Developments. Mansour has multiple Credit Suisse accounts per Suisse Secrets. In 2011 he was cleared of corruption charges after paying 250 million Egyptian pounds to the authorities.

== Early life ==
Yasseen Mansour is one of five children of Loutfy Mansour (1909-1976), the founder of Mansour Group. Loutfy Mansour had four sons, Ismail, Youssef, Mohamed and Yasseen, and a daughter, Rawya. Two of his brothers are also billionaires, Mohamed Mansour and Youssef Mansour.

He earned a bachelor's degree from George Washington University.

== Career ==
In 1986, Mansour joined Mansour Motors Group. He later co-founded Mansour & Maghraby Investment Development (MMID), a 60:40 partnership between his family's Mansour Group, and his cousin, former Minister of Housing, Ahmed El-Maghraby's family business, the Maghraby Group, which together are the majority owner of the large EGX listed real estate developer Palm Hills Development Company PHDC.CA.

Mansour was found to have multiple Credit Suisse accounts per Suisse secrets. In 2011 Mansour was cleared of corruption charges after paying 250 million Egyptian pounds to the authorities. In September 2019, Forbes estimated his net worth at US$1.5 billion.

== Personal life ==
Mansour is married with four children and lives in Cairo.
