= List of Peruvians by net worth =

This is a list of Peruvian billionaires based on an annual assessment of wealth and assets compiled and published by Forbes magazine in 2023.

== 2023 Peruvian billionaires list ==
World Rank	Name	Citizenship	Net worth (USD)	Source of wealth
1905	Anne Marie See Pastor	Peru	1.5 billion	finance
1905	George Pastor	Peru	1.5 billion	finance
468	Carlos Rodríguez-Pastor	Peru	1.5 billion	finance
2540	Ana Maria Brescia Cafferata	Peru	1 billion	mining, banking

== See also ==
- The World's Billionaires
- List of countries by the number of billionaires
