= Cevital =

Largest private conglomerate in Algeria

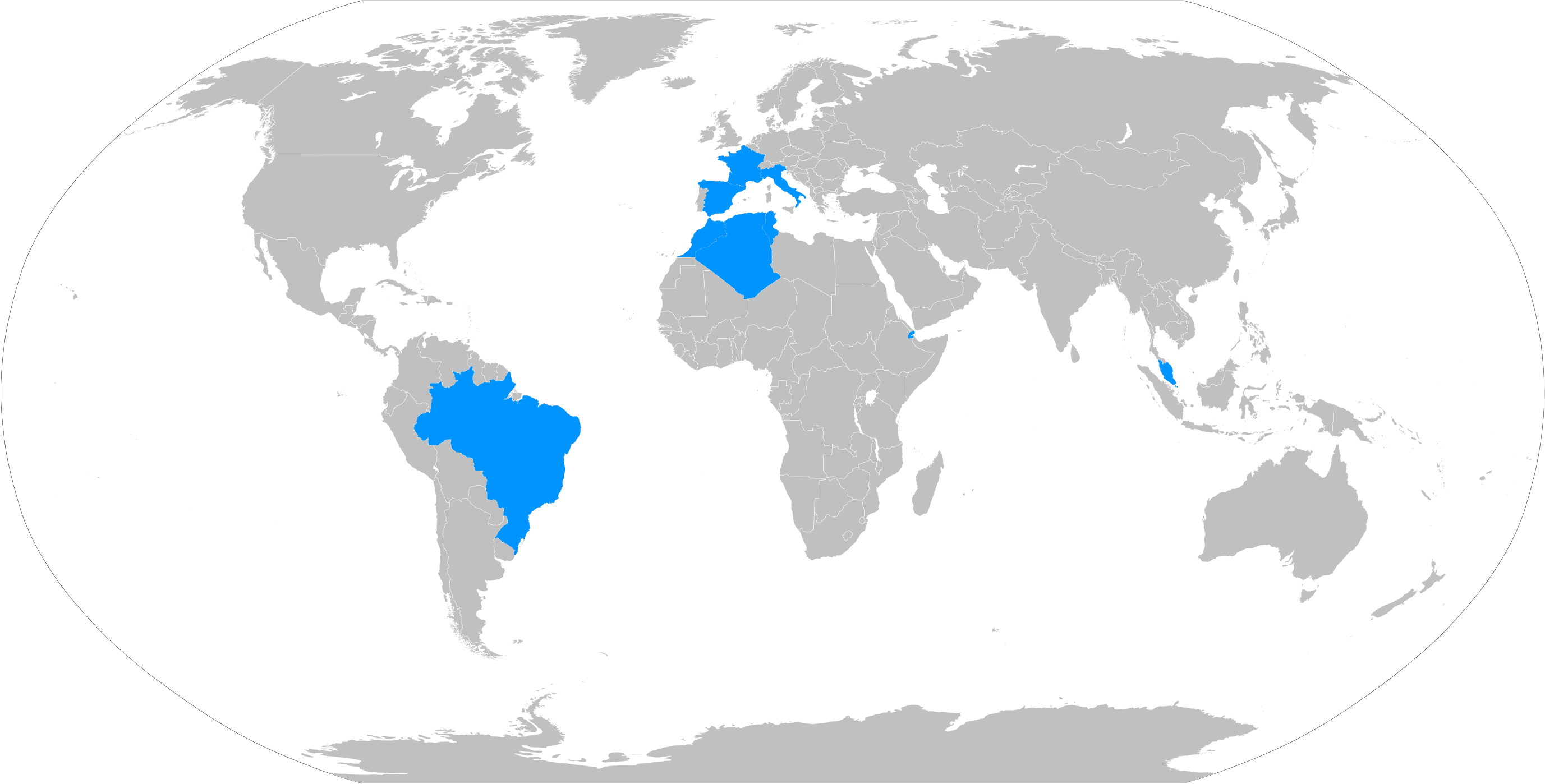
- International establishment of the Cevital group
- Type: Joint-stock company
- Traded as: Issad Rebrab
- Founded: 1998; 28 years ago
- Founder: Issad Rebrab
- Headquarters: Kouba, Algeria
- Products: Food processing; food distribution; glass production; home appliance
- Revenue: ▲US$ 3,260 millions (2013)
- Net income: ▲US$ 382 millions (2013)
- Number of employees: 18,000
- Subsidiaries: (See the list of subsidiaries and affiliates)
- Website: www.cevital.com

Former logo of the company (2002–2016).

Cevital is the largest private conglomerate in Algeria, with interests in the agri-food sector, retail, industry and services, created by Issad Rebrab. The company's headquarters are in Kouba, Algeria. Cevital is a founding member of the Desertec project. The company's earnings in 2009 were US$3,589 million.

== Subsidiaries and affiliates ==
Main subsidiaries and affiliate companies of Cevital include food processing, shopping centers, construction, automobile sales, and glass manufacturing:

=== Food processing industry ===
- Cevital Food Processing Industry

Created in 1998, Cevital Food Processing Industry (Cevital Agro-Industrie) consists of various production units such as: oil refinery, sugar refinery, margarine production unit, mineral water packaging unit, a unit for producing and packaging refreshing drinks, cannery, port silos as well as a terminal for port unloading. Cevital Food Processing Industry has permitted Algeria to go from the importation stage to the exportation one for oils, margarines and sugar.

Its products are sold in several countries, particularly in Europe, in the Maghreb, in the Middle East and in Western Africa.

Cevital Food Processing Industry is the biggest private complex in Algeria. Its production tools are divided as follows:

production facility	production capacity
An (sunflower and soybean) oil refinery	670,000 tons/year
A margarine factory	180,000 tons/year
A sugar refinery	2,000,000 tons/year
A unit of liquid sugar	210,000 tons (dry matter equivalent)/year
A unit of mineral water packaging: Lalla Khedidja	3,000,000 bottles/day
A unit of refreshing non-alcoholic drinks: Tchina	600,000 bottles/hour.
A tomato and fruit jam cannery	80 tons/day
Port Silos	182,000 tons

- Ceviagro

Created in 2004, Ceviagro is a firm of mass agricultural production, operating in the field of the production of arboreal plants, arboriculture, potato seeds, market gardening productions in greenhouses and in open country, as well as the marketing of fertilizers.

- Nolis

Created in 2000, Nolis-SPA (Joint Stock Company) is the subsidiary in charge of the maritime trade of the Group.

=== Automotive and services ===
- HMA

The Joint-stock Company Hyundai Motor Algeria, created in 1997, is a distributor of Hyundai Motor Company products, for the range of light vehicles, heavy goods vehicles, buses and commercial vehicles, and Hyundai Heavy Industries for public works equipment.

It comprises more than 45 distributing agents split over the whole national territory.

- COGETP

Created in 2008, the General Company of Public Works Equipment COGETP (Compagnie Générale des Équipements de Travaux Public) is the exclusive dealer of Volvo CE and SDLG (China) in Algeria. COGETP markets public works equipment, sells spare parts and ensures after-sales service conforming to European standards. The product range of Volvo public works equipment includes more than 50 models of mechanical diggers, loaders, grading machines, retro-loaders, finishers, compactors and articulated tip-up cars.

- ACTS

Created in 2004, ACTSpecialist (Associated Car & Truck Specialist) specializes in the marketing and maintenance of vehicles (commercial, industrial, public transportation and public works).

ACTSpecialist distinguishes itself from its rivals by the diversification of its areas of activities, particularly by the importation and marketing of industrial vehicles (trucks, buses, tractor-trailers and public works vehicles) and assembly in CKD of tractor-trailers of the brand RANDON, in the factory situated in L’Ârbaa, Wilaya of Blida.

A policy embodied in trade agreements with first rank suppliers: RANDON, SUMITOMO, CHETRA, NEOBUS, CAMC, LONKING.

- Public Works Equipment

Created in 2008, Cevital MTP (Public Works Equipment) specializes in the renting of the equipment of public works, transportation and construction. With a workforce of 131 people, Cevital MTP has 226 equipment units in its assets.

- Cevicar – Car Renting

As a result of a co-operation between Cevital Group and Hyundai, CEVICAR was established in 2007.

- Fiat Algeria
- Immobis

Created in 2006, Immobis-SPA (Joint Stock Company), operates in the domain of real estate as a project manager for projects being carried out across the national territory.

Industrial Sector:

Logistic tri-temperature platforms in Oran: 17,000 m^{2} of storage area.

Logistic tri-temperature platforms in Bouira: 75,000 m^{2} of storage area. Platforms of 5,000 m^{2} were planned.

Service Sector:

plans included 3 shopping centers of 16,000 m^{2} in Bouira, Ain Defla and Mostaganem; 4 shopping centers in Sidi Abdellah, Setif, Tlemcen and Bordj Bou; 3 Office towers and 2 hotel towers and apartment hotels in Algiers.

Housing Sector:

Luxurious accommodation in Hussein Dey, Cheraga, Sidi Abdellah (soon)

- Future Media

Created in 2006, FUTURE MEDIA is a company that specializes in multimedia communication, including graphic design and billposting.

=== Industry ===
- Samha

Launched in 2006, Joint-Stock Company SAMHA Home Appliance is the official and exclusive representative of the brand Samsung Electronics for electrical household products, and manufactures household appliances and audiovisual devices. At its factory in Setif, it employs more than 1800 workers and its product range includes refrigerators, air conditioners, washing machines and colored TV sets.

- MFG

Mediterranean Float Glass (MFG), created in 2007, is the biggest producer of flat glass in Africa, with a production capacity of 600 tons/day. Established in Larbaa, Wilaya of Blida, MFG launched a production line of laminated glass in 2009, with a production capacity of 400 tons/day, and a factory for processing glass products opened in October 2010.

- Cevital Minerals

Created in 2008, its role is to carry out the prospecting and the exploration of all mineral substances, to exploit these deposits and to treat the extracted substances. It now has eight mining titles between exploration and exploitation.

- Baticompos

Baticompos, a company of industrialized components, stemmed from the subsidiarization of the industrial group BATIMETAL. Acquired by the Cevital Group in 2007, it manufactures sandwich panels, false ceilings, veined metal sheets and shaped pieces.

It also makes other products such as Saharian Cabins (residence, offices, sanitary), drilling camps, modular constructions, bungalows, cold storage rooms and shelters for telecommunications equipment.

- Prainsa Cevico Algeria

Considered as an unprecedented experience in Algeria, the creation of CEVICO and the functioning of its factories has permitted the supply of the construction projects of Cevital Group with prefabricated concrete elements to accompany its goal of acquiring the structures in its development strategy. CEVICO holds a certificate of classification and professional qualification of category VIII.

=== Distribution ===
- Sierra Cevital

Created in 2011, Sierra Cevital is a joint-venture established between the Cevital Group and Sonae Sierra. It specializes in the development and management of shopping centers.

- Numilog

Created in 2007, Numilog provides global logistic services including land transportation, storage and stock management, packaging, co-packing, labeling, as well as varied complementary services (customs transit). Numilog is a Cevital Group subsidiary with resources to respond to enterprises logistics and transportation needs. Numilog is a key player in the logistic and supply chain and can assist organizations in activities optimization, relying on world-class infrastructure.

- Numidis

Created in 2006, Numidis specializes in wide distribution. It has set for itself the objective of developing a chain of supermarkets and hypermarkets under the brand names Unocity and Uno.

== Acquisitions ==
Cevital has made the following acquisitions:

Year	Acquisition	Industry
2013	OXXO (France)	Premade window and door systems
2013	ALAS (Spain)	window and door aluminum frames
2014	FagorBrandt Home Appliances	European Operations - France
2014	Lucchini Metal Foundry, Steel Mill and Port Operations	European Operations - Piombino Italy
