= Arnout Schuijff =

Dutch entrepreneur (born 1967)

- Born: 1967 (age 58–59)
- Known for: Co-founder and former CTO, Adyen
- Title: CEO, Tebi

Arnout Schuijff (born 1967) is a Dutch billionaire Internet entrepreneur, and the co-founder and former chief technology officer (CTO) of Adyen.

From 1997 to 2004, Schuijff was systems architect at Bibit Global Payment Services.

In 2006, Schuijff co-founded Adyen.

In June 2018, he became a billionaire after Adyen's IPO, based on his 6.4% stake in the company. Co-founder and CEO Pieter van der Does has a 4.8% stake worth $800 million, and his brother, Joost Schuijff, has a stake worth $500 million.

As of 2021, Arnout is ranked #859 on the Forbes list of billionaires and worth about US$3.5 billion.

After leaving Adyen in 2020, Schuijff co-founded the Amsterdam-based payments startup Tebi, where he is the chief executive. The venture-backed company's aims to replace multiple point reservations, QR ordering, payment processing, with a single comprehensive platform via a consumer app.

In May 2024, it was announced that Arnout joined as the first investor in the Amsterdam-based ticket startup WeTicket.

Arnout is married, and lives in Amsterdam, Netherlands.
