= Mansour Group =

Egyptian multinational conglomerate

- Native name: مجموعة منصور
- Type: Private
- Industry: Conglomerate
- Founded: 1952
- Founder: Loutfy Mansour
- Headquarters: Cairo, Egypt
- Key people: Mohamed Mansour; Yasseen Mansour; Youssef Mansour
- Products: Energy, automotive, consumer durables, finance, retail, construction, tourism, shipping, defence, information technology, investment, food
- Revenue: US$6.0 Billion (2016)
- Number of employees: 60,000

The Mansour Group is an Egyptian multinational conglomerate, with operations across the globe. It is the second largest company in Egypt by revenue. It is the largest General Motors dealer in the world, and the fifth largest distributor of Caterpillar Inc. products globally. It also has contracts in Egypt to represent a range of international brands, including McDonald's, Chevrolet, Red Bull, UPS and Imperial Brands. It operates Egypt’s largest supermarket chain, Metro Markets, and the Kheir Zaman discount chain. The company also has a private investment firm, Man Capital, based in London.

The company reported 2016 revenues of US$6.0 Billion, with 60,000 employees and operations in 120 countries.

The company is privately held and managed by the Mansour brothers Mohamed, Youssef and Yasseen, who are board members.

== History ==
The Mansour Group started as a cotton business founded in 1952 by Loutfy Mansour, one of the first Egyptians to graduate from Cambridge. The business was nationalized by President Gamal Abdel Nasser in the 1960s, forcing Mansour to Sudan and eventually Switzerland, where he continued to work in the cotton business. His sons attended school in the United States while he was working. Eventually, when Egypt returned to a market economy under President Anwar Sadat and his Infitah policy in the early 1970s, Mansour and his sons were able to return.

At that time, General Motors was looking for Egyptian partners to help them expand, and were connected with the Mansour family. The family set up a GM dealership and obtained Egyptian sales rights in 1975. The company was called Al-Mansour Automotive. In 1984, GM opened its first factory in Egypt, and in 1985 the first GM vehicle was produced in the country. Al-Mansour Automotive gained rights to sell GM cars in Africa, and eventually became the largest GM dealership in the world.

In 1977, the Mansour Group secured rights to sell and distribute Caterpillar digging equipment in Egypt. The Mantrac subsidiary was formed to manage the Caterpillar business, and eventually secured Caterpillar rights to Sub-Saharan Africa, Russia and Iraq. As of 2015, Mantrac was the fifth largest Caterpillar dealer in the world.

In 1992, the Mansour Group created an autonomous company, Mansour Financial, formally the Al-Mansour Holding Company for Financial Investments (MHCFI) to manage a license agreement with Philip Morris International (PMI) to produce and distribute PMI’s brands in Egypt. The Al-Mansour International Distribution Company (AMIDC) was created underneath Mansour Financial to manage the tobacco business. When the Philip Morris partnership ended in 2014, AMIDC partnered with Imperial Brands, then called Imperial Tobacco.

Manfoods was created in 1994 to manage McDonald's franchises in Egypt.

In 2000, the company launched Metro Markets, the first Egyptian-owned supermarket chain.

The company launched its first discount store in 2006, called Kheir Zaman, which translates to "The Good Old Days".

In 2010, the Mansour Group founded Man Capital (aka Mancap), a private investment subsidiary. The family transferred its entire net worth to the new standalone entity incorporated in London.

In September 2022, the group was listed by Forbes in the Middle East's Top 100 Arab Family Businesses, ranking second.

Following an investigation by HM Revenue and Customs into Mansour Group subsidiary Unatrac in February 2023, the parent company agreed to a multimillion-pound tax settlement with the British government.

== Subsidiaries ==
=== Man Capital ===
Man Capital (a.k.a. 'Mancap'), the Mansour Group's private investment subsidiary, is based in London and is run by Loutfy Mansour, son of Mohamed Mansour. The company consists of 10 employees across the US, Europe and Asia, and averages about 2 deals a year. Notable investments include marine logistics firm Vanguard (formerly OTS Logistics), Millennium Offshore Services, which provides services to the offshore oil and gas industry and is now known as Seafox, and Nigerian telecoms infrastructure provider IHS Towers. The subsidiary was also an early investor in technology companies including Facebook, Twitter, Spotify and Uber.

=== Manfoods ===
Manfoods was founded in 1994 when McDonald's franchised their first restaurants in Egypt to the Mansour Group. Manfoods owns McDonald's Egypt, and employs over 3,000 people.

=== Mansour Auto ===
Mansour Auto, also known as Al-Mansour Automotive, imports and sells General Motors (GM) automobiles, and is the sole distributor for MG Motor in Egypt. It is the largest GM dealership in the world.

=== Mansour Financial ===
Mansour Financial, also known as Al-Mansour Holding Company for Financial Investments, manages the tobacco partnership with Imperial Brands. The company also private labels consumer goods such as Sunshine Tuna, Labanita and Belhana dairy products and Hayat Natural drinking water. Mansour Financial also runs the Metro Market and Kheir Zaman supermarket chains.

=== Mantrac Group ===
Mantrac was created by the Mansour Group in 1977 as the sole authorised dealer for Caterpillar products in Egypt. The group has since continued to expand globally, and as of 2021, was active in more than 12 countries.

=== MMID ===
El Mansour & El Maghraby Investment and Development Company (MMID) manages a diverse investment portfolio of financial institutions, industrial projects, real estate, information technology, telecom, tourism, and media and entertainment. MMID is a major shareholder in Crédit Agricole Egypt, and in Palm Hills Developments, Egypt’s second largest real estate developer, which as of October 2015 was working on 14 projects covering 13 million square meters.

=== ManSports ===
In 2021, the Mansour Group invested $120 million in a takeover of Right to Dream Academy and announced it was forming a new entity, ManSports.
