= List of South Asian people by net worth =

This is a list of the 20 richest people in South Asia (India, Pakistan, Bangladesh, Sri Lanka, Nepal, Bhutan) based on the 2024 Forbes Billionaires List.

== 2024 ==
South Asia Rank	World Rank	Name	Net Worth (USD)	Citizenship	Residence	Source(s) of Wealth
1	9	Mukesh Ambani	116 billion	(India)	Mumbai	Reliance Industries
2	17	Gautam Adani	84 billion	(India)	Gujarat	Adani Group
3	39	Shiv Nadar	36.9 billion	(India)	Delhi	HCL Technologies
4	46	Savitri Jindal & Family	33.5 billion	(India)	Tinsukia	JSW Group
5	69	Dilip Shanghvi	26.7 billion	(India)	Mumbai	Sun Pharmaceutical Industries Ltd
6	90	Cyrus Poonawalla	21.3 billion	(India)	Mumbai	Serum Institute of India
7	92	Kushal Pal Singh	20.9 billion	(India)	Gurgaon	DLF Limited
8	98	Kumar Mangalam Birla	19.7 billion	(India)	Mumbai	Aditya Birla Group
9	107	Radhakishan Damani	17.6 billion	(India)	Mumbai	DMart
10	113	Lakshmi Mittal	16.4 billion	(India)	London	ArcelorMittal
11	115	Ravi Jaipuria	16.2 billion	(India)	Delhi	Varun Beverages
12	148	Uday Kotak	13.3 billion	(India)	Mumbai	Kotak Securities
13	162	Shahid Khan	12.2 billion	(Pakistan) (United States)	Naples, Florida	All Elite Wrestling (AEW), Jacksonville Jaguars, Fulham F.C.
14	165	Azim Premji	12 billion	(India)	Bengaluru	Wipro
15	213	Mangal Prabhat Lodha	10.4 billion	(India)	Mumbai	Lodha Group
16	249	Pankaj Patel	9.5 billion	(India)	Ahmedabad	Zydus Lifesciences
17	266	Sunil Bharti Mittal	9.2 billion	(India)	Delhi	Bharti Enterprises
18	298	Rekha Jhunjhunwala	8.5 billion	(India)	Mumbai	Investments
19	334	Hasmukh Chudgar & Family	7.7 billion	(India)	Ahmedabad	Intas Pharmaceuticals
20	-	M. A. Yusuff Ali	7.4 billion	(India)	Dubai	LuLu Group International
21	403	Benu Gopal Bangur	6.8 billion	(India)	Kolkata	Shree Cement
22	-	Gopikishan Shivkishan Damani	6.5 billion	(India)	Mumbai	DMart
