= List of Portuguese by net worth =

This is a list of the wealthiest Portuguese people by net worth. It is primarily based on data from The World's Billionaires publication by Forbes magazine, as well as other sources.

== List of wealthiest people ==
World rank (year)	Name	Citizenship	Net worth (USD)	Source of wealth	Reference
113th (in 2020)	Roman Abramovich	Portugal; Russia; Israel	$14.5 billion	Owner of Millhouse Capital	
222nd (in 2020)	Patrick Drahi	Portugal; Morocco; France	$9 billion	Founder of Altice and largest shareholder in Sotheby's	
225th (in 2020)	Giancarlo Moreira Salles	Portugal Brazil	$8.9 billion	Attorney, CFO of Itaú Unibanco and largest shareholder in Campari Group, JAB Holding Company	
385th (in 2017)	Américo Amorim	Portugal	$4.4 billion	Owner of Corticeira Amorim and largest shareholder in Galp Energia	
745th (in 2017)	Alexandre Soares dos Santos	Portugal	$2.7 billion	Owner of Jerónimo Martins	
973rd (in 2017)	Demetrio Carceller Coll	Portugal	$2.1 billion	Owner of Sacyr, Ebro Foods, and Damm Brewery	
677th (in 2008)	José Berardo	Portugal	$1.8 billion	Gold mining and art collection	
1,376th (in 2010)	Belmiro de Azevedo	Portugal	$1.5 billion	Owner of Sonae	
Unlisted	Cristiano Ronaldo	Portugal	$1.5 billion	Football contracts, endorsement deals, business investments	
Unlisted	José Neves	Portugal	$1.4 billion	Founder and owner of Farfetch	
Unlisted	Pedro Queiroz Pereira	Portugal	$1.3 billion	Owner of Semapa	
Unlisted	Manuel and Rita Violas	Portugal	$960 million	Owner of Super Bock Group	
Unlisted	Luís Vicente	Portugal	$888 million	Owner of Grupo Luís Vicente and Nuvi Group	
Unlisted	João Pereira Coutinho	Portugal	$698 million	Owner of AR Telecom	
Unlisted	Fernando Pinho Teixeira	Portugal	$661 million	Owner of Grupo Ferpinta	
Unlisted	Rui Nabeiro	Portugal	$421 million	Owner of Delta Cafés	

== See also ==
- The World's Billionaires
- List of countries by the number of billionaires
