= Pieter van der Does (businessman) =

Dutch Internet entrepreneur (born 1969)

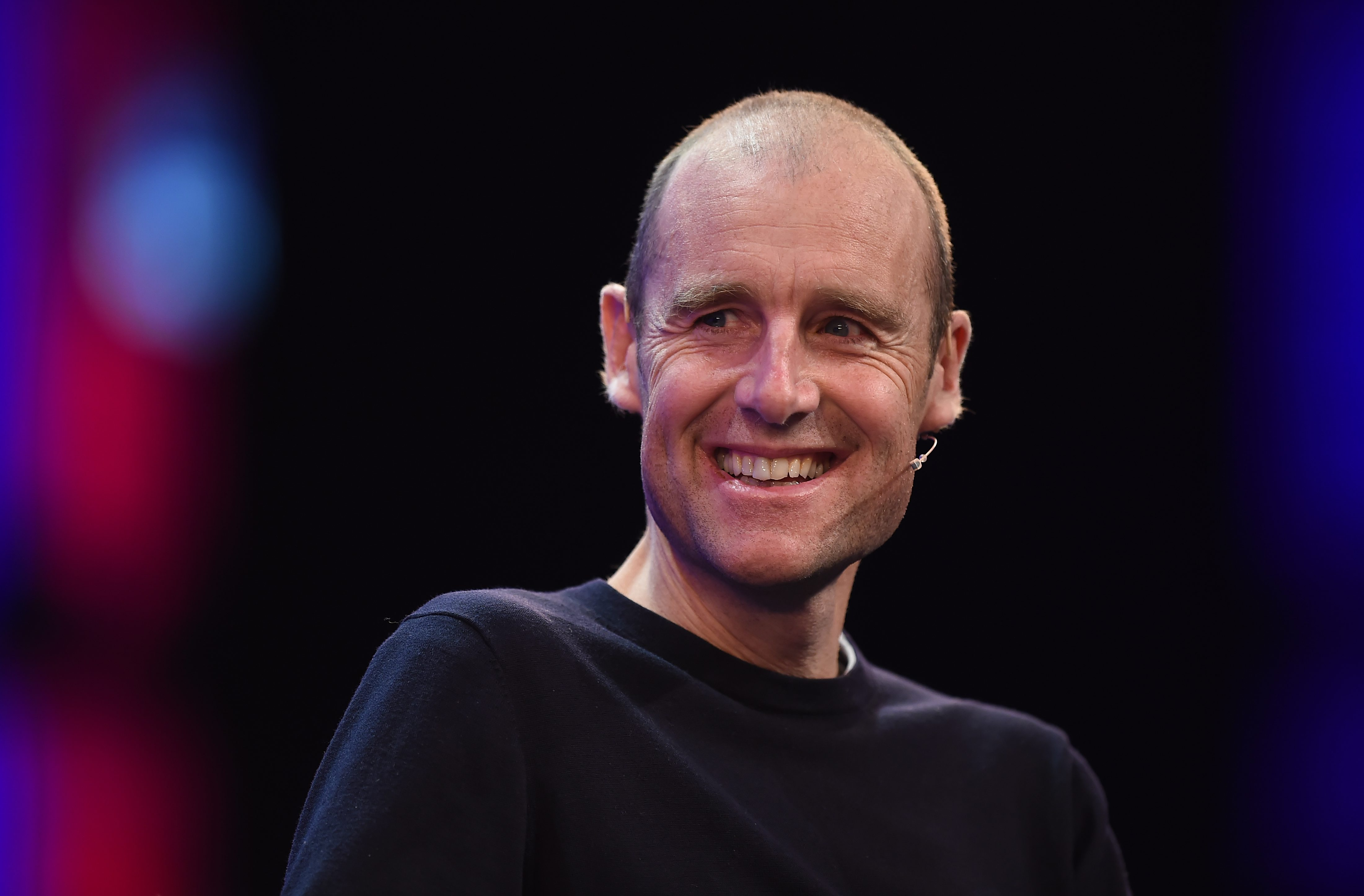
- Van der Does in 2015
- Born: 1969 (age 56–57); Amstelveen, Netherlands
- Education: University of Amsterdam
- Occupation: Internet entrepreneur
- Known for: Co-founder and CEO, Adyen
- Children: 2

Pieter van der Does (born 1969) is a Dutch billionaire Internet entrepreneur, and the co-founder and chief executive officer (CEO) of Adyen. As of September 2024, his net worth was estimated at US$1.8 billion, and he owns 3% of the company.

== Early life ==
Van der Does was born in 1969 in Amstelveen, Netherlands. Between 1988 and 1995, he studied economics in Clark University, University of Amsterdam, and Paris 1 Panthéon-Sorbonne University, taking breaks mountaineering in between. He earned a master's degree in economics from the University of Amsterdam.

== Career ==
Van der Does started his career at ING Netherlands as an operational manager in 1995, before leaving for Elsevier a year later.

In 1999, Van der Does co-founded Bibit Global Payment Services, a payments startup. He was chief commerce officer at Bibit until it was bought by Royal Bank of Scotland in 2004, after which he was a board member until 2006.

In 2006, van der Does co-founded Adyen (with Arnout Schuijff), a platform for online stores to process electronic payments. Its clients came to include Spotify, Facebook, Netflix, and eBay. In June 2018, after Adyen's initial public offering, the company rose to a valuation of €13.4 billion (US$15.8 billion).

In 2020, van der Does was listed for the first time in the Forbes Billionaire list.

== Personal life ==
Van der Does is married, and lives in Amsterdam, Netherlands. They have a son and a daughter.
