= List of Belgians by net worth =

This is a list of Belgian Billionaires based on an annual assessment of wealth and assets compiled and published by Forbes magazine in 2024.

== 2024 Belgian billionaires list ==
Global ranking	Name	Citizenship	Net worth (USD)	Sources of wealth
404	Eric Wittouck	Belgium	9.0 billion	Raffinerie Tirlemontoise
843	Nicolas D'Ieteren	Belgium	5.03 billion	D'leteren
836	Fernand Huts	Belgium	5.04 billion	Katoen Natie
949	Alexandre Van Damme	Belgium	3.4 billion	Jupiler
991	Catheline Perier D'Ieteren	Belgium	3.3 billion	D'Ieteren
991	Gérald Frère	Belgium	3.3 billion	Groupe Bruxelles Lambert
1062	Ségolène Gallienne	Belgium	3.1 billion	Groupe Bruxelles Lambert
1104	Theo Roussis & Family	Belgium	3 billion	Ravago
1496	Pierre van der Mersch	Belgium	2.2 billion	Brederode
1545	Fabien Pinckaers	Belgium	2.1 billion	Odoo

== See also ==
- The World's Billionaires
- List of countries by the number of billionaires
