= Abdul Samad Rabiu =

Nigerian businessman (born 1960)

- Born: 4 August 1960 (age 66); Kano, Northern Region, Colonial Nigeria (now in Kano State)
- Occupation: Businessman
- Spouse: Hannatu Musawa (divorced)
- Father: Isyaku Rabiu
- Relatives: Kabiru Isyaku Rabiu, Nafiu Isyaku Rabiu
- Honours: Commander of the Order of the Federal Republic; Commander of the Order of the Niger

Abdul Samad Isyaku Rabiu CFR CON GCON (born 4 August 1960) is a Nigerian businessman and philanthropist. As of 2026, he is one of the richest Africans with an estimated net worth of over US$14 billion according to Forbes & Bloomberg Billionaires Index. His late father, Isyaku Rabiu, was one of Nigeria's foremost industrialists in the 1970s and 1980s. Abdul Samad is the founder and chairman of BUA Group, a Nigerian conglomerate concentrating on manufacturing, infrastructure and agriculture producing a revenue in excess of $2.6 billion. He is also the Chairman of the publicly listed BUA Cement Plc and BUA Foods. He is a former chairman of the Nigerian Bank of Industry (BOI).

On July 2020, Forbes estimated Rabiu's wealth at $11.2 billion, putting him 284th in the global billionaire's club.

== Early life ==
Abdul Samad Rabiu was born and raised in Kano in the north-western part of Nigeria and is a Hausa man. He attended Federal Government college Kano. He visited Capital University in Columbus, Ohio, US and later returned to Nigeria to oversee the family business. This was when his father Isyaku Rabiu was being detained by the administration of General Muhammadu Buhari for allegedly not paying rice import duties.

== Business ==
Abdul Samad Rabiu established BUA International Limited in 1988 for the sole purpose of commodity trading. The company imported rice, edible oil, flour, and iron and steel.

In 1990, the government, which owned Delta Steel Company, contracted with BUA to supply its raw materials in exchange for finished products. This provided a much-needed windfall for the young company. BUA expanded further into steel, producing billets, importing iron ore, and constructing multiple rolling mills in Nigeria.

Years later, BUA acquired Nigerian Oil Mills Limited, the largest edible oil processing company in Nigeria. In 2005 BUA started two flour-milling plants, in Lagos and in Kano. By 2008, BUA had broken an eight-year monopoly in the Nigerian sugar industry by commissioning the second largest sugar refinery in sub-Saharan Africa. In 2009 the company went on to acquire a controlling stake in a publicly listed Cement Company in Northern Nigeria and began to construct a $900 million cement plant in Edo State, completing it in early 2015.

== Philanthropy ==
Abdul Samad Rabiu uses the BUA Foundation for his philanthropic activities. These include the construction of 7,000-square-meter paediatric ward at the Aminu Kano Teaching Hospital and the construction of the Centre for Islamic Studies at Bayero University Kano amongst several others. In 2021, Abdul Samad set up the Abdul Samad Rabiu Initiative for Africa (ASR Africa) which he also chairs and through which he commits $100 million annually to strategic social investments in health, education, and infrastructure across Nigeria and Africa.

== Personal life ==
Aliyu Rabiu was married to Hannatu Musawa. He has only four children. They are Khadija Cookie Rabiu, Isyaku Khalifa Rabiu, Junaid Rabiu, and Rania Rabiu. He has several siblings including Nafiu Rabiu and Rabiu Rabiu, the chairman of IRS Airlines.

== Awards ==
In October 2022, a Nigerian national honor of Order of the Federal Republic (CFR) was conferred on him by President Muhammadu Buhari. He also holds the Commander of the Order of the Niger national honor in Nigeria as well as the Grand Commander of the Order of Merit of Niger (GCON) Honour in Niger Republic.

== Life Blessing ==
on the 2 November 2026, Abdulsamad in company of President Bola Ahmed Tinubu entered the Holy Ka'aba along side other delegations.
