= Issad Rebrab =

Algerian businessman and billionaire

Issad Rebrab يسعد ربراب
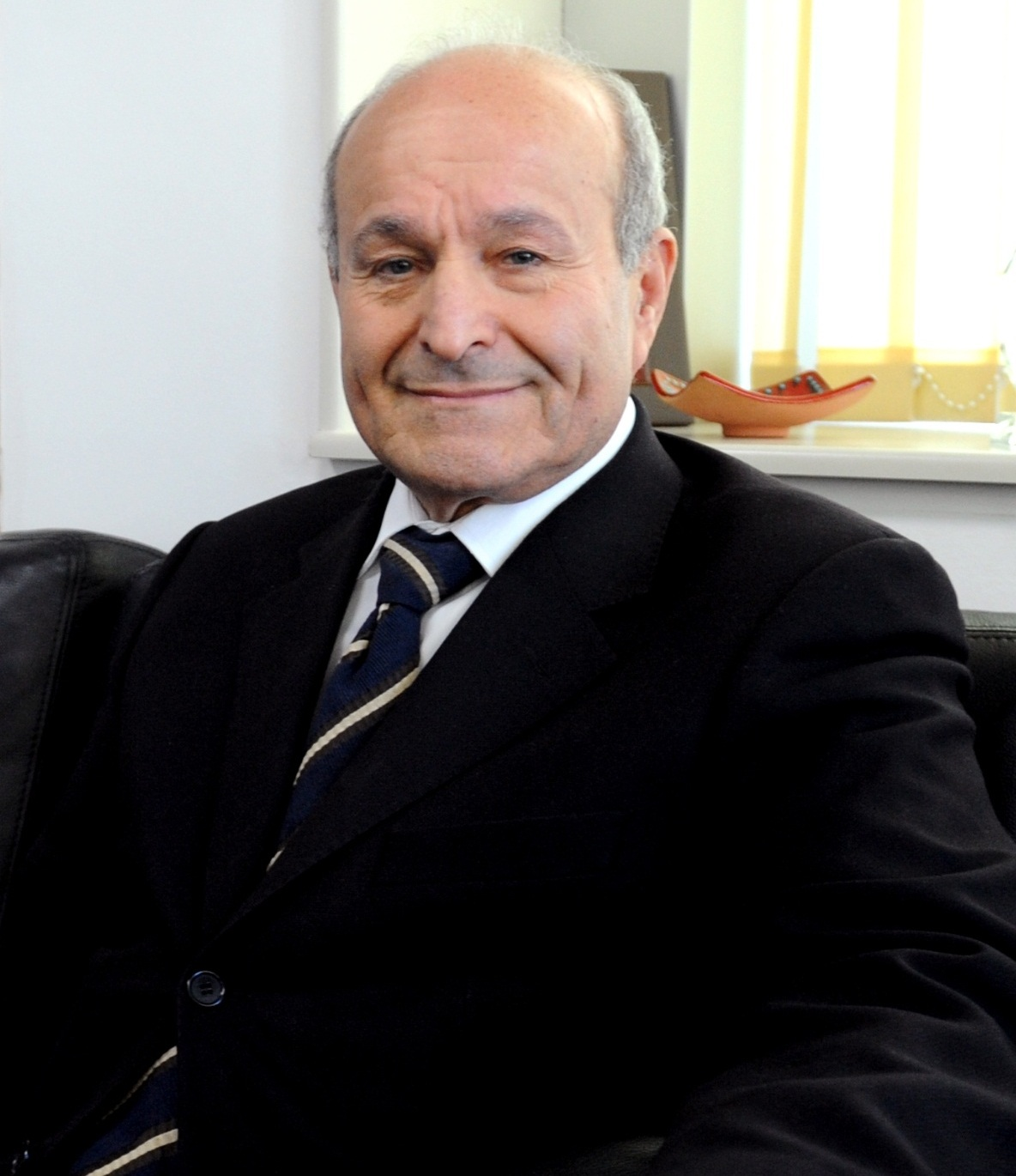
- Born: May 27, 1944 (age 82); Tagumount-Azzouz village, Tizi Ouzou, Algeria
- Occupation: Businessman
- Known for: CEO of Cevital
- Children: 5
- Website: www.cevital.com

Issad Rebrab (Arabic: يسعد ربراب; born 1944) is an Algerian billionaire businessman, CEO of the Cevital industrial group, the largest private company in Algeria, active in steel, food, agribusiness and electronics. In 2019, he was sentenced to six months for tax, banking and customs offenses.

== Early life ==
After graduating from a professional school, Rebrab taught accounting and commercial law. He soon left teaching, and started his own accounting firm.

== Career ==
His industrial career started in 1971, when one of his clients proposed he take shares in a metallurgical construction company. He took 20% of the shares in Sotecom. After that, he created other companies in the steel industry: Profilor in 1975 and Metal Sider in 1988.

In 1995, his main installations were destroyed in a terrorist attack. After he recognized the risks of staying, Rebrab decided to leave Algeria. He came back in 1998 with Cevital, the biggest group in agricultural business, which later became the largest private Algerian company. Cevital owns one of the largest sugar refineries in the world, with the capacity to produce 2 million tons a year.

In 2016, Rebrab acquired El Khabar media group, for $45 million. This was his second investment into media, as he owned the French-Algerian daily paper Liberte. The paper was subsequently closed by him in April 2022.

On April 22, 2019, Rebrab was incarcerated at the prison of El Harrach on the public prosecutor's orders, after his arrest as part of a corruption probe. He was released on January 1, 2020, after having been sentenced to six months for tax, banking and customs offenses, and having been in custody for longer than his eventual sentence. He was also fined 1.383 billion dinars (around $11.6 million or €10.3 million at the time).

On May 27, 2023, after a court decision, the justice prohibits Issad Rebrab from any intention of exercising in commerce.

== Personal life ==
Rebrab is married, and has five children.
