= Adyen =

Dutch financial services company

Adyen N.V.
- Type: Naamloze vennootschap
- Traded as: Euronext Amsterdam: ADYEN; AEX component
- ISIN: NL0012969182; US00783V1044
- Industry: Payment processor, technology, e-commerce, point of sale
- Founded: 2006; 20 years ago
- Founders: Arnout Schuijff; Pieter van der Does
- Headquarters: Amsterdam, Netherlands
- Key people: Pieter van der Does (CEO)
- Services: Payment service provider, gateway, risk management, local acquiring, point of sale, issuing
- Revenue: ▲€1.996 billion (2024)
- Net income: ▲€925 million (2024)
- Total assets: ▲€11.425 billion (2024)
- Total equity: ▲€4.232 billion (2024)
- Number of employees: 4,345 (2024)
- Website: adyen.com

Adyen is a Dutch payment company with the status of an acquiring bank that allows businesses to accept e-commerce, mobile, and point-of-sale payments. It is listed on the stock exchange Euronext Amsterdam.

Adyen offers merchants online services to accept electronic payments. The technology platform acts as a payment gateway and a payment service provider.

== History ==
Adyen was founded in 2006 by Pieter van der Does, the current Co-CEO, and Arnout Schuijff. Headquartered in Amsterdam, the company employs over 4,300 people in offices in twenty-three countries.

In 2012, Adyen started to expand globally, opening its offices in San Francisco, Paris, and London. In the same year, it obtained its pan-European acquiring license.

In 2015, Adyen achieved a valuation of $2.3 billion, making it the sixth-largest European unicorn.

In 2016, it obtained an acquiring license in Brazil through a BIN sponsorship.

In 2017, the company was granted a European banking license, which gave it the status of an acquiring bank. It also obtained acquiring licenses in Singapore, Hong Kong, Australia, and New Zealand.

In 2018, the company announced that it would be listing its shares publicly in Amsterdam. The IPO took place on 13 June 2018. Following this, the company has maintained a high growth trajectory, supported by expansion with existing customers and geographical diversification.

In 2019, Adyen opened new offices in Tokyo and Mumbai, and expanded its payment offering in Africa. In the same year, it launched Adyen Issuing, a virtual and physical card-issuing business to complement payments services to merchants.

In 2020, the company benefited from an accelerated digitalization of global ecommerce in the online retail segment, which compensated for the declining travel volumes in enterprises due to the COVID-19 pandemic. It launched mobile Android POS devices worldwide in the second half of the year. In addition, it opened a new office in Dubai, expanding its offering in the Middle East.

In July 2026, Adyen completed its acquisitions of the loyalty and promotions software company Talon.One and the enterprise billing platform Orb, after receiving the required regulatory approvals. The transactions, announced in April and June 2026, were the first acquisitions in the company's history. Following the closings, Adyen began integrating Talon.One's promotions platform and Orb's billing technology into its platform.

In the same press update, Adyen announced two significant changes to its leadership team. Gayathri Rajan, former Global Head of Product was appointed Chief Product Officer. Hwa Tsao, currently Senior Vice President of Group Finance, will assume the role of full-time interim CFO effective September 1, 2026, following the announced departure of CFO Ethan Tandowsky on August 31, 2026.

== Growth ==
The company has been profitable since 2011. In December 2014, the company announced a funding round of $250 million led by growth equity firm General Atlantic, joined by existing investors Temasek Holdings, Index Ventures, and Felicis Ventures.

On January 31, 2018, eBay announced that it had signed an agreement with Adyen to become its primary payments processing partner. eBay began intermediation on a small scale in North America starting in the second half of 2018, expanding in 2019 under the terms of the operating agreement with PayPal. In 2021, eBay transitioned a majority of its marketplace customers to Adyen.

In 2022, the company exceeded €1.3 billion in revenue.

In 2024, Adyen partnered with BILL, a leading financial operations platform for small and midsize businesses.

The platform has also been selected by DICK'S Sporting Goods, Vietnam Airlines, and the e-commerce platform Temu, unifying and standardizing payments infrastructure across online, in-store and in-app experiences.

In the third quarter of 2025, the company reported net revenue of €598.4 million, equating to a 20% year-on-year increase driven by continued wallet share expansion from existing customers.

In 2025, the company reported a record $43 billion in payments processed through the platform over the Black Friday/Cyber Monday weekend.

In 2025, Adyen announced the launch of Adyen Capital Canada, offering embedded funding to Canadian businesses, supporting their extension of short-term loans to small and medium-sized enterprises.

Products and advancements

Adyen has expanded its core business beyond payment processing into becoming a full-stack financial technology platform with the addition of financial products and services. This strategy includes developing Unified Commerce solutions to merge online and in-store payments. The company also offers a suite of Embedded Financial Products (EFPs), including Capital (business financing), Accounts (business banking), and Issuing (card creation).

== See also ==
- List of banks in the Netherlands
