= MeTL Group =

Tanzanian conglomerate

- Industry: Conglomerate
- Founded: 1970s
- Founder: Gulamabbas Dewji
- Headquarters: Dar es Salaam, Tanzania
- Area served: Sub-Saharan Africa
- Key people: Mohammed Dewji (CEO and President)
- Products: Diversified
- Revenue: US$2 billion) (2022)
- Owner: Dewji family
- Number of employees: 38,000 (2022)
- Website: Company Website

The MeTL Group (Mohammed Enterprises Tanzania Limited) is a Tanzanian family-owned conglomerate and one of the country's largest companies. Headquartered in Dar es Salaam, it operates in at least 11 African countries. Its business spans diverse sectors, including agriculture, manufacturing (especially food and consumer goods), trading, energy, real estate, logistics, and financial services, and its products are marketed under the “Mo” brand. By the 2020s MeTL employed tens of thousands of people and generated annual revenues of US$2 billion. MeTL's operations are estimated to contribute roughly 3.5 percent of Tanzania's GDP, making it a major force in the national economy.

== History ==
MeTL began in the 1970s as a small family trading business. It was founded by Gulamabbas Dewji (Mohammed Dewji's father) in Dar es Salaam, originally importing and distributing consumer goods. Mohammed “Mo” Dewji joined the business after graduating in 1998 and became CEO and President by 2005. Under his leadership the company pursued an aggressive expansion strategy. In the 2000s the Tanzanian government privatized many state-owned enterprises, and Dewji's MeTL acquired several underperforming firms at low cost and turned them into profitable units. To support local manufacturing, MeTL built factories to process raw inputs – for example installing a palm-oil refinery and a soap plant to replace previous imports.

Over the next two decades MeTL diversified its operations. Revenues grew from about $26 million in 1999 to over $1.5 billion by the mid-2010s. Along the way the group acquired and built factories in textiles (e.g. Morogoro and Musoma mills), edible oils, beverages (including its own Mo Cola soft drink), flour milling, and other consumer-goods sectors. By 2011 the group comprised about 25 companies across 11 sectors (beverages, edible oils, soaps, agriculture/processing, textiles, energy and petroleum, financial services, mobile telephony, infrastructure, real estate, transport/logistics and trading). By that time it employed over 24,000 people and (by one estimate) contributed about 2.5% of Tanzanian GDP.

In the 2010s and early 2020s, MeTL continued to grow. It remained privately owned by the Dewji family (with Mohammed Dewji as principal owner and CEO and his father as chairman). The company steadily expanded its workforce (reaching roughly 38,000 people by the early 2020s) and opened offices or operations in neighboring countries. For example, in 2022 Dewji announced plans to invest $250 million over two-to-three years to add beverage factories and boost sisal fiber production. In 2023, he announced a further $100 million investment by MeTL in four Rwandan agribusiness ventures (including edible oil, soaps, grain milling and beverages). At that time MeTL reported operations in eleven African nations and annual revenues exceeding $2 billion. The group also launched plans to grow its agricultural exports globally, including a proposed spin-off or IPO of its agribusiness subsidiary valued around $4 billion.

== Services and products ==
MeTL is a highly diversified conglomerate. Its core businesses include:

- Agriculture and Agri-processing: MeTL grows and processes crops. It operates flour mills for maize, wheat and rice; edible-oil refineries (e.g. crude palm oil); sugar refining; and cashew nut processing. The group supplies staples and animal feeds, and exports products like cereals and processed cashews. (For example, MeTL has exported processed cashews to South Africa and gray textiles to DRC and Mozambique).
- Food and Consumer Goods Manufacturing: The company produces a wide range of household products under its “Mo” brand. This includes flour and cereals, edible oils, cooking fat, soaps and detergents, beverages (such as Mo Cola and bottled water), grain-based foods, and snack foods. It also manufactures textiles (cotton and sisal fabrics) and garments. In 2017 MeTL produced goods in 21 different categories, outcompeting many international brands in Tanzania. CEO Dewji notes that “most Tanzanian households have at one time or another consumed a MeTL product”
- Logistics and Trading: MeTL maintains an extensive distribution network. It owns a fleet of over 2,000 vehicles and operates warehouses and sales outlets countrywide. Through its trading divisions, MeTL imports and distributes large volumes of commodities and consumer goods, reportedly over 500,000 tonnes annually, including rice, sugar, cement, fertilizers, and packaged foods. It also provides transport services (for goods exports) across East Africa. The group's trading arm handles over 200 product lines under its umbrella.
- Financial and Business Services: MeTL has interests in finance and insurance. Its microinsurance arm (“Mo Assurance”) has introduced low-cost life and health policies for Tanzanians. It has also pursued microfinance and banking (Dewji has sought a banking license).
- Energy and Petroleum: Through subsidiaries like Star Oil (T) Ltd, MeTL is active in fuel importing, storage and distribution. It has modern fuel tanks and storage infrastructure near Dar es Salaam's port and sells petroleum products in Tanzania.
- Telecommunications and Electronics: MeTL previously held investments in mobile telephony and now markets electronics. For example, the “Me Electro” brand sells home appliances and power equipment in Tanzania. The group has also sold Bajaj brand motorcycles and three-wheelers under license.
- Real Estate and Infrastructure: MeTL holds real estate assets (offices, warehouses and farmland) and has developed social infrastructure (schools, clinics) through its corporate foundations.

Each business unit is run as a semi-autonomous division, but they all leverage MeTL's shared logistics and brand umbrella to create economies of scale. The group's in-house manufacturing allows it to substitute local production for imports: e.g. importing crude inputs and refining them locally (as with oil and sugar). As a result, MeTL often captures large local market share. Its Mo-brand consumer goods are especially ubiquitous.

== Structure ==
MeTL is privately held and led by the Dewji family. Mohammed “Mo” Dewji is the Group President and CEO, while his father (Gulamabbas) serves as chairman. Dewji is the principal shareholder (owning the majority stake) and other family members occupy senior management posts. The company has no outside equity investors or stock-market listing and is not publicly traded. Its headquarters is in the Golden Jubilee Towers in Dar es Salaam, with additional offices in regional cities and overseas.
