= Anas Sefrioui =

Moroccan real estate businessman (born 1957)

- Born: May 16, 1957 (age 69); Fez, Morocco
- Occupation: Businessman
- Known for: CEO of Addoha Group, CIMAT
- Children: 3

Anas Sefrioui (Arabic: أنس الصفريوي; born May 16, 1957) is a Moroccan real estate businessman, who is worth US$1.7 billion as of March 2025. He is the General President and 56.6% owner of the corporate enterprise known as Addoha Douja Promotion.

== Career ==
He dropped out of secondary school to work with his father Haj Abdeslam Sefrioui on a project to create a popular clay for washing a person's body and hair. Producing this substance would allow Sefrioui to accumulate the knowledge and basic business skills needed to run his own enterprises. Anas would gain the money needed to form a real estate development group in 1988. However, he would earn his first billions in 1995 where he was asked to build more than 2000 geared-to-income homes that received subsidization by the government of the late King Hassan II of Morocco.

In 2005, Sefroui earned an extra $1 billion to for a contract that was granted to build additional public housing units in Morocco. The affordable housing that Sefrioui has managed in the past in Morocco has become a guide to real estate development in the United Arab Emirates. Sefrioui launched two cement plants with capacity of 1.6 million tons in the Moroccan cities of Settat and Beni Mellal, creating Ciment de l'Atlas SA. He also launched 500 000 ton cement plants in Cameroon, Gabon, Ivory Coast and Guinea.

Sefrioui is also married and has three children. Sefrioui was acclaimed as one of the most powerful African business leaders of 2012.

On January 3, 2013, Sefrioui invited FC Barcelona forward Lionel Messi to attend an event promoting the polo club of Marrakesh. He would implement an idea to the media to build a cement packing factory in the Western African nation of Ivory Coast for €12,000,000 on April 11 of that year. Once opened, this plant will create 120 million bags of cement each year, with ten million bags specially earmarked for the domestic market.

== See also ==
- Economy of Morocco
