= Youssef Mansour =

Egyptian billionaire

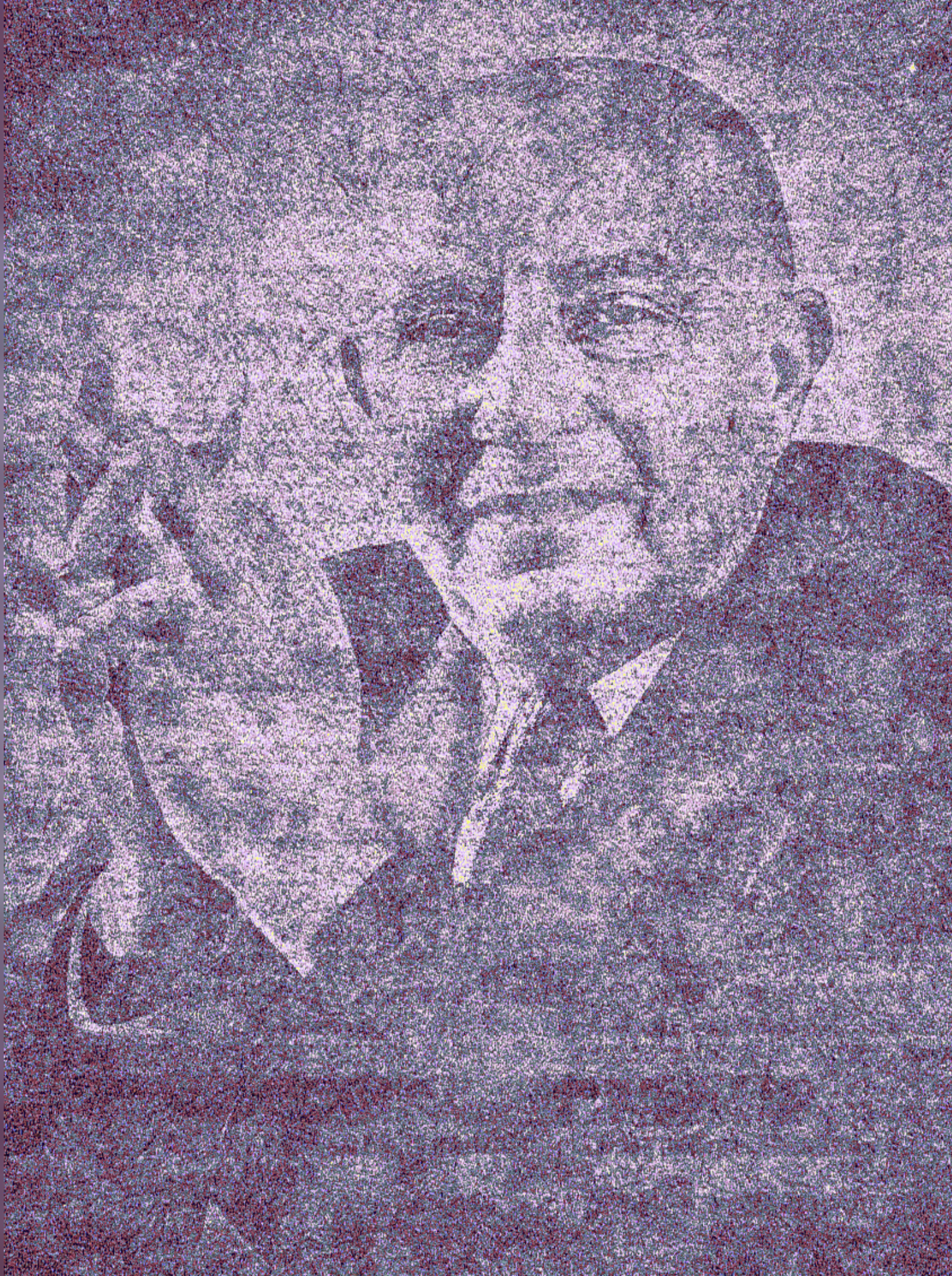
- An old photo of Youssef Mansour. Estimated 1990s.
- Born: Youssef L. Mansour; 21 May 1944 (age 82); Cairo or Alexandria, Kingdom of Egypt
- Education: North Carolina State University; Auburn University
- Occupations: Part owner, Mansour Group
- Known for: Relation to Sir Mohamed Mansour, Part owner, Mansour Group
- Spouse: married
- Children: 5
- Relatives: Sir Mohamed Mansour (brother); Yasseen Mansour (brother)
- Website: www.mansourgroup.com

Youssef Mansour (Arabic: يوسف منصور; born 21 May 1944) is an Egyptian billionaire businessman and part owner of the Mansour Group.

== Early life ==
He has two brothers who are also billionaires, Mohamed Mansour and Yasseen Mansour.

He has a Bachelor of Science in Engineering from North Carolina State University, and a Master of Business Administration from Auburn University.

== Career ==
In March 2020, Forbes estimated his net worth at US$1.9 billion.

== Personal life ==
He is married with five children, and lives in Cairo.
