= Mohamed Mansour (businessman) =

Egyptian businessman (born 1948)

Sir Mohamed Mansour
- محمد منصور
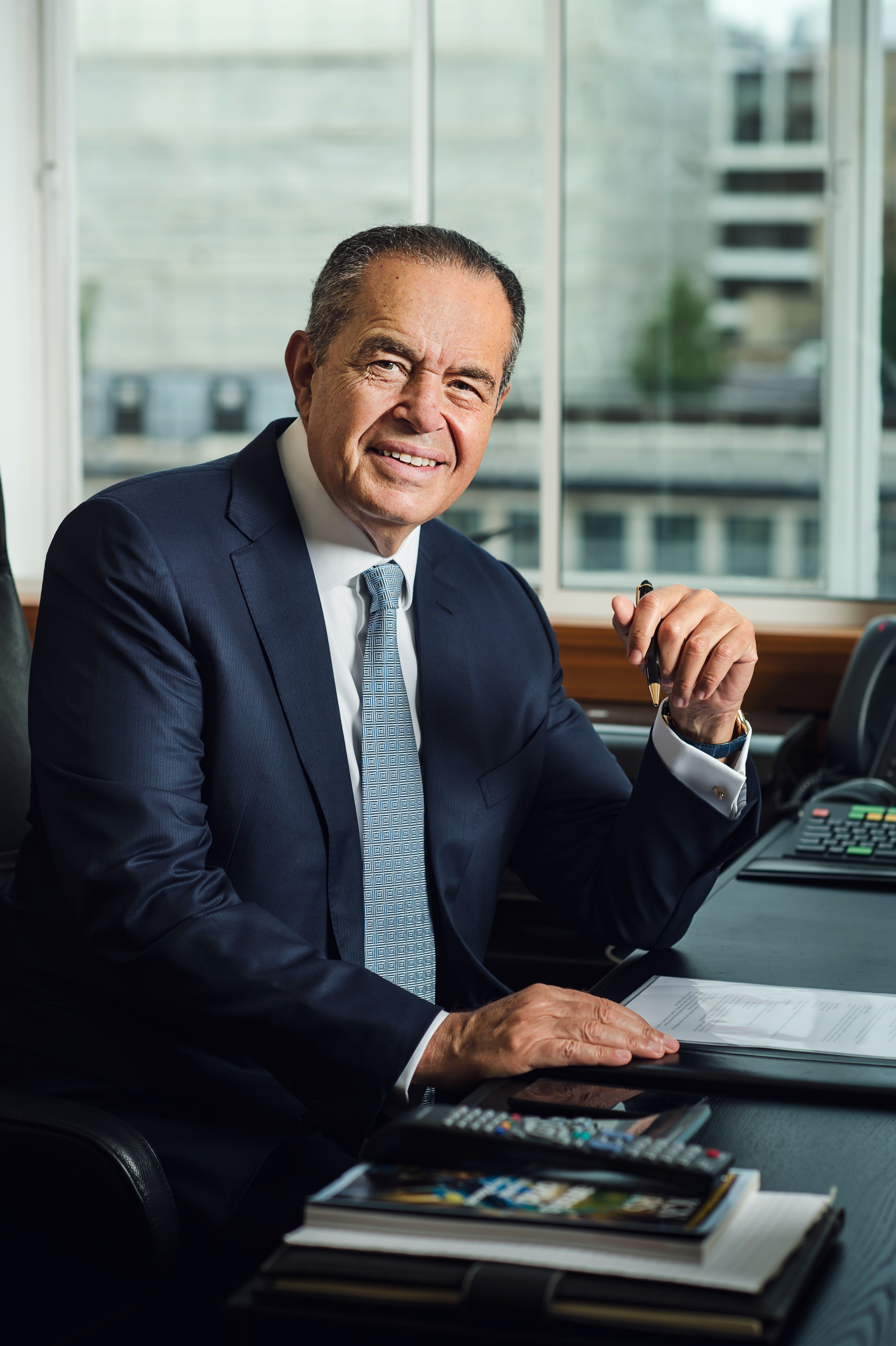
- Mansour in 2016

Minister of Transportation
- In office 29 January 2005 – 27 October 2009
- President: Hosni Mubarak
- Prime Minister: Ahmed Nazif
- Preceded by: Essam Sharaf
- Succeeded by: Alaa El Din Mohamed Fahmy

Personal details
- Born: January 1948 (age 78) Alexandria, Kingdom of Egypt
- Children: 2
- Relatives: Youssef Mansour (brother); Yasseen Mansour (brother)
- Education: North Carolina State University; Auburn University
- Occupation: Businessman, Chairman of Mansour Group

Sir Mohamed Mansour (Arabic: محمد منصور; born January 1948) is an Egyptian and British billionaire businessman and former politician. He is the chairman of the Mansour Group, a US$6 billion conglomerate. In October 2024, Forbes estimated his wealth at $3.3 billion. He served as the Minister of Transportation of Egypt between 2005 and 2009.

== Early life ==
Mansour was born into one of the most prominent business families in Alexandria. The family business, the Mansour Group, controls nine of Egypt's top Fortune 500 companies, though it needed to survive the nationalisation and confiscation of its assets in 1965.

Mansour received an engineering degree from North Carolina State University in 1968, and a master's in business administration from Auburn University in 1971, teaching there until 1973. In 2022, Mansour was awarded an honorary doctorate by North Carolina State University and made "Honorary Doctor of Humane Letters".

== Career ==
With his two brothers, Mansour maintained an active role in the Mansour Group, the family business, building close ties as distributors for US companies including Caterpillar, General Motors, and McDonald's. Mansour has led the group since his father died in 1976, overseeing all the major corporate developments, including setting up the company's private investment subsidiary Man Capital in London in 2010.

In December 2005, Mansour resigned from his business responsibilities to serve as Minister of Transportation. Mansour resigned in October 2009 after a deadly train crash.

In 2021, following a $120 million investment and operational takeover by the Mansour Group, Mansour was appointed Chairman of the Right to Dream Academy.

In December 2022, it was announced he would become senior treasurer for the UK Conservative Party.

In late 2022, Mansour was contacted by the Sycuan Band of the Kumeyaay Nation, who sought a financial partner to bid for a Major League Soccer expansion franchise in San Diego. In May 2023, Major League Soccer announced that the ownership group led by Mansour and the Sycuan Tribe had been awarded the new franchise, San Diego FC. The team's inaugural season began in 2025.

== Personal life ==
He is married with two sons, and lives in Mayfair, London.

As of February 2023, Mansour had donated £600,000 to the Conservative Party (UK). He made a donation of £5 million that May. The then-opposition Labour Party demanded Tory prime minister Rishi Sunak return Mansour's donation, after it emerged that one of Mansour's companies, Mantrac, was still operating in Russia after the invasion of Ukraine. In reply, Mantrac claimed it was winding down its business in Russia. In March 2024, Mansour received a knighthood from Sunak for his contributions to business, charity and political service. The honour was criticised by opposing political parties and media outlets.
