= Conoil =

Nigerian petroleum company

- Type: Public
- Traded as: NSE: CONOIL
- Industry: Petroleum marketing
- Founded: 1927
- Headquarters: Lagos, Nigeria
- Key people: Mike Adenuga
- Products: Petroleum, Quatro, Golden Super Motor Oil
- Net income: ₦4.9b

Conoil Plc is a Nigerian petroleum marketing company involved in the sale of regulated gasoline and kerosene, diesel, aviation fuel and low pour fuel. Other business activities of the firm include production and marketing of lubricants under the brand name Quatro. The company was previously known as National Oil and Chemical Marketing Plc until it was acquired by Conpetro in 2002.

In year 2016, the revenue of the company was 85 billion naira.

== History ==
Conoil is the first company to market petroleum products in bulk. The proliferation of cars in the 1920s led to the importation of gasoline in drums but in 1927, Shell built a bulk tank in Apapa and incorporated Oil Storage Company of Apapa in 1927. The company has gone through a few name transformations, it was known as Shell Company of Nigeria and then Shell Company of West Africa. In 1975, Nigerian government took a controlling 60% interest in the company and the name was changed to National Oil Company of Nigeria. The previous shell logo was changed and replaced with a new one showing an eagle. In 1989, 20% equity was sold to the public. By 1996, the company owned about 300 fuel stations, two major infrastructures in Apapa and Port-Harcourt and sold other petrochemical products such as aerosol, shelltox and Teepol. The total revenue for the year 1994 was 7.96 billion naira.

On 6 August 2018, the Nigerian Stock Exchange suspended the trading of Conoil shares as a result of the failure of the company to submit its audited financial results in due time. The exchange lifted the suspension on 8 August 2018 after the company released its Q1 2018 financial results.
