= Kabiru Rabiu =

Nigerian entrepreneur

Kabiru Rabiu (born 28 November 1980) is a Nigerian entrepreneur and currently serves as the group executive director of BUA Group. A conglomerate owned by his brother Abdulsamad Rabiu, in which enabled him to generate his wealth and achieve his status today In 2020, he was named the best African economic leader under the age of 40 in the 100 African Economic Leaders for Tomorrow awards by the French Institut Choiseu.

== Education and career ==
Rabiu received a bachelor's degree in management from Webster University, on and had his master's degree from the American Intercontinental University in London. Rabiu started his career with Universal Rice Mills and later joined the Nigeria Oil Mills Limited where he served as the assistant general manager and later became the general manager. In 2008, he became the executive director of the BUA Oil Mills Limited. In 2010, he became the executive director of BUA Group. Kabiru is the founder of Hollaport (a payment and messaging application).

Kabiru Rabiu is a Non-Executive Director at BUA Foods Plc, a Non-Executive Director at BUA Cement Plc, and the Group Executive Director at BUA Group. He has over 20 years’ experience spanning multiple sectors, including edible oils, cement, and infrastructure. Prior to his appointment, he held various management positions at Nigeria Oil Mills as General Manager, and later as Managing Director of BUA Oil Mills Limited where he successfully turned around the businesses. He was the pioneer Chairman of the Nigerian Sugar Institute, and he currently sits on the boards of several private and listed companies in Nigeria.

He holds a Bachelor’s degree in Management from Webster University, London, and an MBA in International Business from American Intercontinental University UK. Kabiru has won numerous awards and is a 2-time Laureate of the Institut Choiseul, France. He has also attended various courses in several business schools, including the London School of Economics and Political Science, Harvard Business School, Stanford University, and NYU amongst other institutions
