= Hariri =

Hariri (in Arabic حريري) is a surname and derivative of harir (in Arabic حرير meaning silk) which indicates a mercantile background at one point in that field.

== People ==
=== Historic ===
- Ali Hariri (1009–1079), Kurdish poet
- Al-Hariri of Basra (1054–1122), Arab poet, scholar of the Arabic language and a high government official of the Seljuk Empire

=== Surname ===
==== Family of Rafic Hariri ====
- Ayman Hariri (born 1978), Lebanese businessman, son of Rafic Hariri
- Bahia Hariri (born 1952), Lebanese politician, sister of Rafic Hariri
- Bahaa Hariri (born 1966), Lebanese business tycoon, son of Rafic Hariri
- Fahd Hariri (born 1980/1981), Lebanese businessman and property developer, the son of Rafic Hariri
- Hind Hariri (born 1984), daughter and youngest child of Rafic Hariri
- Nazik Hariri, widow of Rafic Hariri
- Rafic Hariri (1944–2005), business tycoon and Lebanese Prime Minister; assassinated
- Saad Hariri (born 1970), politician, business tycoon, Lebanese Prime Minister, and son of Rafic Hariri

==== Other people ====
- Abbas Hariri, Iranian wrestler
- Abu Al-Izz Al-Hariri (1946–2014), Egyptian politician and member of parliament
- Abdulhadi Al Hariri (born 1992), Syrian footballer
- Binyan al-Hariri, Syrian Army colonel
- Fawzi Hariri (born 1958), Iraqi Minister of Industry and Minerals (since 2006)
- Franso Hariri (1937–2001), Kurdish Iraqi politician
- Lamia Al Hariri, Syrian diplomat
- May Hariri (born 1972), Lebanese pop artist and actress
- Naser al-Hariri, Syrian politician
- Omar El-Hariri (c. 1944–2015), Libyan politician, minister, leading figure of the National Transitional Council of Libya
- Robert Hariri, MD, PhD, former CEO of Celgene Cellular Therapuetics, and co-founder of Human Longevity, Inc.
- Salman Al-Hariri (born 1988), Saudi footballer
- Siamak Hariri (born 1958), a Canadian architect
- Wahbi al-Hariri (1914–1994), Syrian-American architect, artist and author
- Ziad al-Hariri (born 1930), Syrian Army chief of staff
- Serena Hariri (born 2000), TSG Consumer Front Office Coordinator

=== Given name ===
- Hariri Safii (born 1989), Malaysian footballer

== Businesses ==
- Hariri & Hariri Architecture, New York, U.S.
- Hariri Pontarini Architects, Toronto, Canada

== Places ==
- Beirut–Rafic Hariri International Airport, Lebanon
- Nazik Al-Hariri Welfare Center for Special Education, Amman, Jordan
- Rafic El-Hariri Stadium, Beirut, Lebanon
- Rafik Hariri University Hospital, Beirut, Lebanon

== See also ==
- Harari (disambiguation)
