= Hariri family =

Prominent family from Lebanon, involved in politics and business

The Hariri family is a prominent family from Lebanon, involved in politics and business. They are Jordan's largest real estate property investors.

== Business ==
The family has investments in banking, including a significant stake in the Arab Bank, one of the largest banks in the Middle East. They have also been involved in various financial holdings through their family companies, such as GroupeMed, which has interests in banking and real estate.

Saad Hariri, before entering politics, served as the Chairman of Oger Telecom, which operates in several countries, including Turkey and Saudi Arabia. The company provides various telecommunications services and has been involved in significant investments in the sector. The Hariri family owns several media outlets, including Future TV and Al-Mustaqbal newspaper. They are also involved in other media ventures through intermediary companies, reflecting their influence in the media landscape of Lebanon. They are also involved in Annahar through Al Mal Investment Co. SAL, in Radio Orient through Wave Holding, and in The Daily Star through D.S. Holding and Millennium Development.

== The Hariri family connection with the Mikati Family ==
The Hariri family and the Mikati family have a long-standing relationship in Lebanese politics and business. Najib Mikati, a Lebanese businessman and politician, served as Prime Minister of Lebanon twice, first from 2005 to 2008 and then again in 2011. During his second term as prime minister, Mikati formed a government with the support of Hezbollah, a political and militant group in Lebanon that is backed by Iran. Lebanon was soon plunged into both political and economic crisis as the Syrian uprising against Assad devolved into a civil war. Because Lebanon was still intricately linked with Syria, the stakes were high for Lebanon's political actors. The economy, which had avoided much of the tumult of the 2008 financial crisis, was now strained by a devastated Syrian market and the massive influx of refugees into Lebanon. The polarized environment left Mikati unable to navigate the demands of those who supported Assad and those who wanted him out of power. Mikati resigned from the premiership in March 2013 but remained in a caretaker capacity until a replacement was found in February 2014.

Polarization ultimately brought him back to the premiership in 2021, however. Crises remained unresolved in the years that followed his stint as prime minister, and the government's ineptitude had eventually given way to neglect. When an abandoned store of ammonium nitrate in Beirut resulted in a deadly and destructive mushroom cloud explosion in August 2020, the government resigned. After nearly a year of failed attempts to form a new government, Mikati was appointed prime minister as a compromise candidate in July 2021, and his cabinet was approved by parliament in September.

Najib Mikati's political alliance with Hezbollah, which is opposed by the Hariri family, led to tensions between the two families. In 2013, Mikati resigned as prime minister amid political deadlock and growing security concerns in Lebanon. Despite their political differences, the Hariri and Mikati families have continued to maintain business ties and investments in Lebanon and abroad.

In particular, the Mikati family has significant investments in the telecommunications industry through their company M1 Group, which has partnerships with international telecom companies such as Zain and Turkcell. The Hariri family also has investments in the telecom sector, with their company Saudi Oger holding a stake in the Saudi Telecom Company. However, Saudi Oger has faced financial difficulties and is no longer operational, while M1 Group continues to be a major player in the telecom industry in Lebanon and the region.

== Controversies ==
=== Saudi Arabia conflict ===
Saad Hariri resigned as Lebanon's prime minister in November 2017, while he was on a visit to Saudi Arabia. The resignation was widely seen as forced by the Saudi government, which had been embroiled in a power struggle with Iran over regional influence. Hariri eventually returned to Lebanon and rescinded his resignation, but the incident highlighted the political instability and external pressures facing Lebanon.

=== Corruption and money laundering ===
The Hariri family is one of the wealthiest families in Lebanon and the Middle East, with a business empire that spans construction, real estate, finance, and media. The family's wealth and influence have often been criticized for perpetuating the country's economic inequality and political corruption. However, the family has also been praised for its philanthropic activities and support for education and healthcare in Lebanon.

The collapse of the Bank al-Madina, which was linked to Rafik Hariri, has been associated with broader allegations of financial corruption and money laundering in Lebanon. Missing funds from the bank were linked to the assassination of the Rafik Hariri in 2005.

== Hariri family ties to Saudi Arabia ==
The Hariri family has long had close ties to the Saudi royal family, which has provided political and financial support for their business and political activities. However, the family's ties to Saudi Arabia have also been criticized for their role in exacerbating sectarian tensions and political instability in Lebanon and the region. In particular, Saad Hariri's close relationship with Saudi Crown Prince Mohammed bin Salman had raised concerns about his independence and credibility as a political leader.

== Notable people ==
- Rafic Hariri (1944–2005), business tycoon and Lebanese Prime Minister; assassinated
- Bahia Hariri (born 1952), Lebanese politician, sister of Rafic Hariri
- Bahaa Hariri (born 1966), Lebanese business tycoon, son of Rafic Hariri
- Saad Hariri (born 1970), politician, business tycoon, Lebanese Prime Minister, and son of Rafic Hariri
- Ayman Hariri (born 1978), Lebanese businessman, son of Rafic Hariri
- Fahd Hariri (born 1980/1981), Lebanese businessman and property developer, the son of Rafic Hariri
- Hind Hariri (born 1984), daughter and youngest child of Rafic Hariri
- Nazik Hariri, widow of Rafic Hariri

== See also ==
- Hariri, for the name itself
