= List of Lebanese by net worth =

The following Forbes list of Lebanese billionaires is based on an annual assessment of wealth and assets compiled and published by Forbes magazine in 2026.

== 2026 Forbes Lebanese billionaires list ==
Global ranking	Name	Citizenship	Net worth (USD)	Sources of wealth
1137	Najib Mikati	Lebanon; Cyprus	3.8 billion	M1 Group, MTN Group
1137	Taha Mikati	Lebanon; Cyprus	3.8 billion	M1 Group, MTN Group
1834	Bahaa Hariri	Lebanon; France; Saudi Arabia; Iraq	2.3 billion	Horizon Group, Global Express Logistics
2600	Robert Mouawad	Lebanon	1.5 billion	Jewelry, Diamonds, Real estate
2712	Ayman Hariri	Lebanon; France; Saudi Arabia	1.4 billion	Saudi Oger, Türk Telekom, Arab Bank
3185	Fahd Hariri	Lebanon; France; Saudi Arabia	1.1 billion	Furniture, Real estate

== Billionaires of Lebanese descent ==
The following list is the ranking of all the identified billionaires of Lebanese descent outside their country as of February 2014.

#	Name	Net worth (USD)	Origin	Residence
1	Carlos Slim	$67.1 billion	Lebanon	Mexico
2	Joseph Safra	$22.8 billion	Syria	Brazil
3	Gilbert Chagoury	$7.4 billion	Lebanon	Nigeria
4	Nicolas Hayek and Family	$4.1 billion	Lebanon	Switzerland
5	Robert Naify	$4.0 billion	Lebanon	United States
6	David Nahmad	$4 billion	Syria	Monaco
7	Ezra Nahmad	$3.5 billion	Syria	Monaco
8	Tom Gores	$3.3 billion	Lebanon	United States
9	Tony Fadell	$3.2 billion	Lebanon	United States
10	Richard Rainwater	$2.8 billion	Lebanon	United States
11	Moise Safra	$2.4 billion	Syria	Brazil
12	Alvaro Saieh	$2.4 billion	Lebanon	Chile
13	Alec Gores	$2.1 billion	Lebanon	United States
14	Manuel Moroun	$2 billion	Lebanon	United States
15	Joe Jamail	$1.7 billion	Lebanon	United States
16	Alfredo Harp Helu	$1.5 billion	Lebanon	Mexico
18	Robert Mouawad	$1.5 billion	Lebanon	Switzerland
19	Maloof family	$1.3 billion	Lebanon	United States
20	Jacques Saadé	$1.2 billion	SyriaLebanon	France
21	Said Khoury	$1.2 billion	Lebanon	Greece
22	Philippe Jabre	$1.15 billion	Lebanon	Switzerland
23	Thomas J. Barrack	$1.1 billion	Lebanon	United States
24	Fred Mouawad	$1.1 billion	Lebanon	France
25	Paul Orfalea	$1 billion	Lebanon	United States
26	Ray R. Irani	$1 billion	Lebanon	United States

== See also ==
- List of Lebanese people
- List of political families in Lebanon
- List of billionaires
