= List of Arabs by net worth =

This is a list of wealthy Arabs ranked by net worth. It is based on an annual assessment of wealth and assets by Forbes Middle East.

== Top 22 richest Arabs ==
According to Forbes Middle East, as of April 2023, the 22 wealthiest Arabs are as follows:

Rank	Global rank	Name	Net worth in billion US$	Sector	Citizenship	Age
1	305	Nassif Sawiras	▼7.4	Construction, investments	Egypt	62
2	591	Issad Rebrab	▼4.6	Food and beverage	Algeria	79
3	611	Hussain Sajwani	▲4.5	Real estate	United Arab Emirates	70
4	787	Mohamed Mansour	▲3.6	Diversified	Egypt	75
5	878	Naguib Sawiris	▼3.3	Telecommunications	Egypt	69
6	982	Abdulla Al Ghurair	▲3	Diversified	United Arab Emirates	93
7	1067	Najib Mikati	▼2.8	Telecommunications	Lebanon	67
8	1067	Taha Mikati	▲2.4	Telecommunications	Lebanon	79
9	1104	Suhail Bahwan	▲2.7	Diversified	Oman	85
10	1272	Abdulla Al Futtaim	▼2.4	Auto dealers, investments	United Arab Emirates	83
11	1434	Bahaa Hariri	2.1	Real estate, investments	Lebanon; Saudi Arabia; France	57
12	1516	Mohamed Al Fayed	▼2	Real estate	Egypt	94
13	1647	Faisal Bin Qassim Al Thani	▼1.8	Diversified	Qatar	75
14	1721	Mohammed Alsaloussi	▼1.6	Fintech	Egypt	41
15	1905	Youssef Mansour	1.5	Diversified	Egypt	79
16	1905	Aziz Akhannouch	▼1.5	Diversified	Morocco	61
17	1905	Robert Mouawad	1.5	Fine jewelry	Lebanon	78
18	2020	Ayman Hariri	1.4	Construction, investments	Lebanon; Saudi Arabia; France	45
19	2133	Yasseen Mansour	▲1.3	Diversified	Egypt	62
20	2133	Othman Benjelloun	1.3	Finance, investments	Morocco	92
21	2259	Hamad bin Jassim bin Jaber Al Thani	1.2	Finance, investments	Qatar	64
22	2259	Fahd Hariri	1.2	Construction, investments	Lebanon; Saudi Arabia; France	42

== See also ==
- List of wealthiest families
