= Vero (app) =

Mobile app

- Type: Private
- Industry: Social media
- Founder: Ayman Hariri
- Parent: Vero Labs, Inc
- Website: vero.co

Vero
Stable release
- iOS: 2.4.3 / December 16, 2025; 11 months ago
- Android: 2.4.2 / November 23, 2025; 11 months ago
- Desktop (beta): 0.19.2339-beta / November 27, 2025; 11 months ago
- Operating system: iOS, Android, Windows, MacOS
- Website: vero.co

Vero (stylized as VERO) is a social media platform and mobile app company. Vero markets itself as a social network free from advertisements, data mining and algorithms.

== History ==
The app was founded by French-Lebanese billionaire Ayman Hariri who is the son of former Lebanese prime minister Rafic Hariri. The name is taken from the Italian word for "true". The app launched officially in 2015 as an alternative to Facebook and their popular photo-blogging app Instagram. Within weeks of its release the app surged in popularity although users expressed mixed reports with some feeling confused about how the app worked.

Cosplayers were early to adopt the app as their photo-sharing platform of choice, favouring the app's pinch and zoom magnification feature over Instagram's zoom feature. Other creative communities soon followed, and the app became popular with niche groups of makeup artists, tattoo artists, and skateboarders.

In March 2018, Vero's popularity surged, partly helped by an exodus from Facebook and Instagram following the Cambridge Analytica data scandal. In the wake of the scandal, Vero devised an advertising campaign aimed at defected Facebook and Instagram users, hoping the app's policies and privacy settings would assuage concerns over sharing personal information on the internet. Within the space of one week, the app went from being a small service, akin to Ello or Peach, to being the most downloaded app in eighteen countries.

In December 2020, Vero released its most significant update to date, Vero 2.0, which introduced new features including voice and video calls, game and app posts and bookmarks, and refinements to the UI.

In October 2021, Vero introduced their Desktop app (beta) with multiple post options and a re-sizable multi-column feed.

== Concept and funding ==
Vero's content feed resembles Instagram's although users can share a wider variety of content and the app has a chronological content feed whereas Facebook and Instagram's feeds are algorithm based. Vero's business plan is also distinct from similar social media apps. Whereas its competitors such as Facebook or Instagram make money from in-app advertising revenue and the sale of user data, Vero's business plan was to invite the first one million users to use the app for free then charge any subsequent users a subscription fee.

The app was entirely funded by its founder and generated additional revenues by charging affiliate fees when someone buys a product they find on Vero.

== Awards ==
Vero was recognized at the 2021 Webbys, being named as an Honoree in the Best Visual Design - Aesthetic Category.

== Controversies ==
=== Privacy ===
Vero has faced some criticism over the wording of their manifesto, in particular, the statement "Vero only collects the data we believe is necessary to provide users with a great experience and to ensure the security of their accounts." Because this policy does not explicitly state that the app will not sell data on to third parties some users fear that the need to monetise the app through data might prove too tempting.

Users have also complained about not being able to delete their accounts. While this was never the case, the option was hidden deep in the app's settings.

=== Russian involvement ===
Although Vero remains transparent about the app's Russian development team, they have been caught up in concerns about Russian interference on social media platforms. The app's founder Ayman Hariri was quick to dismiss the remarks as xenophobic and defend the nationality of his employees, stating in an interview with Time Magazine; "At the end of the day, where people are from is really not how anybody should judge anyone".

=== Criticism of the app's founder ===
Until 2013, Vero's founder Ayman Hariri was deputy CEO and chairman of Saudi Oger, the Saudi Arabian construction company which collapsed in 2017, mired by controversies over the welfare and treatment of their employees. However, Hariri is quick to point out that he divested from the firm in 2014 and the worker's rights violations occurred after he had left the company.
