= Nazik Al-Hariri Welfare Center for Special Education =

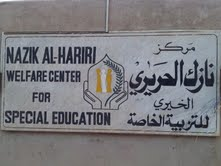

Location
- Qusoor Malakeah Road; Dabouq; Amman; Jordan

Information
- School type: Special education
- Established: 1985
- Founder: Nazik Hariri
- Staff: 60
- Enrollment: 170
- Campus size: 13 000 m^{2}

Nazik Al-Hariri Welfare Center for Special Education was founded by Nazik Hariri in 1985 in Amman, Jordan. It provides students with special needs with social care, education, rehabilitation and recreational care by helping them acquire daily life skills in addition to academic and vocational skills.

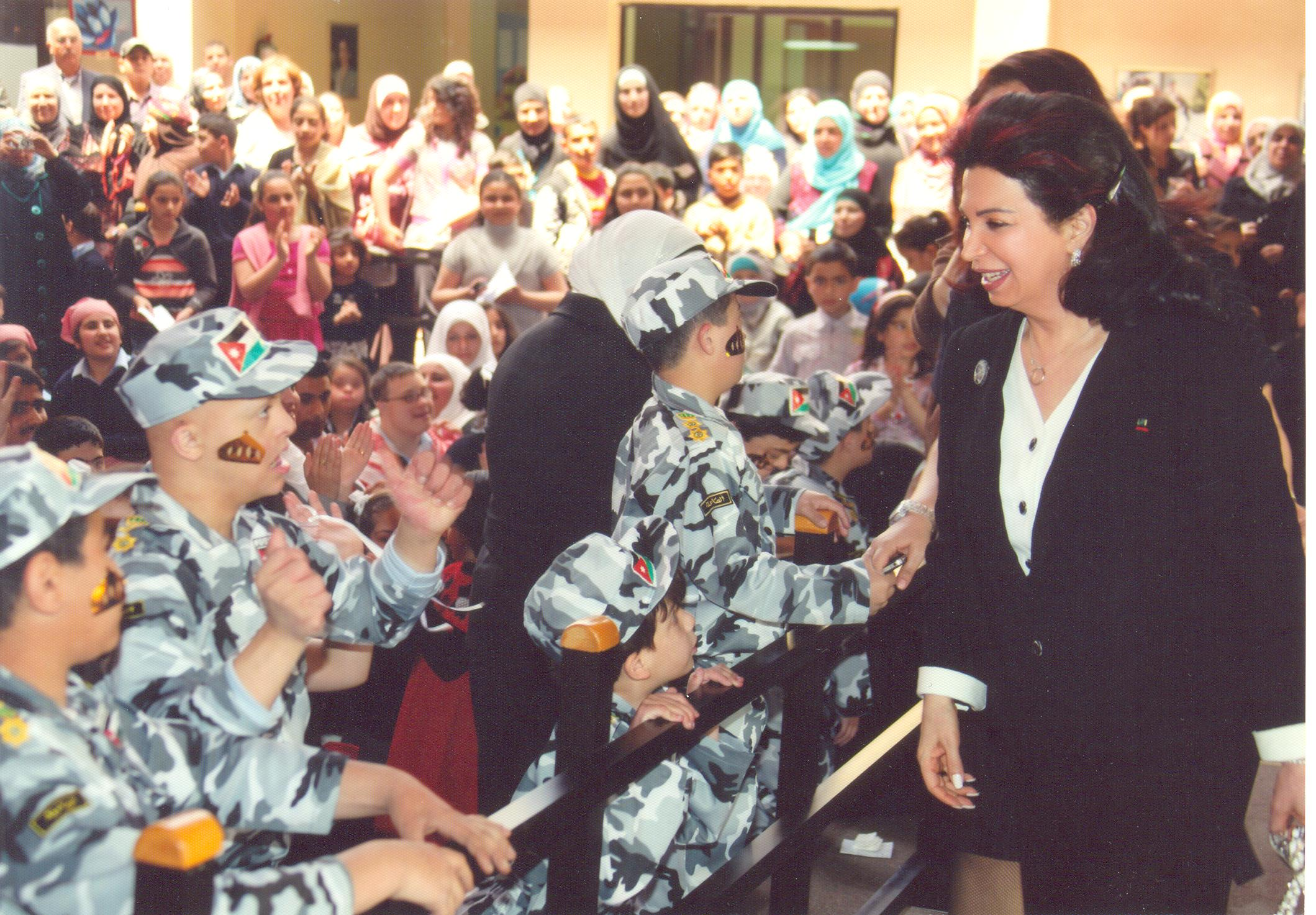
Nazik Hariri

The Center provides technical consultations for institutions inside and outside Jordan.

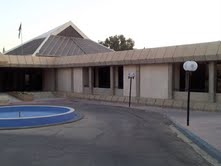
