= The Daily Star (Lebanon) =

English language newspaper in Beirut, Lebanon

- Front page of The Daily Star newspaper (13 August 2014)
- Type: Daily newspaper
- Format: Berliner
- Publisher: Salma El Bissar
- Editor-in-chief: Nadim Ladki
- Associate editor: Hanna Anbar
- Founded: 1952
- Ceased publication: February 2020 (print); October 2021 (online)
- Political alignment: Future Movement through Hariri family ownership
- Language: English
- Headquarters: Beirut, Lebanon
- Circulation: Print (Ceased) and Digital
- ISSN: 1027-3883
- Website: Official website

The Daily Star was an English-language newspaper in Lebanon which was distributed across the Middle East. It was founded by Kamel Mrowa in 1952, ceased its print format in February 2020, and completely closed on 31 October 2021.

== History ==
The paper was founded in 1952 by Kamel Mrowa, the publisher of the Arabic daily Al-Hayat, to serve the growing number of expatriates brought by the oil industry. The Daily Star was established as an English supplement of Al-Hayat. First circulating in Lebanon and then expanding throughout the region, The Daily Star not only relayed news about foreign workers' home countries, but also served to keep them informed about the region. By the 1960s, it was the leading English language newspaper in the Middle East.

Upon the death of Mrowa in 1966, his widow Salma El Bissar took over the paper, running it until the outbreak of the Lebanese Civil War forced the suspension of publication. With peace hopes running high in the beginning of 1983, the paper restarted publication under the guidance of Mrowa's sons, but the intensification of the war again put the paper under pressure. The flight of the intelligentsia from the country depleted the paper's staff and its readership. Still, it continued as a daily until mid 1985 and then as a weekly for another year, before ceasing publication once again. One of daily's early editors was Jihad Khazen.

With the arrival of peace in 1991, and the development of a rebuilding program three years later, the paper again looked to publish. With Kamel's first son Jamil Mroue as leader, printing was recommenced in 1996 with modern presses, experienced foreign journalists, and Lebanese staff.

In 2004, The Daily Star merged its Lebanon and regional editions choosing to focus on Lebanese expatriates in the Persian Gulf region. The unified edition appeared in most countries except for Kuwait which had its own local edition published in partnership with Al-Watan, a Kuwaiti Arabic language daily.

For two weeks (14 January to 31 January 2009), the printing of the paper was suspended by a Lebanese court order after financial difficulties. The website was not being updated either. The newspaper resumed publishing the second week of February 2009 with certain agreements with creditors about payment of accumulating debt.

On 4 February 2020, the newspaper announced a temporary suspension of its print publication owing to financial difficulties.

On 13 October 2021, the newspaper said its online news coverage had been temporarily suspended due to "circumstances beyond our control." Several weeks later, on 31 October 2021, its editor-in-chief Nadim Ladki told employees that the newspaper was officially shutting down.

== Ownership ==
According to the Media Ownership Monitor, an initiative by Reporters Without Borders and the Samir Kassir Foundation, The Daily Star was owned by the political Hariri family through D.S. Holding and Millennium Development.

== Distribution and circulation ==
The Daily Star signed an exclusive marketing representation, printing and distribution agreement with the International Herald Tribune in 2000. Under the terms of the agreement, The Daily Star represented the IHT in the GCC, Lebanon, Syria, Jordan, Egypt, Yemen and Iraq. The Daily Star also produced a local edition in Kuwait.

Under this agreement, The Daily Star was published and distributed alongside the International Herald Tribune's Middle-East edition. The Daily Star management however decided to break the agreement over a dispute regarding the newspaper's length, which the IHT management wanted to see reduced.

The paper reduced considerably in size after temporarily closing in January 2009. It was no longer distributed with the IHT.

== Downfall ==
In light of changes in consumer behavior having adverse reactions towards politically owned and affiliated media outlets following the October 17 Revolution, The Daily Star began losing revenue and readership. In February 2020, The Daily Star ceased its print editions, citing its inability to secure advertising. The company was also unable to pay their staff, with many reporting working for at least 6 months with no pay - a similar story to that of other Hariri-owned outlets like Future TV. As of December 2020, it no longer held the leading position for Lebanese news in English - losing its decades-long position to The961.

== Controversies ==
The Daily Star was one of the Lebanese newspapers which were close to SAVAK, Iranian intelligence agency, during the ownership of Kamel Mrowa who was an anti-Nasserist. However, the relations with Iran ended when the newspaper's office was attacked due to its extensive publications against Gamal Nasser, President of Egypt, and Iran recognized Israel.

The Daily Star, along with other Hariri-owned outlets like Future TV, had not been paying their staff salaries. They let go of employees who organized a strike at the company due to nonpayment of salaries, many of whom went on to join L'Orient Today, L'Orient le Jour's English section.

== Articles by Jamal Khashoggi ==
Jamal Khashoggi was a contributor as a Saudi political analyst and deputy editor of Saudi Arabia’s English-language Arab News and published several commentaries for The Daily Star. His opinions since 2002 included endorsing moderation and combating extremism in Western nations, referring to bin Laden as a moderate who was a victim converted to "extreme jihad," applying Geneva Convention articles in Gaza and the West Bank, and expressing skepticism of US-Israeli-Saudi relations, especially after the 1991 Gulf War honeymoon period, in view of demolition of Palestinian homes supported by Colin Powell and the Israeli government, and the lucrative target for potential seizure presented by Saudi Arabia's one-fourth of world's proven oil reserves.

One of the four 9/11 widows - known as the "Jersey Girls" - mentions the unusual timing of the disappearance of Khashoggi with respect to the release of documents by the Department of Justice, supporting the 9/11 Families' Litigation, that may implicate the Saudi government in the 9/11 attacks.
