= Okab Sakr =

Lebanese journalist and politician

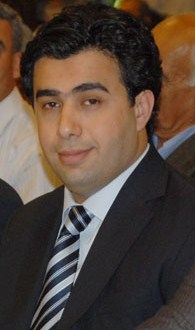
- Born: 2 October 1975 (age 50); Chyah, Lebanon
- Occupations: Journalist and Politician
- Political party: 14 March movement

Okab Sakr or Oakab Saker (Arabic: عقاب صقر; born 4 March 1975) is a Lebanese journalist and politician who lost his father before he was born during the beginning of the Lebanese civil war. Sakr won a seat in the Lebanese parliament on 7 June 2009, and one of few Shiite politicians that support, the mainly Sunni Muslim and Christian, 14 March movement.

== Early life and education ==
Okab was born in Chyah, Beirut on 2 October 1975. He was raised by his mother under difficult economic conditions. His family is from Zahle, Bekaa Valley and they are Lebanese Shiite Muslims. From The DEA Beirut Okab received a bachelor's degree in philosophy, then received a master's degree in social psychology and a higher education degree also from (DEA) in political sociology.

== Career ==
Sakr worked as a teacher for two years at USJ's Islamic and Christian Studies Institute, contributed to the establishment and management of the Permanent Dialogue Center. He also worked as assistant managing editor for Al Balad newspaper. He is manager of the New Opinion Center, and a member of the Arab Working Group on Muslim-Christian Dialogue. He is also general coordinator of the Arab Forum for Dialogue and Citizenship.

== Political affiliation ==
Sakr joined the "Lebanon First" parliamentary bloc.

=== Controversy ===
Sakr was allegedly involved in arming the insurgent in the Syrian civil war. At first he denied his involvement, but admitted it when Al Akhbar and OTV published audio tapes of him making arms deals with Syrian insurgents. Sakr later claimed the tapes were edited, and that he only provided Syrians with milk and blankets. On 12 December 2012, Syria issued an arrest warrant for Saad Hariri, Sakr and Media Coordinator for Free Syrian Army Louay Almokdad due to their alleged activities of arming and providing financial assistance to the Syrian opposition.

In December 2012, Sakr claimed that Jamil Al Sayyed had been allegedly in the car with Michel Samaha along with a third person while transferring explosives from Syria to Lebanon to carry out terrorist attacks.

== Personal life ==
Sakr is married to Nadine Falah.
