= Saad Hariri =

Lebanese politician (born 1970)

- سعد الحريري
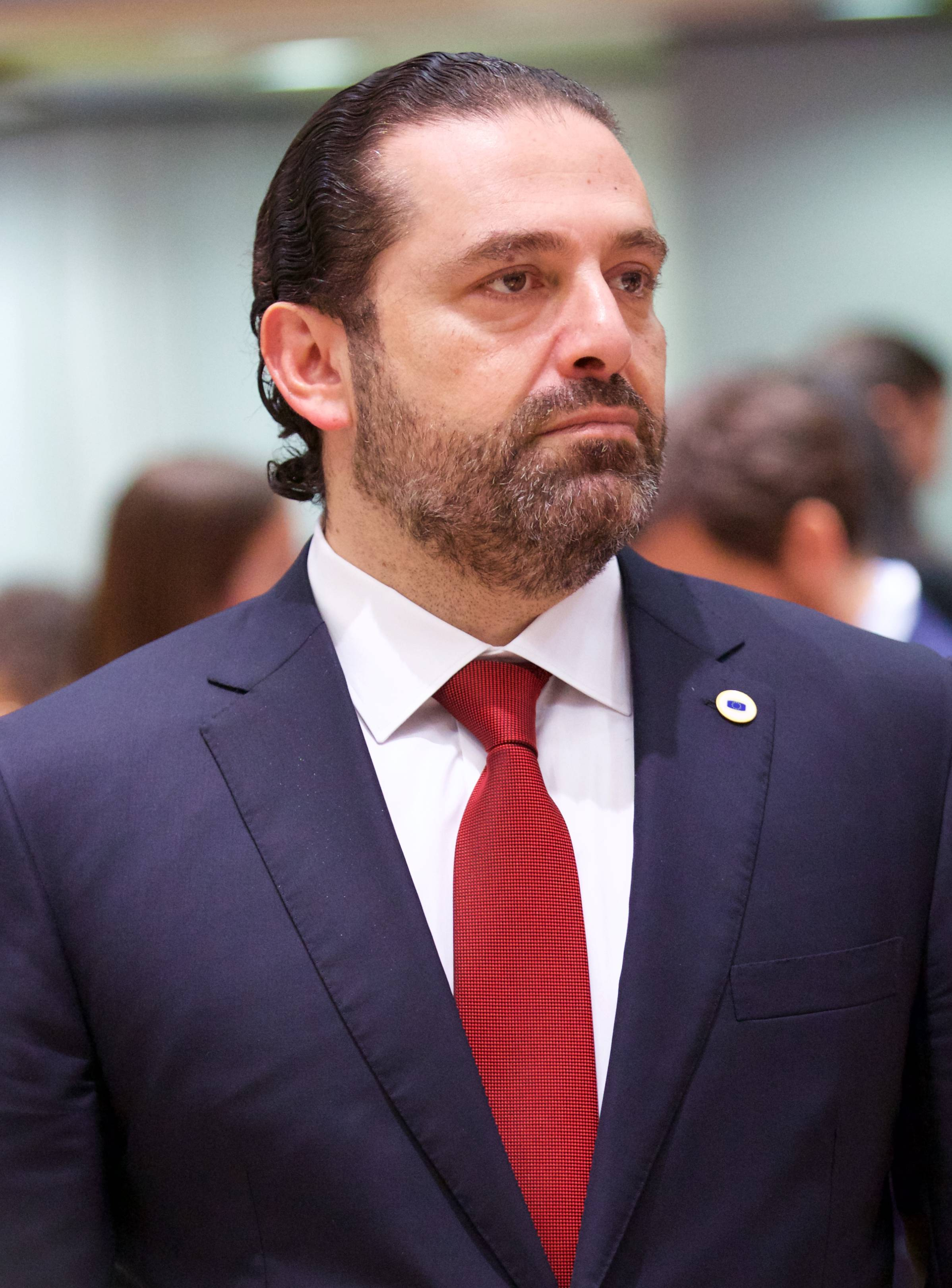
- Hariri in 2018

47th and 50th Prime Minister of Lebanon
- In office 18 December 2016 – 21 January 2020 (Note: During the 2017 Lebanon–Saudi Arabia dispute, Hariri announced his intentions to resign on 4 November 2017. He suspended his resignation on 21 November 2017 and officially revoked it on 5 December 2017, resuming all duties.)
- President: Michel Aoun
- Preceded by: Tammam Salam
- Succeeded by: Hassan Diab
- In office 9 November 2009 – 13 June 2011
- President: Michel Suleiman
- Preceded by: Fouad Siniora
- Succeeded by: Najib Mikati

Member of the Parliament of Lebanon
- In office 28 June 2005 – 21 May 2022
- Preceded by: Rafic Hariri
- Constituency: Beirut

Leader of the Future Movement
- Incumbent
- Assumed office 20 April 2005
- Preceded by: Rafic Hariri

Personal details
- Born: Saad El-Din Rafik Al-Hariri; 18 April 1970 (age 56) Riyadh, Saudi Arabia
- Citizenship: Lebanese; Saudi; French
- Party: Future Movement
- Other political affiliations: March 14 Alliance
- Spouse: Lara Al Azem (m. 1998)
- Children: 3
- Parents: Rafic Hariri (father); Nidal Bustani (mother)
- Relatives: Hariri family
- Education: Georgetown University
- Religion: Sunni Islam
- Website: Official website

Saad El-Din Rafik Al-Hariri (Arabic: سعد الدين رفيق الحريري, romanized: Saʿd ad-Dīn Rafīq al-Ḥarīrī; born 18 April 1970) is a Lebanese businessman and politician who served as the prime minister of Lebanon from 2009 to 2011 and 2016 to 2020. The son of Rafic Hariri, he founded and has been leading the Future Movement party since 2007. He is seen as "the strongest figurehead" of the March 14 Alliance.

Hariri served as Prime Minister of Lebanon from 9 November 2009 to 13 June 2011. After three years living overseas, he returned to Lebanon on 8 August 2014 and served a second term as prime minister from 18 December 2016 to 21 January 2020. Hariri's surprise announcement of an intent to resign, broadcast on 4 November 2017 on Saudi state TV, has widely been seen as part of the Iran–Saudi Arabia proxy conflict in Lebanon, and triggered a dispute between Lebanon and Saudi Arabia. The resignation was later suspended, following President Michel Aoun's request to "put it on hold ahead of further consultations". On 29 October 2019, amid the 2019–20 Lebanese protests, he announced his resignation, and that of his cabinet. He was designated as prime minister on 22 October 2020, but failed to form a government and resigned on 15 July 2021.

On 24 January 2022 he announced that he was retiring from politics and did not run in the parliamentary elections on 15 May 2022.

On February 14, 2025, Saad Hariri announced the return of his political party, the Future Movement, during a speech at Martyr's Square. He pledged that the party would actively participate in upcoming elections and continue to represent Lebanese voices. Hariri also addressed Lebanon's challenges, including the aftermath of the 2024 Israel-Hezbollah war, and called for rebuilding the nation while maintaining justice and sovereignty.

== Biography ==
Saad Hariri was born in Riyadh, Saudi Arabia on 18 April 1970, and is the son of Rafic Hariri and his first wife Nidal Bustani, an Iraqi woman originally from the city of Baghdad. His parents met while studying. In addition to his native Arabic, Hariri speaks English, French and Italian. He graduated in 1992 from the McDonough School of Business at Georgetown University with a degree in business administration.

== Business ==
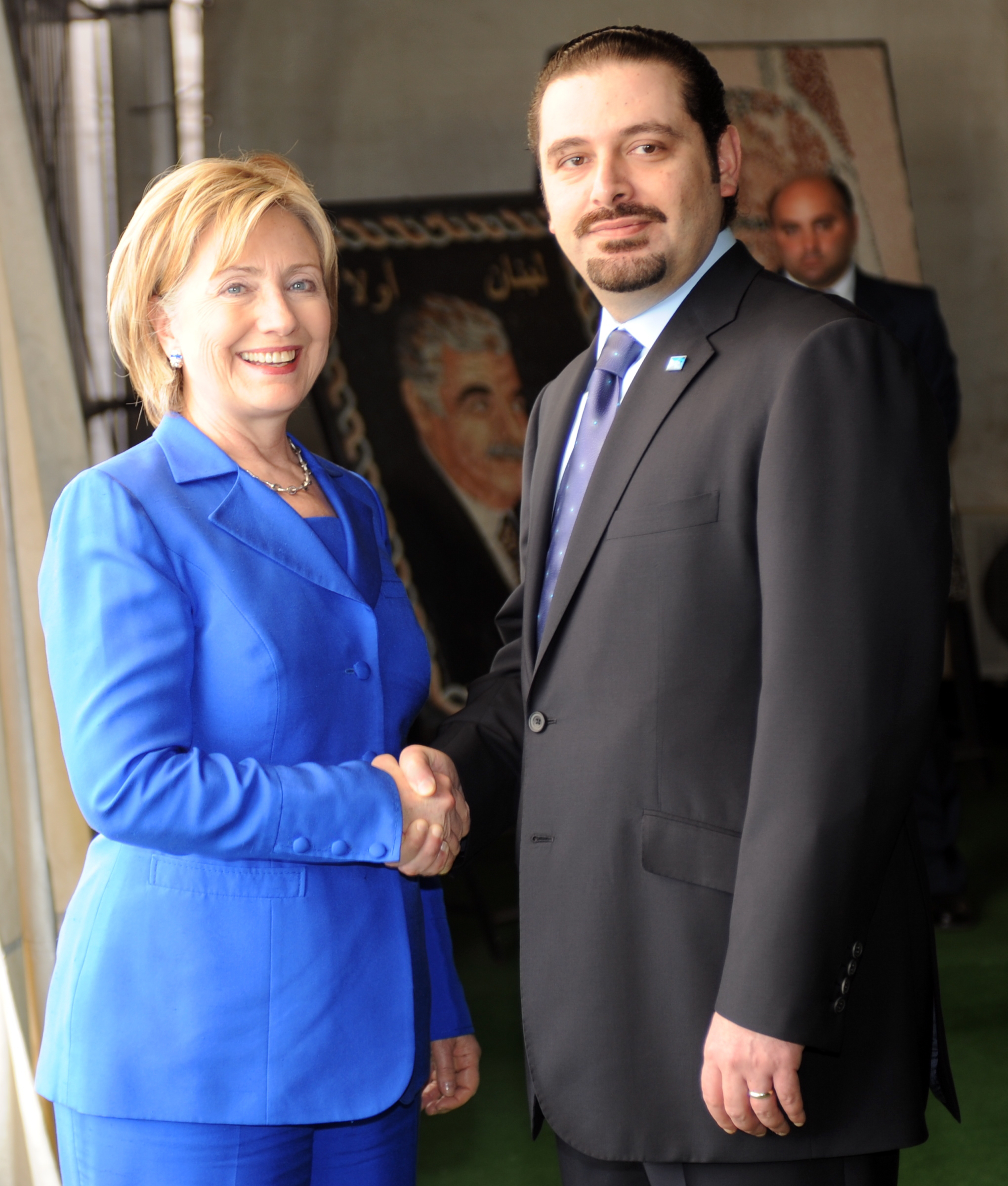
Hariri with Hillary Clinton in 2009

Prior to entering politics, Hariri was the chairman of the executive committee of Oger Telecom, which pursued telecommunication interests in the Middle East and Africa, from 1994 to 2005. In addition, Hariri was the chairman of Omnia Holdings and a board member of Oger International Entreprise de Travaux Internationaux, Saudi Oger, Saudi Investment Bank, Saudi Research and Marketing Group and Lebanese television channel Future TV.

== Political career ==
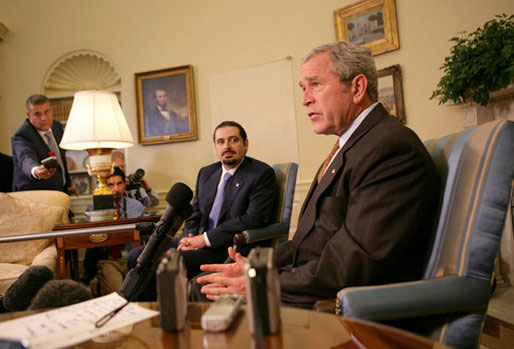
Bush meets with Saad Hariri in 2007

On 20 April 2005, the Hariri family announced that Saad Hariri would lead the Future Movement, an essentially Sunni movement that was created and led by his father. He was the leader of the March 14 Alliance, a coalition of political groups born out of the Cedar Revolution which, through mass popular demonstrations and Western support, led to the withdrawal of Syrian troops from Lebanon in 2005 after a 29-year presence.

According to WikiLeaks documents, Hariri met with Ambassador Jeffrey D. Feltman on 20 August during the 2006 Lebanon War, during which he criticized Army Commander Michel Suleiman for his subservient behavior towards Hezbollah following a statement he issued in support of them, and called Parliament Speaker Nabih Berri asking him to transfer the Shiite officers from the shipping station at Beirut International Airport, claiming that the United Nations wanted this, and also informed Berri, that he was ready to “strike and overthrow Hezbollah” if he gets the opportunity.

=== First tenure and collapse ===
Hariri was first elected prime minister from 9 November 2009 until 13 June 2011.

On 12 January 2011, minutes after Hariri posed for pictures with President Barack Obama in the Oval Office, the opposition parties resigned from his unity government cabinet, causing its collapse. The withdrawal of Hezbollah and its allies was due to political tensions arising from investigations into the assassination of Rafic Hariri. Hezbollah operatives of Unit 121 had been accused of assassinating Rafic Hariri. The resignations stemmed from PM Hariri's refusal to call an emergency cabinet session over discussion for withdrawing cooperation with the Special Tribunal for Lebanon, which was expected to indict Hezbollah members in the assassination of former Prime Minister Rafic Hariri. Following the fall of the government reports of an "imminent release" of the indictments circulated, though constitutionally there would be no government to receive the indictment as this was first time in Lebanese history a government had fallen after the resignations of a third of the government. Preliminary indictments were issued 17 January as expected,) though they were pending STL approval. The government lasted barely 14-months and was considered by the opposition as dysfunctional; its collapse precipitated a climate of political deadlock and tension similar to that which existed between 2006 and 2008.

Hariri continued on for four months as caretaker prime minister. He vowed to find a way out of the crisis saying his allies and he would take part in "consultations" to a name a new leader. Nabih Berri, the Lebanese parliamentary speaker and a member of the March 8 alliance, said Suleiman would formally launch talks to create a new government on 16 January. However, March 8 said it would no longer be involved in an Hariri government. Mohammad Raad, an Hezbollah MP, said his party would nominate a candidate for prime minister who has "a history of resistance." Though, March 14 said it would not accept anyone other than Hariri. One of his bloc's MP's, Boutros Harb, said "I do not see a government in the country without Saad Hariri."

The new Lebanese government was formed on 13 June 2011 and headed by Najib Mikati. Mikati created an 8 March-led government coalition.

=== Syrian arrest warrant ===
On 12 December 2012, Syria issued a warrant for the arrest of Hariri, Future bloc deputy Okab Sakr, and Free Syrian Army official Louay Almokdad on charges of arming and providing financial support for Syrian opposition groups. Hariri released a statement in response, describing Bashar al-Assad as a "monster".

=== Second tenure ===
Following more than two years of deadlock in electing a president, Michel Aoun was elected. Shortly after, Aoun signed a decree appointing Hariri as prime minister for the second time and he took office on 18 December 2016.

==== Dispute with Saudi Arabia ====
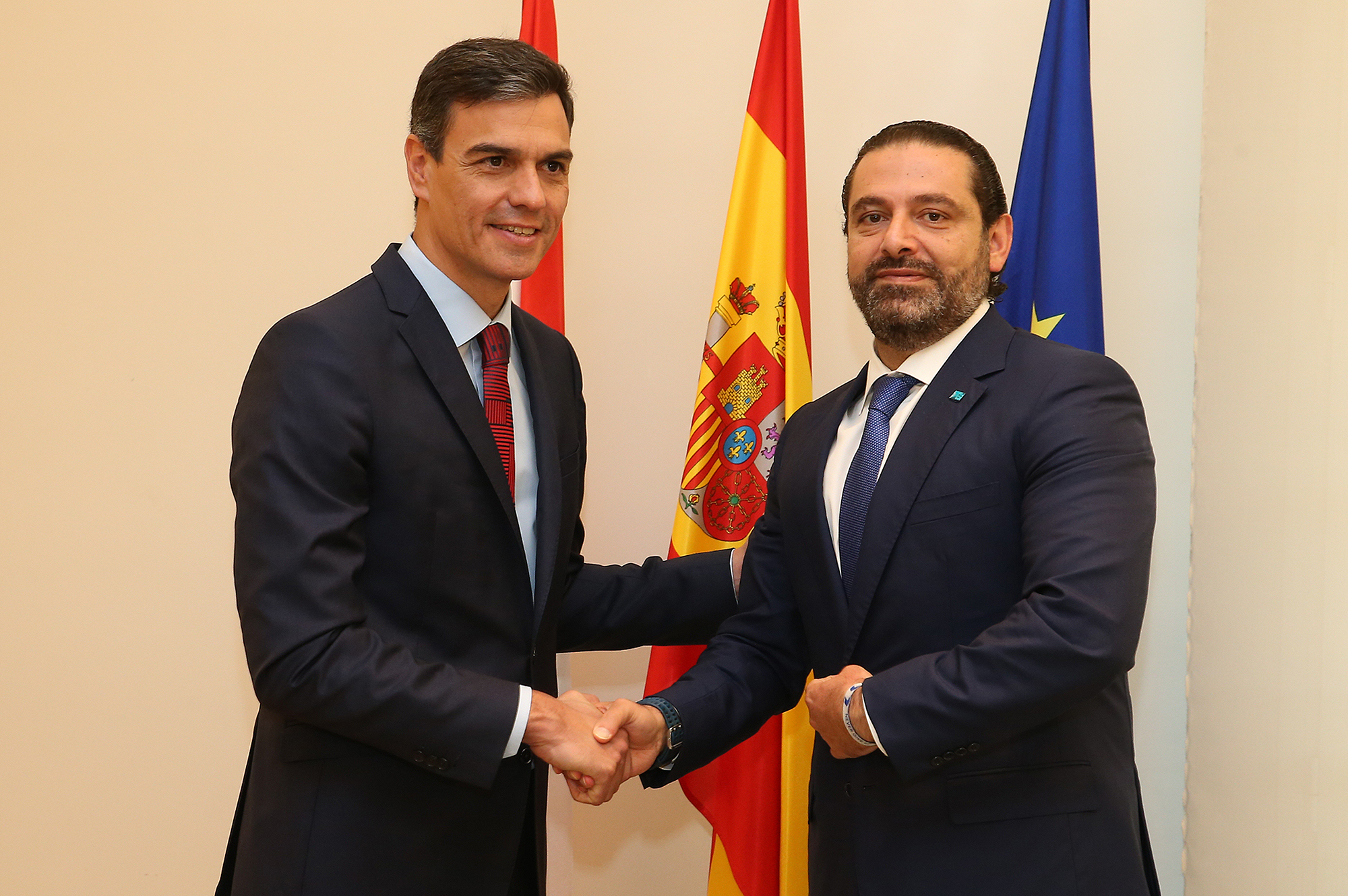
Hariri with Spanish Prime Minister Pedro Sánchez in Madrid, on 20 July 2018

On 4 November 2017, in a televised statement from Saudi Arabia, Hariri tendered his resignation from office, citing Iran's and Hezbollah's political over-extension in the Middle East region and fears of assassination. Iran vehemently rejected Saad Hariri's remarks and called his resignation part of a plot by the United States, Israel, and Saudi Arabia to heighten Middle Eastern tensions. The Lebanese Army responded with a statement that intelligence in its possession in addition to ongoing arrests and investigations had not revealed "the presence of any plan for assassinations in the country."

Most Iran-leaning or Shia-aligned Lebanese groups, including Hezbollah, were among the first to accuse Saudi Arabia of holding Hariri hostage. Hariri's associates and Saudi officials subsequently denied this. Several Lebanese commentators poked fun at the released pictures of Hariri in Saudi Arabia for their apparent similarity to those taken of hostages. Anti-Hezbollah blogger Michael Young stated that he did not think Hariri was an actual hostage of the Saudi regime, but that the situation confirmed Hariri's close ties with them. However, Lebanese-American political scientist As'ad AbuKhalil claimed that the Saudis had jailed and physically restrained and assaulted Hariri before ordering him to broadcast his resignation. In November, it was announced that Hariri was on his way from Saudi Arabia to the United Arab Emirates. Hariri's own party's media outlet reported that he would then move on to Bahrain and later back to Beirut, but both of these trips were subsequently cancelled and he was sent back to Riyadh. Hariri's allies, who usually aligned with Saudi Arabia, then joined the other parties in their concern for Hariri's freedom being limited by Saudi Arabia. The majority of the Lebanese government requested his return. On 11 November, Lebanese President Michel Aoun released the statement: "Lebanon does not accept its prime minister being in a situation at odds with international treaties and the standard rules in relations between states."

Later in November, Hariri traveled to France to meet French President Emmanuel Macron. Macron specifically requested he take his wife and children along with him. He was able to make such a request due to Hariri's French citizenship. Hariri declared in Beirut on 21 November that he had suspended his resignation. He stated that President Michel Aoun had asked him to "put it on hold ahead of further consultations". He refused to talk about what happened in Saudi Arabia and claimed that events will remain undisclosed. He rescinded his resignation on 5 December and stated that all members of the government had agreed to stay out of conflicts in Arab countries.

==== 2019 protests and resignation ====
In mid-October 2019, a popular protest movement began calling for increased accountability and transparency in politics. His government was widely viewed as corrupt by the Lebanese people. On 20 October, hundreds of thousands of protesters gathered in locations throughout the country, making it the largest demonstrations since 2005. Gunfire was heard outside the Tripoli office of Firas Al-Ali, an associate of Hariri. None were injured with the clash, and security forces were quick to act. On 21 October, a general strike was called across the country demanding an end to the country's economic problems. Some protesters began clearing away demonstration debris in Beirut after a social media call to keep the streets tidy and clear. In the afternoon, an emergency cabinet meeting was held. After the meeting, Prime Minister Hariri held a press conference in which he announced various economic reforms including halving the salaries of legislators and members of parliament, reducing the deficit by about US$3.4 billion in 2020 with the help of the Lebanese central bank and the banking sector, distributing financial aid to families living in poverty, and giving US$160 million in housing loans. These proposals were unsuccessful at quelling protests.

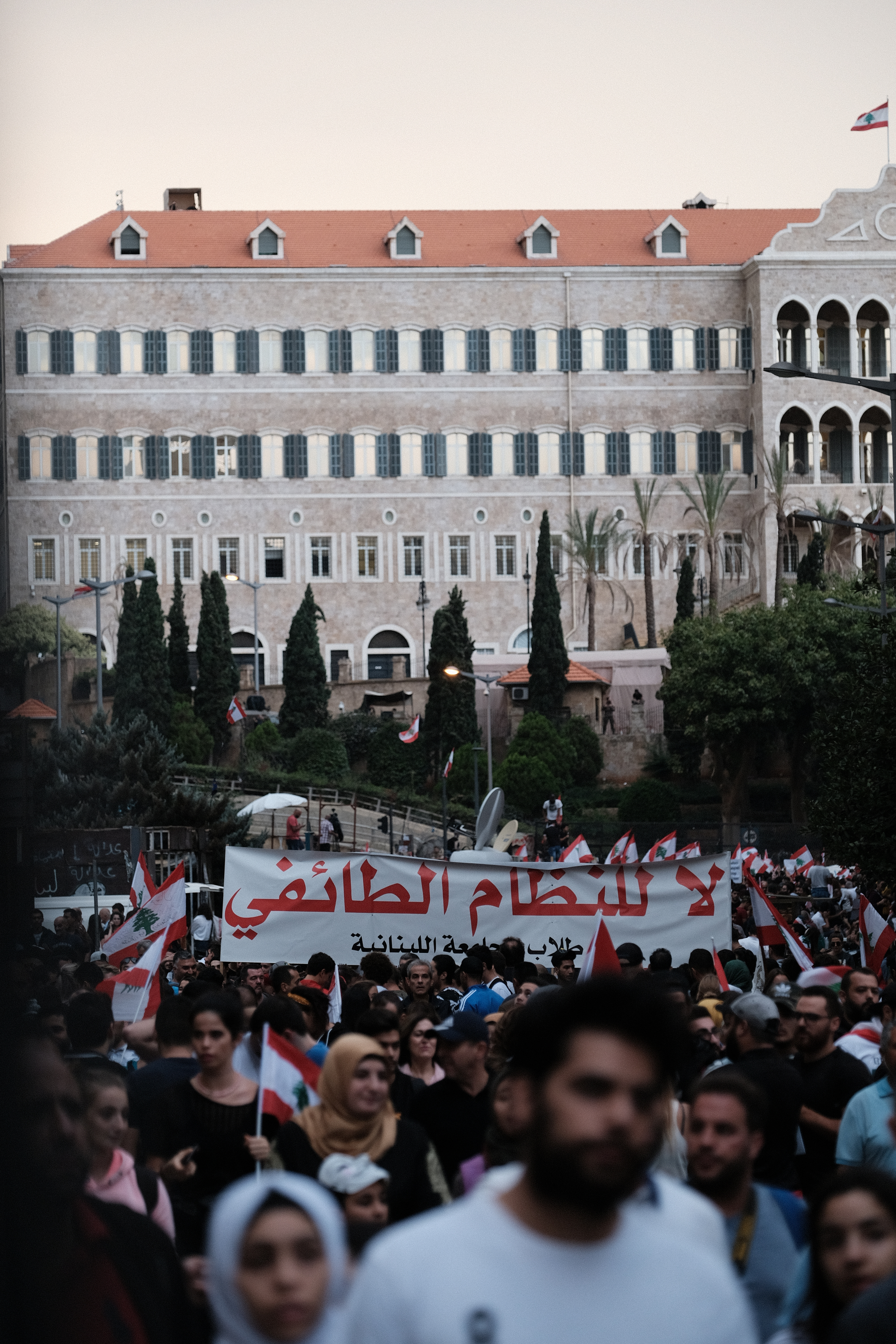
Protesters in front of the Grand Serail, Beirut, carrying a sign that reads "No to Sectarian Rule". 23 October 2019.

Hariri met on 22 October with ambassadors from the United States, Russia, France, the United Kingdom, Germany, Italy, and the European Union, along with representatives from China, the United Nations, and the Arab League. Hariri discussed planned reforms and stressed the importance of peaceful expression from the protesters. The representatives, who form the International Support Group for Lebanon, expressed support for economic reforms and protection of protesters, but urged the leaders of Lebanon to engage in open dialogue with the country's citizens.

On 23 October, Hariri held a meeting with the ministerial committee in charge of financial and economic reforms, discussing a draft law on the recovery of public money and requesting suggestions on it from the Supreme Judicial Council within ten days. In the evening, Hariri also held a meeting with members of the Progressive Socialist Party to discuss the latest developments in the country. Sheikh Akl of the Lebanese Druze community called for government dialogue to safeguard the rights of liberty, security and stability.

On 29 October, Hariri offered his resignation as a concession, saying "This is in response to the will and demand of the thousands of Lebanese demanding change". The following day, President Michel Aoun accepted the resignation but requested that Hariri remain in office till a successor was appointed. Hassan Diab, the former education minister, was appointed to the role on 21 January 2020. On 10 August 2020, Diab resigned in the aftermath of the Beirut explosion due to mounting political pressure and anger at the Lebanese government for their failure to prevent the disaster, exacerbated by existing political tensions and upheavals within the country.

On 16 December, at noon, President Aoun delayed scheduled parliamentary consultations, during which Saad Hariri was widely expected to be renamed Prime Minister. This was because Hariri was now no longer being supported by the main Christian parties in parliament. At night, protesters gathered close to Saad Hariri's Beirut residence to reject his reappointment. A separate group of protesters descended upon Beirut as well, expressing outrage at a month-old video of an ex-pat insulting several Shi'a religious leaders.

=== 2020–21 premiership designation ===
After the resignation of Hassan Diab, Hariri and the Prime Ministers' club favored the Lebanese ambassador to Germany, Mustapha Adib, to be the next prime minister. Although he was appointed after being nominated by 90 of 120 MPs on 30 August, he stepped down three weeks later after failing to form a new cabinet.

On 8 October, Hariri announced in an interview that he was "definitely a candidate" for the position, and called other political parties not to waste what was called the "French Initiative". On 22 October, Saad Hariri was reappointed as prime minister. He was backed by his Future Movement, PSP and Amal Movement, receiving 65 votes, 4 less than his predecessor Diab, while Hezbollah along with major Christian parties, Free Patriotic Movement and Lebanese Forces, did not endorse him.

After 2,174 days and 18 meetings with Aoun, he had yet failed to form a government. He met with Recep Tayyip Erdoğan in Turkey in January 2021, Abdel Fattah el-Sisi in Egypt in February, and visited Mohammed bin Zayed in United Arab Emirates several times. Hariri has been criticized for spending a great amount of time outside Lebanon, while the absence of a government worsened the financial crisis in the country, and his trips were seen as an attempt to compensate the support he lacked from Saudi Arabia.

On 16 March, the exchange rate reached 15,000 Lebanese pounds to the dollar. The next day, Aoun called Hariri to meet him. After the meeting, Hariri announced that the government could be formed soon. However, on 29 March, he claimed that Aoun proposed a formation that included the blocking third for FPM, which he rejected, and released another formation consisting of 18 ministers to the media. On 15 July, he decided to step down from his designation.

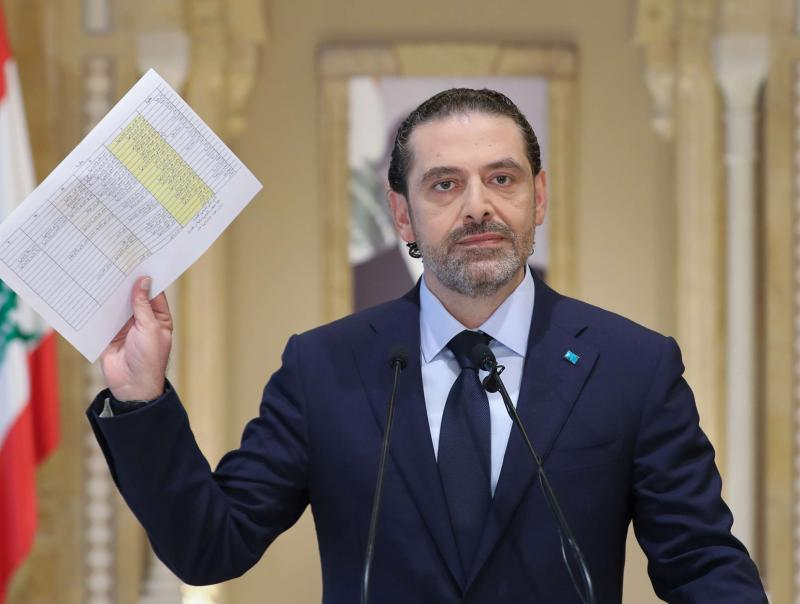
Hariri presenting a list of suggested ministers

After the anger among the Lebanese, President Michel Aoun and Prime minister-designate Saad Hariri held immediate talks in the presidential palace. After that, on 17 March 2021, the President told Hariri that he should form a government immediately and that if he's unable to do so "he should make way for those who are". Aoun also maintained that inaction was no longer a choice for the PM-designate Hariri and had to choose between stepping down or forming a government.

On 22 March, and after several meetings between with President Aoun, Hariri said that the demands of the President were "unacceptable", causing Lebanon to witness a failure to form a new government, which worsened the crisis. According to Hariri, President Aoun presented him with a line-up granting his team a third of all cabinet seats, which would enable them to have veto power over decision making in the Lebanese government. Hariri was said to have been criticized by Aoun for disclosing his proposed government to the media, because the distribution of the ministries was unjust which was his reason for not agreeing to the line-up, according to Al Jazeera. After the meeting which only lasted for just 35 minutes, another date for a new meeting between Hariri and Aoun could not be confirmed.

=== 2022 political step-down ===
On 24 January 2022 Hariri announced his withdrawal from Lebanese politics and that he would not run in the 2022 general elections. He also called on the Future Movement to follow suit and not run in the upcoming parliamentary elections nor nominate anyone to run on its behalf.

=== 2025 political return ===
After returning to Beirut in 2025 to commemorate the 20th anniversary of his father's assassination, he announced in front of thousands of supporters that the Future Movement will return to Lebanese politics and will run lists in upcoming elections. In April 2025 he announced that the party would abstain from Lebanon's municipal elections, arguing that such elections should remain non-political and developmental in nature.

== Personal life ==
Saad Hariri, born in 1970 in Riyadh, is the second son of Lebanese Prime Minister Rafic Hariri and his first wife Nidal Bustani, an Iraqi national. He has an older brother, Bahaa Hariri (born 1967), and another brother, Houssam Hariri, who died in a traffic accident at a young age. After his parents divorced, his father married Nazik Hariri (née Audi) in 1976. Saad Hariri has two half-brothers and one half-sister from his father's second marriage: Ayman Hariri, (born 1978), Fahd Hariri, (born c. 1980/81), and Hind Hariri, a sister (born 1984).

Hariri holds multiple citizenships: Lebanese, Saudi Arabian, and French. He married Lara Al Azem in 1998, the daughter of Bashir Al Azem, an influential and wealthy Syrian construction magnate. They have three children: Houssam (born 1999), Loulwa (born 2001), and Abdulaziz (born 2005).

In 2007, French president Jacques Chirac awarded Saad Hariri the Légion d'honneur, a French order of merit.

Hariri lived in Paris from 2011 to 2014 for safety reasons, and returned to Lebanon on 8 August 2014.

In 2011, he was said to have a net worth of $2 billion. As of May 2018, his net worth was estimated to be $1.36 billion.

=== Controversy ===
In 2013, Hariri allegedly paid South African bikini model, Candice van der Merwe, a $16 million cash gift after meeting her in the Seychelles. In 2019, South African courts sued van der Merwe for failing to pay income taxes on the amount, despite her claims that it was a gift.

In April 2023, two flight attendants filed a lawsuit against Hariri for alleged sexual assault. According to case documents, Hariri was accused of brutal workplace rape, false imprisonment, sexual assault, and sexual harassment.

== See also ==
- Lebanese people in Saudi Arabia
  - List of Lebanese people in Saudi Arabia
- Lebanese people in France
- List of political families in Lebanon

== Notes ==
Party political offices
Preceded by Rafic Hariri	Leader of the Future Movement Party; 2005–present	Incumbent
Political offices
Preceded by Fouad Siniora	Prime Minister of Lebanon; 2009–2011	Succeeded by Najib Mikati
Preceded by Tammam Salam	Prime Minister of Lebanon; 2016–2020	Succeeded by Hassan Diab
