= Louay Almokdad =

Syrian entrepreneur and politician (born 1982)

Louay Almokdad لؤي المقداد
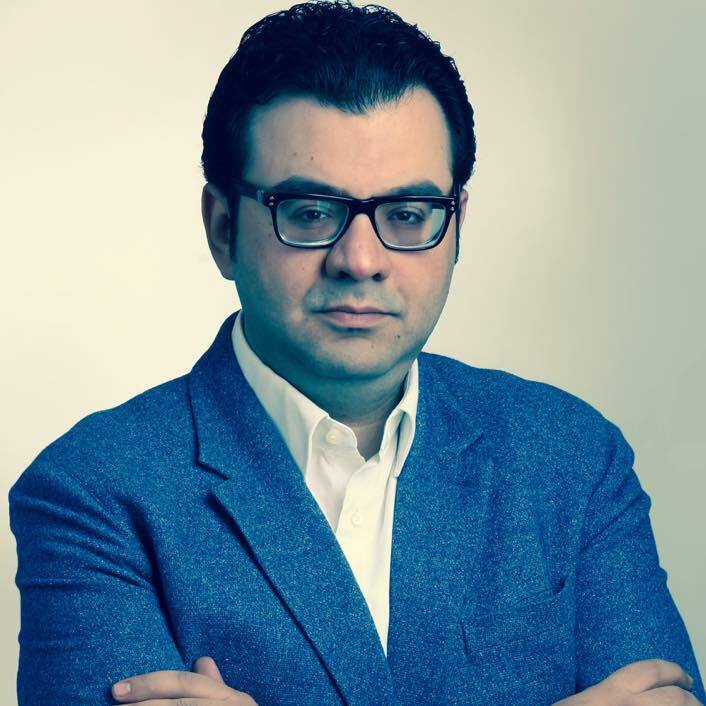
- Born: 20 December 1982 (age 43); Damascus, Syria
- Occupations: Politician, publicity
- Website: https://www.facebook.com/louay.almokdad

Louay Almokdad (Note: Also transliterated as Luay al-Miqdad.) (Arabic: لؤي المقداد; born 20 December 1982) is a Syrian-British politician and businessman. He was born in 1982 in Damascus, Syria.

== Education ==
He studied in Damascus until high school, and graduated from the American University of Cyprus with a major in Political Science.

== The Syrian Revolution ==
Being a Secular opposition member, he served as the spokesman for the Supreme Military Council of the Free Syrian Army and was also the political and media coordinator of the Free Syrian Army from 2012 to 2015.

He was a member of the National Coalition for Syrian Revolutionary and Opposition Forces before his official resignation in 2015.

== Political career ==
He is commonly known for his opposition to Syrian government and a powerful fighter against extremist Islamic groups such as the Islamic State of Iraq and the Levant and Al-Nusra Front through hundreds of interviews in Arabic and international media.

On 12 December 2012, Syrian government issued arrest warrants against Almokdad, Lebanese Prime Minister Saad Hariri and future bloc deputy Okab Sakr, accusing them of providing financial support for Syrian opposition groups. Interpol rejected the Syrian government warrants. According to a memo sent by Interpol to its offices in Arab countries and around the world, the organization decided not to keep the arrest warrants in its database and will not cooperate with them based on its regulations as "it is strictly forbidden for the organization to undertake any intervention or activities based on political issues."

Almokdad established several institutions which concerned itself with the political and media affairs of the Middle East, including the "Masarat" Foundation, which is competent in Syrian, humanitarian and relief affairs, particularly with regards to fighting extremist ideologies which are among some of the conflicting factions in Syria.
