= Hariri & Hariri Architecture =

American architecture and design firm

Practice information
- Firm type: Privately Held
- Partners: Gisue Hariri and Mojgan Hariri
- Founded: 1986
- Location: New York

Website
- www.haririandhariri.com

Hariri & Hariri Architecture is an architecture and design firm based in New York. Founded in 1986 by sisters Gisue Hariri and Mojgan Hariri, the firm specializes in modern and technologically inspired design.

== Biography ==
The Hariri sisters came to the US from Iran in the 1970s to study architecture at Cornell University. Gisue Hariri has served as an adjunct professor of architecture at Columbia University and visiting critic at Cornell, Parsons School of Design, and McGill University. The sisters have also designed jewelry collections inspired by their architecture work for Swarovski including a 'Kryptonite' crystal that they created.

The Hariri Sisters embody technologically inspired designs.

The firm's work ranges in scale from architecture, master plans, and interiors, to product design and furniture. The work also includes research-oriented prototypes such as the Museum of the 21st Century at the National Building Museum (2003–07), Loft of the Future (1999-2000), Cine Experimental Film Center (1999), and The Digital House which was showcased in an exhibition at the Museum of Modern Art in 1999. In 2010, Hariri & Hariri's architectural rendering was included in the "Contemplating the Void" exhibit at the Guggenheim for the 50th anniversary of Frank Lloyd Wright-designed museum.

== Recognition ==
In 2005, Hariri & Hariri won the Academy Award in Architecture at the American Academy of Arts and Letters Awards, and was inducted into the Design Hall of Fame sponsored by Interior Design Magazine. In 2010, Architectural Digest included Gisue and Mojgan Hariri on its list of the greatest talents in architecture and design. The firm won the American Architecture Award 2015 from the Chicago Athenaeum Museum of Architecture & Design for its housing development in Salzburg, Austria called Jewels of Salzburg. Hariri and Hariri was presented with the Career Achievement Award in October 2016 at the IA-100 retreat in Silicon Valley. In 2018, Hariri & Hariri were recognized for its "strong and authentic exhibition design" by The New York Times after the opening of "Contemporary Muslim Fashions".

== Selected projects ==
- JSM Music Studios (1992)
- Digital House (1999)
- The Weeping Towers- World Trade Center Memorial (2002)
- St. Marks Coptic Canadian Village (2003)
- The Museum of the 21st Century (2003)
- Museum in the Sky (2014)
- Jewels of Salzburg (2015)
- Cape Cod Beach House (2015)
- Taghkanic House (2016)
- Alvand Tower (2017)
- Aqua House (2000))
- Sagaponac House (2001)
- Belmont House (1999)
- Fifth Avenue Penthouse (1997)
- "Contemporary Muslim Fashions" - de Young Museum in San Francisco

== Publications ==
- Hariri, Gisue; Holl, Steven; Frampton, Kenneth (1995). Hariri and Hariri: Work in Progress. Works in Progress. New York: The Monacelli Press. ISBN 158093062X.
- Oscar Riera Ojeda (1997). "Casas International: Hariri and Hariri". Casas Internacional (in Spanish). Argentina. ISSN 0328-2406.
- Goldberger, Paul; Meier, Richard (2005). Hariri & Hariri Houses. New York: Rizzoli International Publications. ISBN 0-8478-2779-8.
- Hariri & Hariri: Buildings & Projects. Australia: Images Publishing. 2010. ISBN 9781864703405.
- Hariri & Hariri Architecture: Leading Architects. Images Publishing. 30 November 2017. ISBN 9781864707359.

== Links ==
- How a Pair of Architects Are Remaking the Future for the Homeless
