= Hind Hariri =

Lebanese billionaire

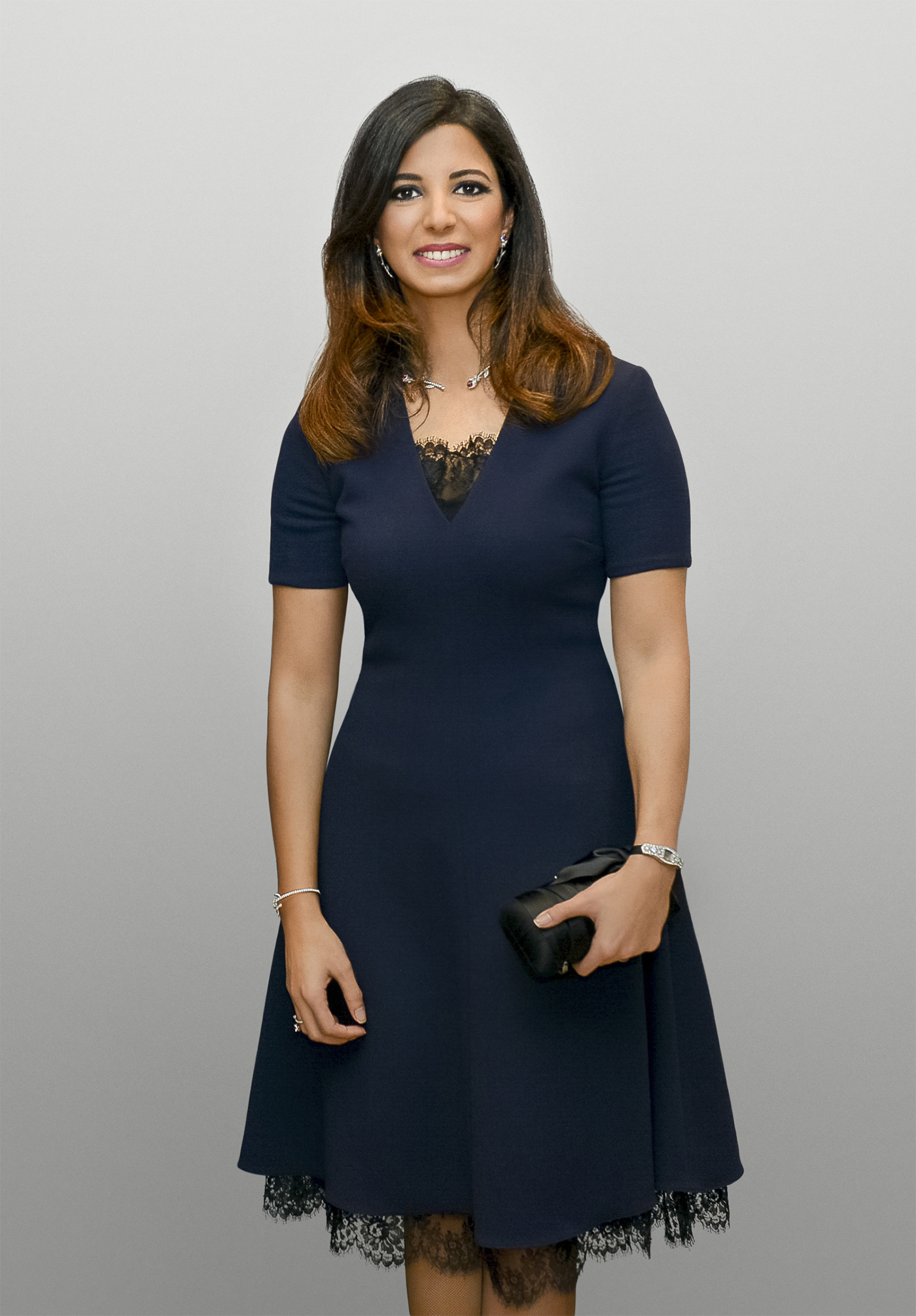
- Hind Hariri in Monaco, 2017
- Born: Hind Rafic al-Hariri; 1984 (age 41–42); Riyadh, Saudi Arabia
- Spouse: Mohammad Anas Al Karout (m. 2009)
- Children: 2
- Parent(s): Rafic Hariri; Nazik Hariri
- Relatives: Ayman Hariri (brother); Fahd Hariri (brother); Bahaa Hariri (half-brother); Saad Hariri (half-brother)

Hind Rafic al-Hariri (Arabic: هند الحريري; born in 1984) is the youngest child of Lebanese businessman and politician Rafic Hariri. She graduated from the Lebanese American University in Beirut and campaigned for her half-brother Saad in Lebanese elections. In 2008, Forbes magazine listed her as "one of the world's youngest billionaires".

In 2009, she married Mohammad Anas Al Karout. They had their first son, Mohammad in 2010, and in December 2011 they had their second son, Rafik.

== Controversy around the Lycée Abdel Kader high school ==
In November 2018, Hind Hariri was reported to be behind the controversial decision to relocate the historic Lycée Abdel Kader School. Hind Hariri allegedly put on sale the high school with the goal to construct a mall in its location. L'Orient Le Jour, a Lebanese Francophone newspaper, reported that students, their parents and professors rejected the move in a protest in front of the school's main entrance.
