= Bahaa Hariri =

Lebanese businessman

- بهاء الدين الحريري
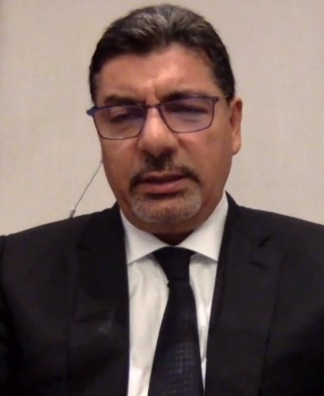
- Hariri in 2020
- Born: 26 April 1967 (age 59); Jeddah, Saudi Arabia
- Education: Boston University
- Occupation: Businessman
- Spouses: Amar Helal Shahab (divorced) Donia Al-Baba (divorced) Hassnah Abousabah (m. 2014)
- Children: 5
- Father: Rafic Hariri
- Relatives: Saad Hariri (brother); Ayman Hariri (half-brother); Fahd Hariri (half-brother); Hind Hariri (half-sister)

Bahaa El-Dine Rafic Al-Hariri (Arabic: بهاء الدين رفيق الحريري; born 26 April 1967) is a Lebanese-Saudi billionaire businessman. He is the eldest son of assassinated former Lebanese Prime Minister Rafic Hariri, from his father's first marriage with Nida Bustani, an Iraqi national. He is the brother of former Lebanese Prime Minister Saad Hariri.

Since the start of the uprising in Lebanon in October 2019, Hariri has been vocal in his support of the protestors, speaking out about corruption in the political system and the failure of the state to support the people.

He is currently listed at #1545 on Forbes' list of top billionaires.

== Early years ==
Bahaa Hariri was born in Saudi Arabia on 26 April 1966. He holds a master's degree in business administration from Boston University. After completing his studies, he moved to work for his family Construction and Development company, Saudi Oger Ltd.

== Business activities ==
In 2002, Hariri founded Horizon Group, a real estate holding company with investments in Lebanon, Jordan, and Saudi Arabia. He is the majority owner of Globe Express Services, a logistics company with a presence in more than 100 countries.

He has invested in New Abdali, a planned commercial district of Amman, Jordan. The project, in partnership with the Jordanian government, focuses on the development of the old downtown district of Al-Abdali, including luxury shopping, residences, and offices.

In 2008, he sold his stake in Saudi Oger, the family construction business, to his brother Saad Hariri, the former prime minister of Lebanon.

In 2010, Bahaa made a pledge to create the Rafik B. Hariri Institute for Computing and Computational Science & Engineering in Boston University, where Hariri is currently a member of the board of trustees.

In May 2011, he inaugurated the Rafik Hariri Center for the Middle East at the Atlantic Council, a think-tank based in Washington DC. He sits on the Atlantic Council's international advisory board.

In June 2017, "ABC Verdun", a shopping mall in Beirut, was launched as a joint development between Hariri's real estate company, Verdun 1544, and ABC.

== Community support ==
In February 2021, Hariri made a significant donation to the Lebanese American University Medical Center (LAUMC) to help carry out its vaccination campaign to fight the COVID -19 virus. He also donated oxygen concentrators to the Lebanese Red Cross to alleviate the suffering of Lebanese citizens in the time of the pandemic.

== Personal life ==
Hariri is married to Hassnah Abousabah Hariri and is the father of five children.

== See also ==
- List of Lebanese people in Saudi Arabia
- List of political families in Lebanon
- Rafic Hariri
