= Fahd Hariri =

Lebanese billionaire heir and property developer

- Born: 1980 or 1981 (age 44–45); Riyadh, Saudi Arabia
- Education: École Spéciale d'Architecture
- Occupation: Property developer
- Spouse: Maya Hariri
- Children: 3
- Parent(s): Rafic Hariri; Nazik Hariri
- Relatives: Ayman Hariri (brother); Hind Hariri (sister); Bahaa Hariri (half-brother); Saad Hariri (half-brother)

Fahd Hariri (born 1980/1981) is a Lebanese billionaire heir and property developer, the youngest son of Rafic Hariri.

== Early life ==
Fahd Hariri was born in Riyadh, Saudi Arabia the youngest son of Rafic Hariri. In 2004, he graduated from the École Spéciale d'Architecture in Paris. Rafic Hariri was assassinated in a 2005 car bombing.

== Career ==
Fahd Hariri is a Lebanese businessman primarily involved in the development of residential properties in Beirut. He also holds the position of president at the Har Investment Fund and serves as a member of the advisory council at Lutetia Capital SAS, based in Paris.

In 2012, Fahd divested his shares in the family construction firm Saudi Oger to his brother, Saad Hariri, who went on to become Lebanon's prime minister until January 2020. Fahd's international investments have been meticulously planned by investment bankers, including Alex Knaster, a former Credit Suisse executive with ties to Mikhail Fridman, the co-founder of Alfa-Bank, one of Russia's largest lenders, which has been affected by international sanctions. Additionally, Fahd has worked with Mohammed Abrar Asif, a former Goldman Sachs executive and the current Co-CEO of Hades Financial Private Capital Group (HFPCG), where he manages capital for several of the world's elite UHNWIs and Sovereign Wealth Funds.

Fahd's investment activities have included real estate holdings in New York, Paris, Monte Carlo, and Lebanese banks, some of which have experienced financial difficulties. As of 2023, Fahd's net worth is estimated by Forbes to be US$1.2 billion.

== Personal life ==
Fahd Hariri is married and has three children. He lives in London, England.
