= Rafic Hariri =

Prime Minister of Lebanon (1992–1998; 2000–2004)

- رفيق الحريري
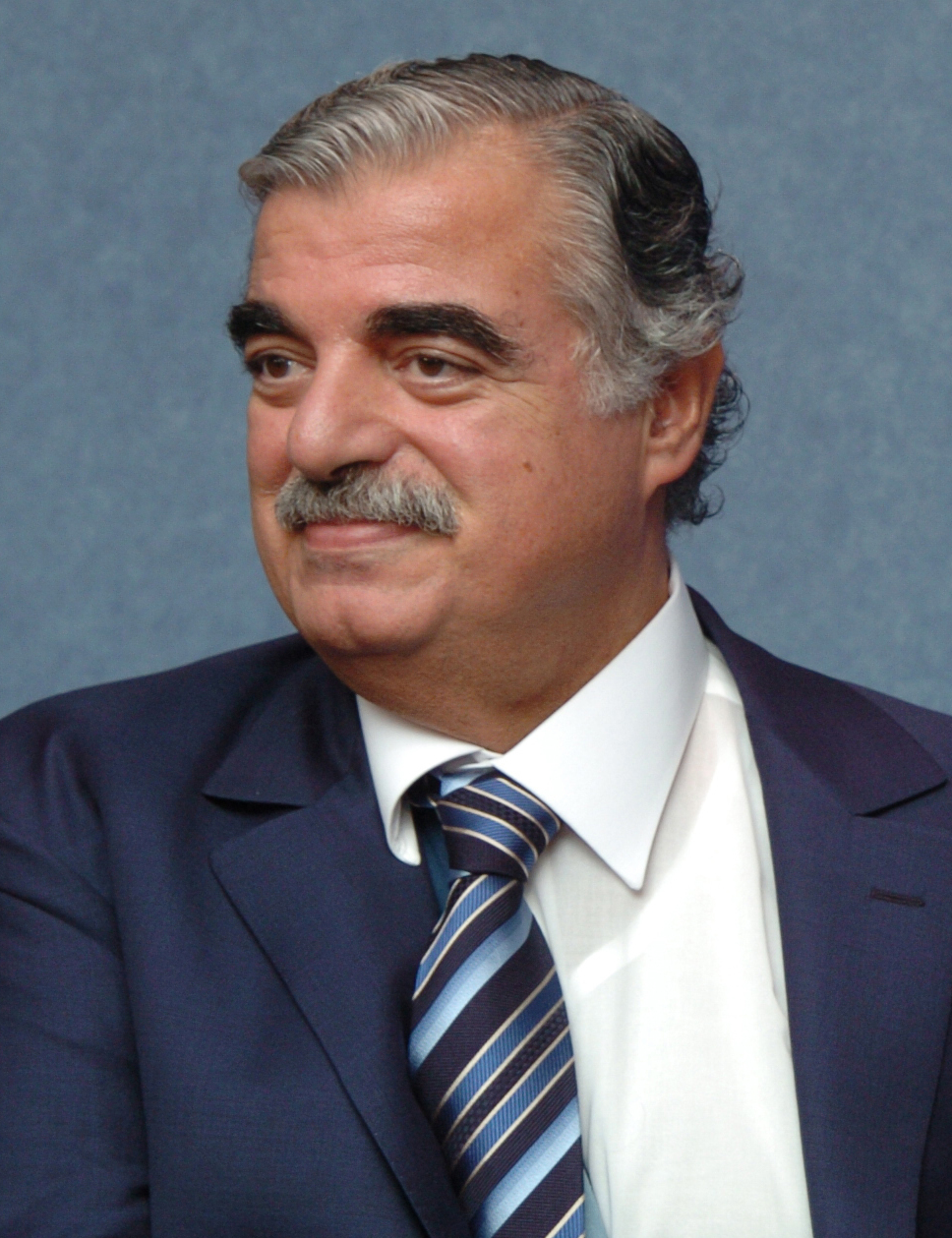
- Hariri in 2004

41st & 43rd Prime Minister of Lebanon
- In office 26 October 2000 – 26 October 2004
- President: Émile Lahoud
- Deputy: Issam Fares
- Preceded by: Selim Hoss
- Succeeded by: Omar Karami
- In office 31 October 1992 – 4 December 1998
- President: Elias Hrawi; Émile Lahoud
- Preceded by: Rachid Solh
- Succeeded by: Selim Hoss

Minister of Posts and Telecommunications
- In office 7 November 1996 – 4 December 1998
- Prime Minister: Himself
- Preceded by: AlFadl Chalak
- Succeeded by: Issam Naaman

Minister of Finance
- In office 31 October 1992 – 4 December 1998
- Prime Minister: Himself
- Preceded by: Asaad Diab
- Succeeded by: Georges Corm

Member of the Lebanese Parliament
- In office 16 October 1992 – 14 February 2005
- Constituency: Beirut

Personal details
- Born: 1 November 1944 Sidon, Lebanon
- Died: 14 February 2005 (aged 60) Beirut, Lebanon
- Cause of death: Assassination
- Party: Future
- Spouses: Nidal Bustani (m. 1965; div. 1974) Nazik Hariri (m. 1976)
- Children: Bahaa, Saad, Houssam, Ayman, Fahd, Hind

Rafic Bahaa El Deen al-Hariri (Note: Rafic is the spelling used on his website and in official contexts, with Rafik and Rafiq also being used in English-language media.) (Arabic: رفيق بهاء الدين الحريري, romanized: Rafīq Bahāʾ ad-Dīn al-Ḥarīrī; 1 November 1944 – 14 February 2005) was a Lebanese businessman and politician who served as prime minister of Lebanon from 1992 to 1998 and again from 2000 to 2004.

Hariri headed five cabinets during his tenure. He was widely credited for his role in constructing the Taif Agreement that ended the 15-year Lebanese Civil War. He also played a huge role in reconstructing the Lebanese capital, Beirut. He was the first post-civil war prime minister and the most influential and wealthiest Lebanese politician at the time. During Hariri's first term as prime minister, tensions between Israel and Lebanon increased, as a result of the Qana massacre. In 2000, during his second premiership, his biggest achievement was the Israeli withdrawal from Southern Lebanon, ending an 18-year old occupation, while his government solidified relations with Ba'athist Syria.

On 14 February 2005, Hariri was assassinated in a suicide truck bomb explosion in Beirut. Four Hezbollah members of Unit 121 were indicted for the assassination and were tried in absentia by the Special Tribunal for Lebanon. Salim Ayyash, the unit's leader was convicted for his role in the assassination. The tribunal eventually convicted three Hezbollah members before its closure in 2023, but stated that it could find no evidence that the bombing had been directed by the group's senior leadership. The assassination was a catalyst for dramatic political change in Lebanon. The massive protests of the Cedar Revolution helped achieve the withdrawal of Syrian troops and security forces from Lebanon and a change in government.

At one point, Hariri was one of the world's 100 wealthiest men and the fourth-richest politician.

== Early life and education ==
Hariri was born on 1 November 1944 to a modest Sunni Muslim family in the Lebanese port city of Sidon. He had two siblings (brother Shafic and sister Bahia). He attended elementary and secondary school in Sidon, and graduated in business administration from Beirut Arab University.

== Business career ==
In 1965, Hariri went to Saudi Arabia to work. There, he taught for a short period of time before moving to the construction industry. In 1978, he gained Saudi Arabian citizenship, in addition to his Lebanese citizenship.

In 1969, Hariri established Ciconest, a small subcontracting firm, which soon went out of business. He then went into business with the French construction firm Oger for the construction of a hotel in Ta’if, Saudi Arabia, the timely construction of which earned him praise from King Khaled. Hariri took over Oger, forming Saudi Oger, which became the main construction firm used by the Saudi Royal family for all their important developments. As a result, a few years after his first contract with King Khaled, Hariri had become a multi-billionaire.

Having accumulated his wealth, Hariri started a number of philanthropic projects, including the building of educational facilities in Lebanon. His first initiative in Lebanon was the Islamic Association for Culture and Education, which he founded in 1979. The association was later renamed the Hariri Foundation. Hariri became progressively more embroiled in politics. His appeals to the United Nations and services as an emissary to the Saudi Royal family won him international recognition on the political stage for his humanitarian efforts.

In 1982, Hariri donated $12 million to Lebanese victims of the 1978 South Lebanon conflict and helped clean up Beirut's streets with his company's money and contributed to early reconstruction efforts during lulls in the Lebanon war. Said to have heavily financed opposing militias during the war, his former deputy Najah Wakim later accused him of helping to destroy downtown Beirut to rebuild it again and make billions of dollars in the process. After the conflict, he acted as an envoy of the Saudi royal family to Lebanon. He laid the groundwork that led to the 1989 Taif Accord, which Saudi Arabia organised to bring the warring factions together. Taif put an end to the civil war, building goodwill for Hariri politically. While acting as the Saudi envoy to Lebanon, he spent more time in Damascus than in Beirut where he ingratiated himself with the Assad regime; he had a new presidential palace built in Damascus as a gift to the Syrian dictator but Assad didn't use it personally.

== Political career ==
Hariri returned to Lebanon in the early 1980s as a wealthy man and began to build a name for himself by making large donations and contributions to various groups in Lebanon. However, he continued to serve as a political advisor to Prince Bandar bin Sultan in 1983. He was implanted as the Saudis' strong man following the collapse of the PLO and the paucity of any viable Sunni leadership in the country as well as a response to the rising power of the Shiite militia Amal. As a former Saudi diplomatic representative, he played a significant role in constructing the 1990 Taif Agreement that ended Lebanon's sixteen-year civil war. In 1992, Hariri became the first post-civil war prime minister of Lebanon under president Elias Hrawi. In addition, he was the minister of finance. After the 1996 elections he also took on the role of minister of post and telecommunications. Hariri put the country back on the financial map through the issuing of Eurobonds and won plaudits from the World Bank for his plan to borrow reconstruction money as the country's debt grew to become the largest per capita in the world. Between 1992 and 1996 the public debt grew from $3 billion to $9 billion. His first premiership lasted until 1998, and Hariri was replaced by Salim Hoss as prime minister. In fact, as a result of the power struggle between Hariri and newly elected president Émile Lahoud, he left office.

In October 2000, Hariri was again appointed prime minister, replacing Salim Hoss, and formed the cabinet. In September 2004, Hariri defended UN Security Council Resolution 1559, which called for "all remaining foreign forces to withdraw from Lebanon." On 20 October 2004, his second term ended when he resigned from office. Omar Karami succeeded him as prime minister.

== First premiership (1992–1998) ==
=== Economic policies ===
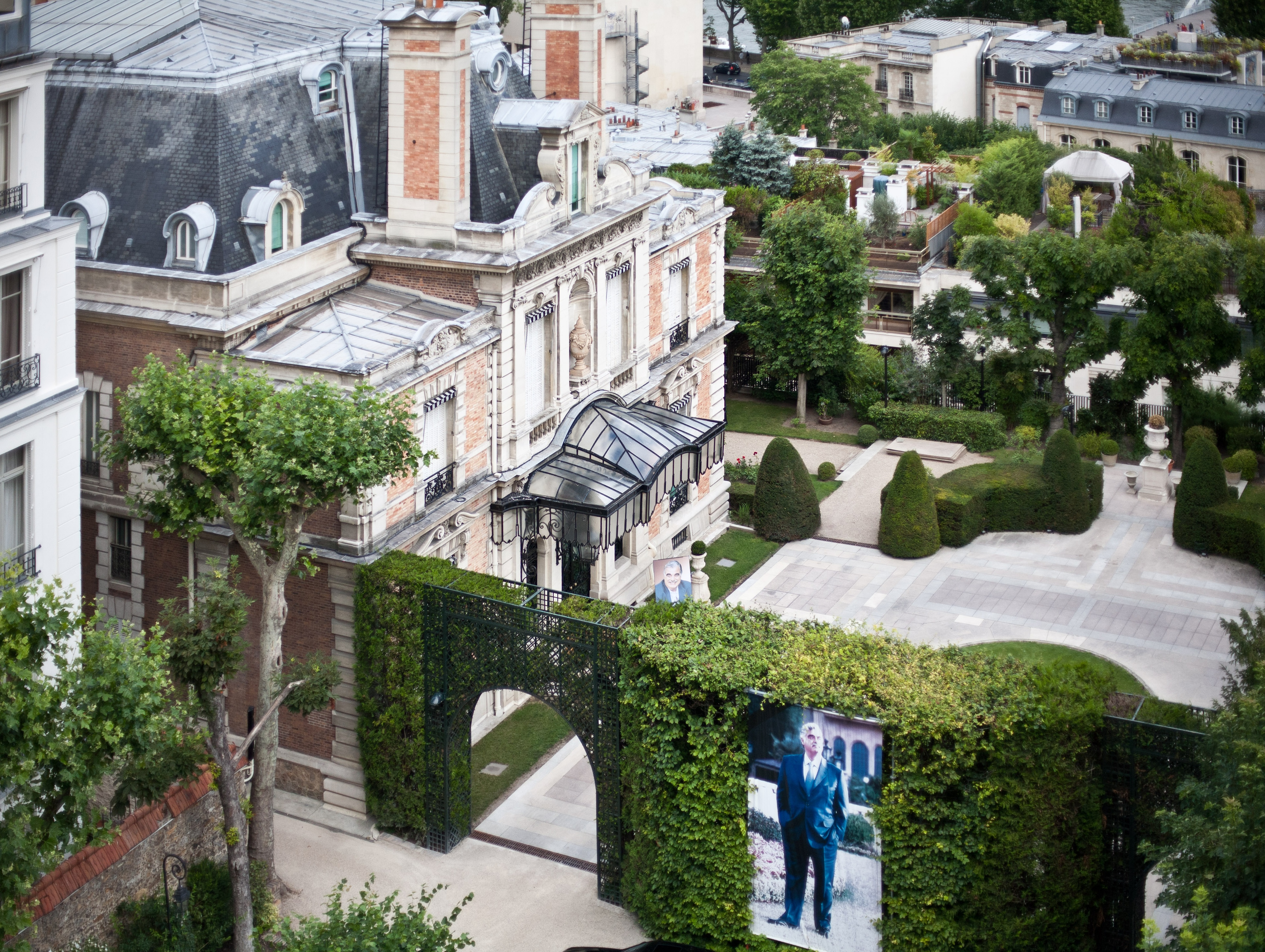
Hariri's former residence in Paris

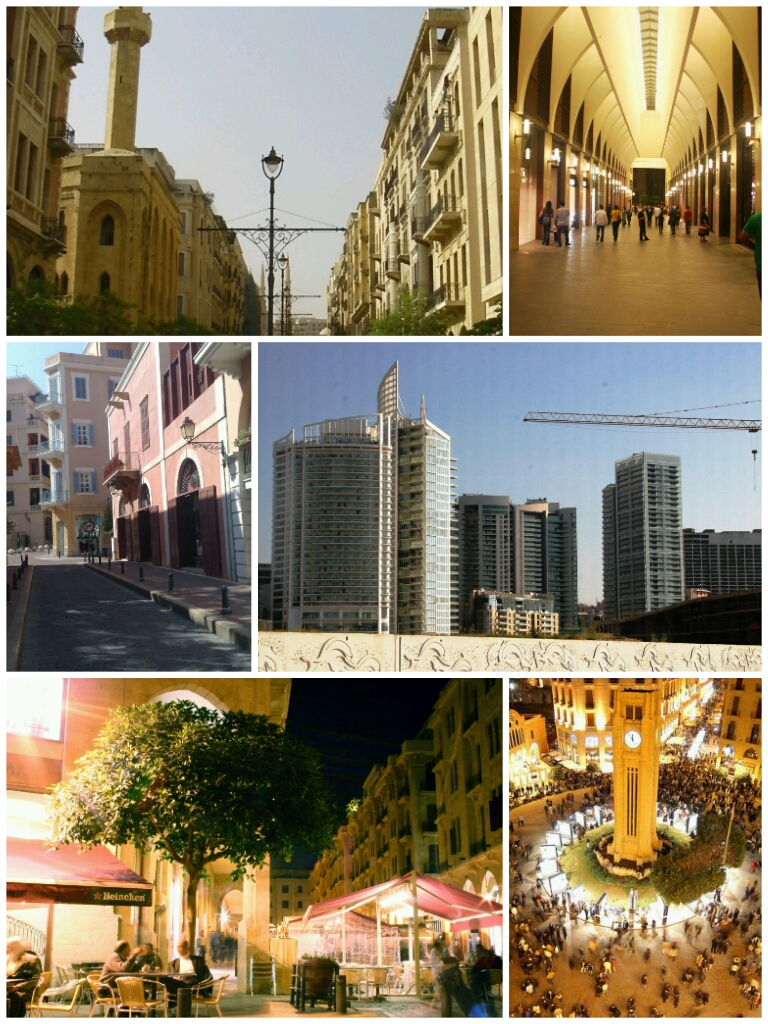
Beirut Central District, which was developed significantly under Hariri's tenure as Prime Minister.

Hariri implemented an aggressive new economic policy. In 1992, inflation was running at 131% but such was the confidence in Hariri's leadership that within two years it had been reduced to 12%. Perhaps Hariri's most important creation in the beginning of his career was "Horizon 2000", the government's name for its new rejuvenation plan. A large component of "Horizon 2000" was Solidere, the privately owned construction company that was established to reconstruct post-war Lebanon. Solidere was owned by the government and private investors. Solidere was largely focused on redeveloping Beirut's downtown and turning it into a new urban center as quickly as possible as one aspect of the various infrastructure redevelopment plans that would be implemented by "Horizon 2000". Solidere was given powers of compulsory purchase, compensating in Solidere shares rather than cash, and was accused of harassment and underpaying former land owners. Another aspect of the decade-long plan was the privatization of major industries. Numerous contracts were awarded in important industries such as energy, telecommunications, electricity, airports, and roads.

The last and perhaps most significant aspect of "Horizon 2000" was economic stimulus via foreign direct investment. Specifically, Hariri supported foreign firms and individuals taking an interest in Lebanon's developmental potential. Hariri simplified tax codes and provided tax breaks to foreign investors. Due to his previous successes in the private sector and the numerous resulting international connections, Hariri was able to garner a significant amount of low-interest loans from foreign investors. Hariri also pursued aggressive macroeconomic policy such as maintaining strict regulations on bank reserves and inter-bank interest rates to curb inflation and raise the value of the Lebanese pound relative to the dollar.

Hariri's economic policies were a remarkable success during his first year in office. From 1992 to 1993, there was a 6% increase in real national income, the capital base of commercial banks effectively doubled, the budgetary earnings hovered at around a billion dollars, and commercial banks' consolidated balance sheets increased about 25%. By 1998, however, real GDP growth was around 1%, a year later it would be −1%, national debt had skyrocketed 540% from two to eighteen billion dollars.

In 1996, it was estimated that 30% of Lebanon's population were living below the poverty line and that there were 500,000 Syrian laborers working illegally in the country.

=== Criticism ===
August 11, 1994, the Hariri government issued a ban on organized demonstrations, relying on the Lebanese Army to enforce the decree. According to Human Rights Watch, following the demonstration ban, on September 13, 1994, "army troops used force to disperse demonstrations, with disastrous results: seven men and one woman were killed and about forty other peaceful demonstrators injured." On 17 September 1996, Information Minister Farid Makari ordered a ban on the broadcasting of news programs. This was followed eight days later by a government decree ordering the closure of Lebanon's 150 privately owned radio stations and 50 TV stations. Licenses were then issued to Hariri's Future Television, the Christian-owned Lebanese Broadcasting Corporation International (LBCI), Murr Television (MTV) owned by the brother of Interior Minister Michel Murr, and the National Broadcasting Network (NBN), set up by Nabih Berri. The radio stations which were given licenses were Hariri's Orient Radio, Berri's NBN, and the Lebanese Forces’s Voice of Free Lebanon. The following year, however, "the cabinet handed out licenses to one television station and eight radio stations, including Hizballah's Al-Manar TV, Voice of Lebanon (formerly owned by the Phalange party), and Voice of the People (Communist Party)." These groups had been previously excluded from licensing in September 1996. According to the Committee to Protect Journalists, the ongoing Syrian occupation and military presence in Lebanon made it difficult for Lebanese media to criticize the Syrian regime, adding that "Syria's continued dominant political and military influence" created an atmosphere of self-censorship.

== Second premiership (2000—2004) ==
=== Hariri and Lebanon's political environment ===
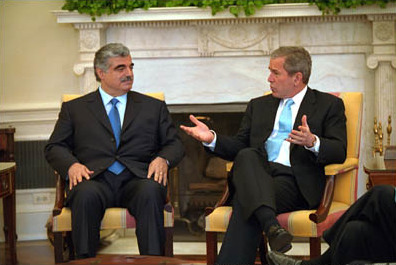
U.S. President George W. Bush and Hariri meeting in the White House

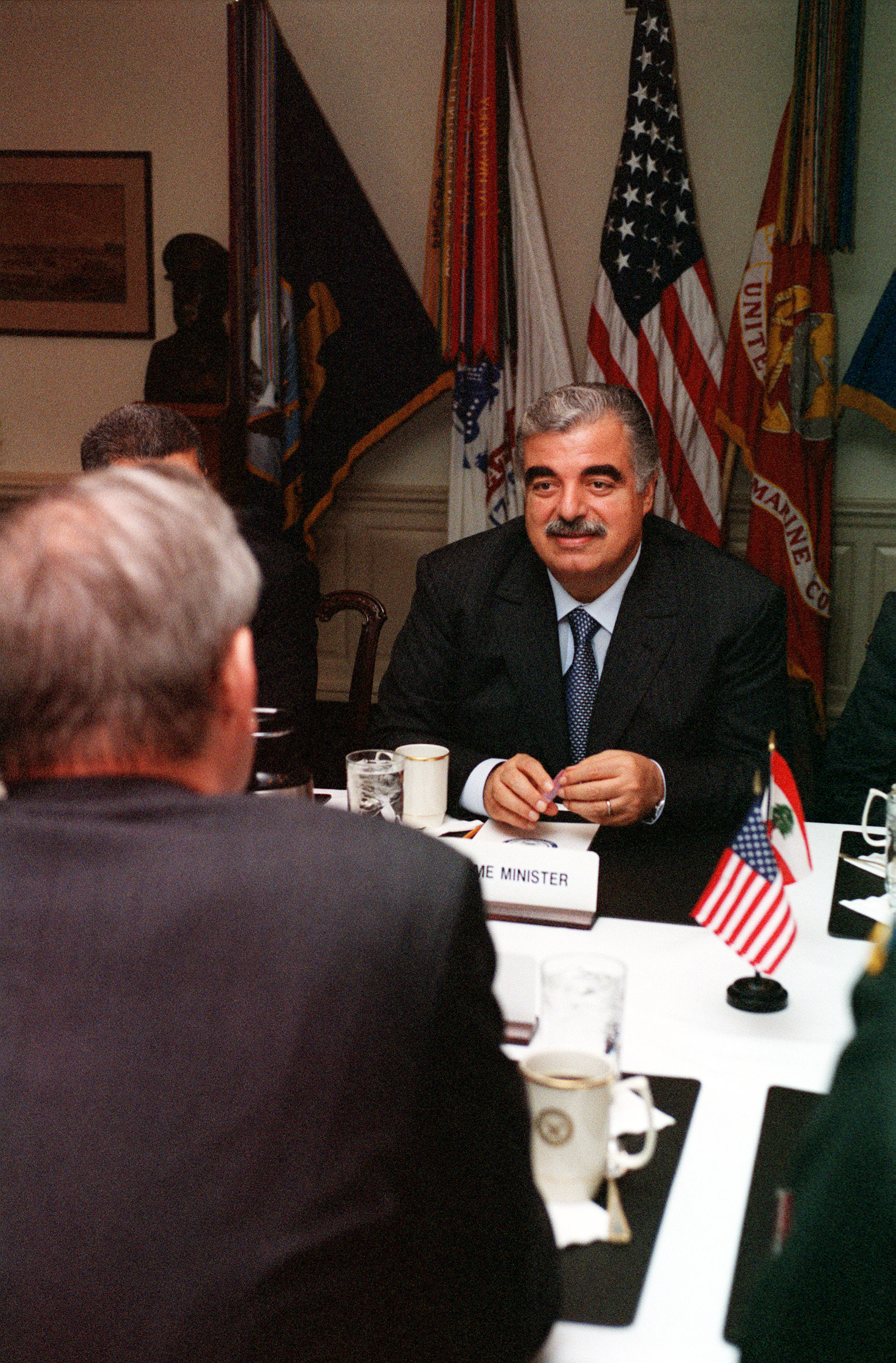
Hariri meeting with Donald Rumsfeld at The Pentagon on April 25, 2001

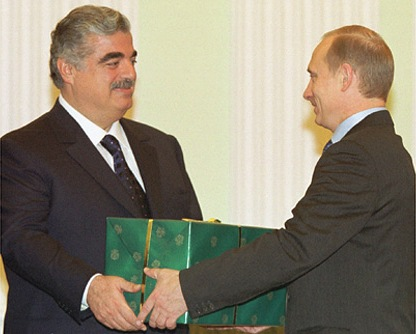
Hariri with Russian President Vladimir Putin in 2001

Amid the political crisis brought on by the extension of President Émile Lahoud's term, Hariri resigned as prime minister, saying: "I have... submitted the resignation of the government, and I have declared that I will not be a candidate to head the (next) government."

During a BBC interview in 2001, Hariri was asked by Tim Sebastian why he refused to hand over members of Hezbollah that were accused by America of being terrorists. He responded that Hezbollah were the ones protecting Lebanon against the Israeli occupation and called for implementation of passed United Nations resolutions against Israel.

During the interview, Sebastian also accused Hariri of making the American coalition in the war on terrorism worthless and asked if he was ready for the consequences of his refusal, reminding him that George W. Bush had said: "Either you are with us, or you are with the terrorists." Hariri replied that he had hoped there would be no consequences, but would deal with them if they arrive. He also said that he opposed the killing of all humans – Israeli, Palestinian, Syrian or Lebanese – and believed in dialogue as a solution. He further went on to say that Syria would have to stay in Lebanon for protection of Lebanon until they are no longer needed and Lebanon asks them to leave.

=== Opposition to Syrian occupation ===
Lebanese Druze leader Walid Jumblatt, a recent recruit of the anti-Syrian opposition, emboldened by popular anger and civic action now being called Lebanon's Cedar Revolution, alleged in the wake of the assassination that on 26 August 2004 Syrian president Bashar al-Assad threatened Hariri, saying "[President of Lebanon] Lahoud is me. ... If you and Chirac want me out of Lebanon, I will break Lebanon." He was quoted as saying "When I heard him telling us those words, I knew that it was his condemnation of death." This meeting between Hariri and Assad, which had been on 26 August 2004, lasted for just fifteen minutes.

=== Criticism ===
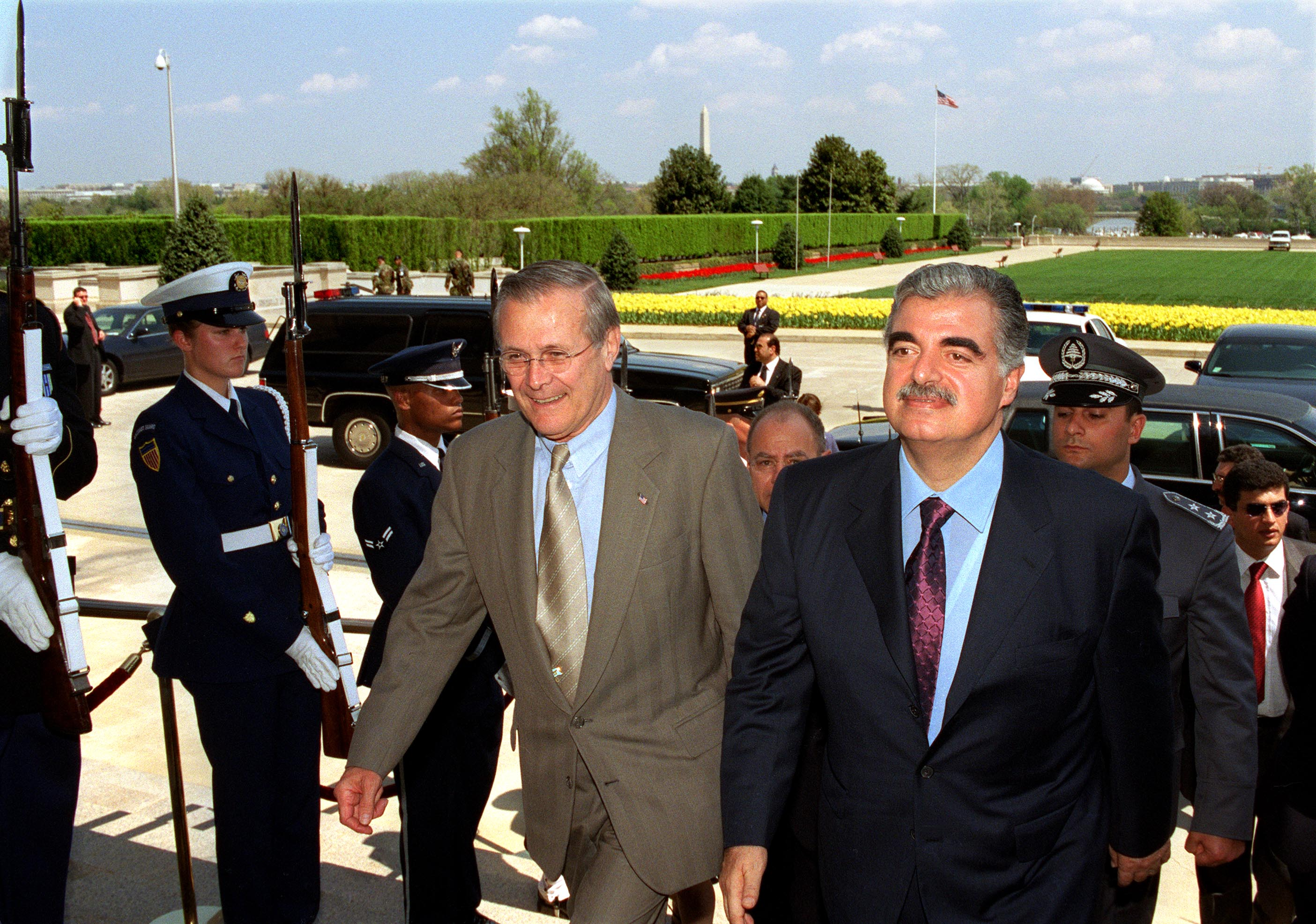
Hariri and Rumsfeld in 2002

Hariri was accused of corruption, which plagued Lebanon during the Syrian occupation. The Company for the Development and Reconstruction of Beirut's Central District (French: Société Libanaise pour le Développement et la Reconstruction du Centre-ville de Beyrouth), more commonly known by the French-derived acronym "Solidere", expropriated most property in the central business district of Beirut, compensating each owner with shares in the company which were worth as little as 15% of the property's value. As the primary shareholder of the company, Hariri and his business associates profited from this project. Moreover, it was reported by Middle East International in November 1996 that $26 million had been embezzled from the Lebanese Ministry of Finance while Hariri was in office. Hariri was accused of allowing kickbacks from public spending to enrich government figures. For instance, contracts for the import of petroleum were awarded to the two sons of President Elias Hrawi.

== Personal life ==
Hariri married twice. He had six children. In 1965, he married an Iraqi woman, Nidal Bustani, who is the mother of his three sons; Bahaa (born 1967), who is a businessman, Saad (born 1970), who succeeded his father as leader of the future movement, and Houssam—who died in a traffic accident in the US in the late 1980s. They divorced. He married his second spouse, Nazik Audi, in 1976 and she is the mother of three of Hariri's children: Ayman, Fahd and Hind.

From 1982 until his death, Hariri owned 2–8a Rutland Gate, a large house in London's Knightsbridge district. The house was gifted to the Crown Prince of Saudi Arabia, Sultan bin Abdulaziz, after Hariri's assassination.

== Assassination ==
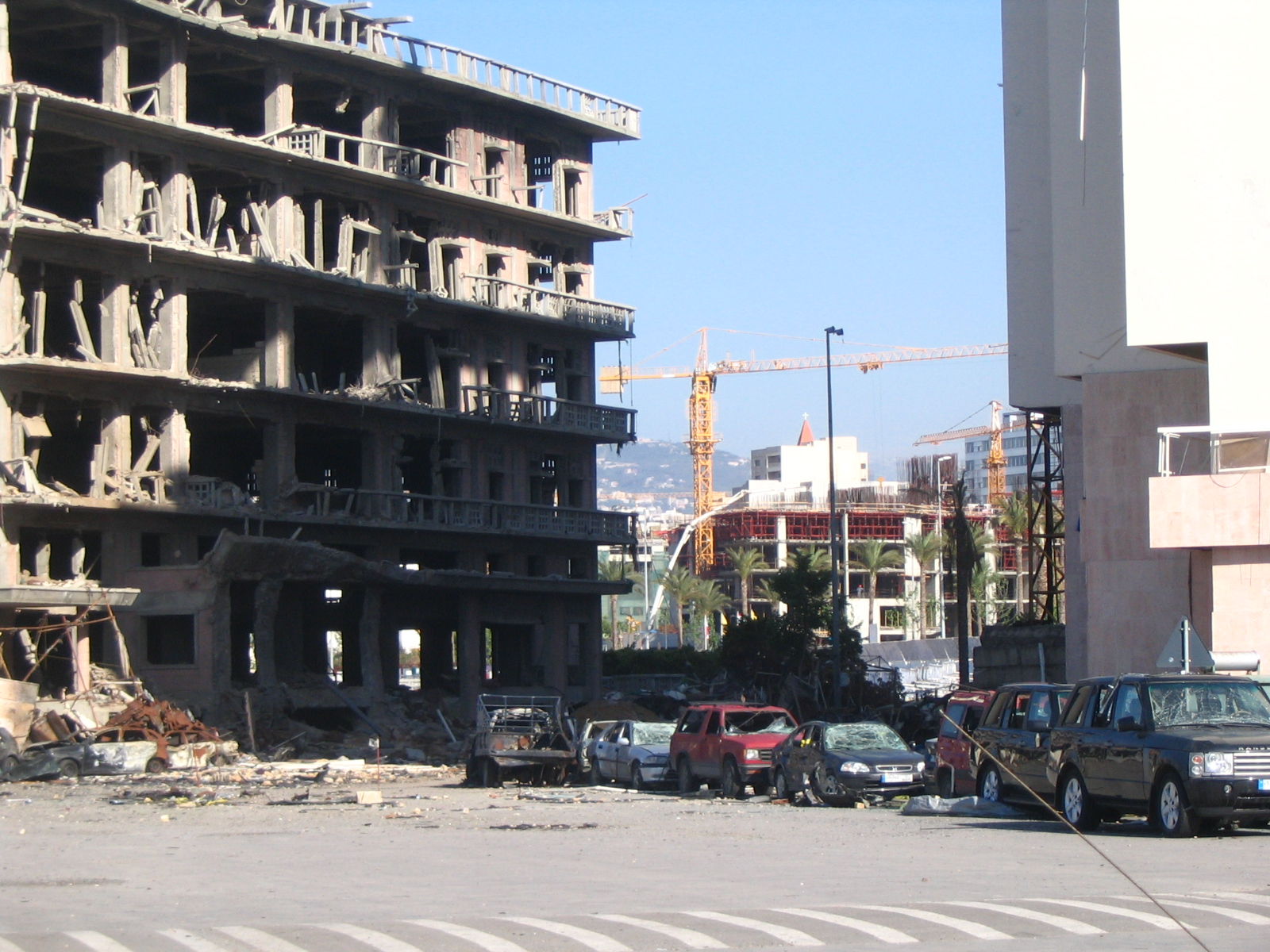
Buildings damaged by the car bomb

On 14 February 2005, Hariri was killed when explosives equivalent to around 1,800 kilograms (4,000 lb) of TNT concealed inside a parked Mitsubishi van were detonated as his motorcade drove near the St. George Hotel in Beirut. 23 people, including Hariri himself, were killed. Among the dead were several of Hariri's bodyguards and his friend and former Minister of the Economy Bassel Fleihan. Hariri was buried along with his bodyguards, who died in the bombing, in a location near Mohammad Al-Amin Mosque.

A 2006 report by Serge Brammertz indicated that DNA evidence collected from the crime scene suggests that the assassination might be the act of a young male suicide bomber.

In its first two reports in 2014, the United Nations International Independent Investigation Commission indicated that the Syrian government may be linked to the assassination. Lawyers tasked with prosecuting those responsible for the 2005 bombing said they had received evidence linking Bashar al-Assad's phone to the case. In its tenth report, the UNIIIC concluded "that a network of individuals acted in concert to carry out the assassination of Rafic Hariri."

Hezbollah said Israel was responsible for the assassination. A Canadian Broadcasting Corporation news investigation stated that the special UN investigation team had found evidence for the responsibility of Unit 121 of Hezbollah in the assassination. A UN-backed tribunal issued four arrest warrants to members of Hezbollah. In August 2020, the Special Tribunal for Lebanon found Salim Ayyash, a mid-level operative in Hezbollah, guilty in absentia of five charges including the premeditated murder of Hariri using explosive materials. Three other defendants were acquitted. The panel of judges concluded there was "no evidence that the Hezbollah leadership had any involvement in Hariri's murder and there is no direct evidence of Syrian involvement." Hezbollah denied involvement and its leader, Hassan Nasrallah, refused to allow the arrest of Ayyash.

=== Funeral and memorial commemoration ===
Hariri was well regarded among international leaders. He was one of French president Jacques Chirac's closest friends. Chirac was one of the first foreign dignitaries to travel to Lebanon, where he personally offered his condolences to Hariri's widow, Nazik Hariri at her home in Beirut. He also attended the funeral, accompanied by his wife, Bernadette Chirac.

Among the foreign dignitaries attending the burial in Beirut were several European and Arab ministers, EU foreign policy chief Javier Solana, US assistant secretary of state William J. Burns, Saudi foreign minister Prince Saud bin Faisal Al Saud, and Arab League secretary-general Amr Moussa.

Approximately 200,000 people gathered in Martyr's Square to get a glimpse of the coffin draped in Lebanon's red, white, and green flag. Christians, Muslims, and Druze marched together in the procession, which concluded at the Mohammad Al-Amin Mosque, a structure Hariri had built in Beirut Central District. Church bells rang out, blending with the resounding calls to Islamic prayers and the beat of a military band's drums. The attendees turned the funeral of Hariri on February 16, 2005, into a powerful display of public anger against Syria, blamed by opposition leaders for the bomb that killed him, with some witnesses estimating that hundreds of thousands of mourners flooded the nearby streets in one of Lebanon's largest and most diverse gatherings in decades.

A month later, on March 14, 2005, to commemorate the one-month anniversary of his assassination, between 1.2 and 1.5 million people gathered in Martyr's Square for the memorial service, marking the largest public assembly in the country's history to date. People from all sects and regions of Lebanon, from Wadi Khaled in the north to Ain Ebel in the south, gathered to demand an end to Syria's occupation of Lebanon. About a month later, under increasing international pressure, Syria withdrew after a thirty-year-long occupation.

=== Aftermath ===
The Special Tribunal for Lebanon was also created at his instigation. Syria was initially accused of the assassination, which led to the withdrawal of Syrian troops from Lebanon following widespread protests.

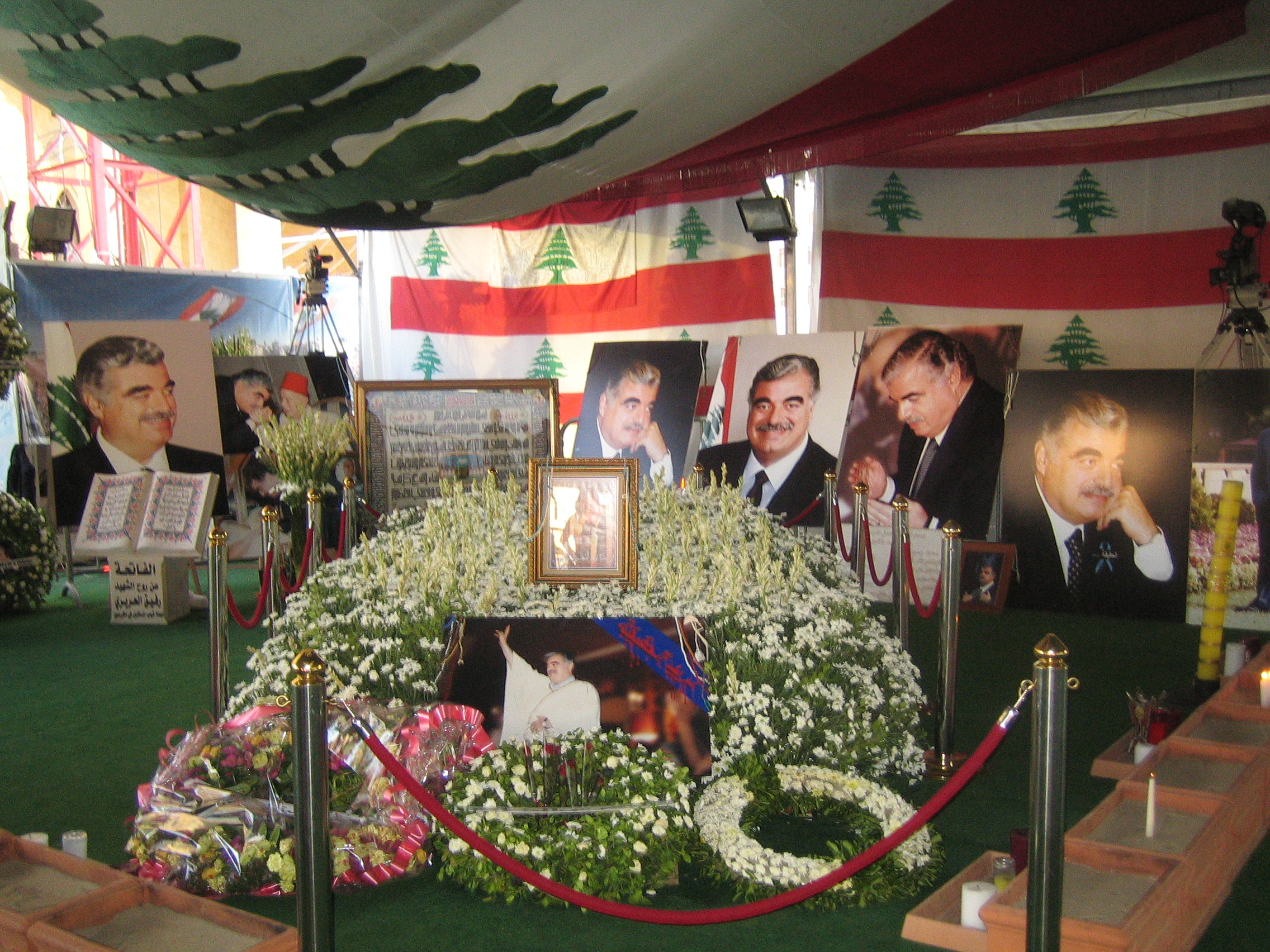
Memorial shrine dedicated to Hariri

Major General Jamil Al Sayyed, then head of Lebanese General Security, Brigadier General Mustafa Hamdan, Major General Ali Hajj and Brigadier General Raymond Azar were all arrested in August 2005 at the request of German prosecutor Detlev Mehlis, who was carrying out the UN investigation about the assassination. Sayyed was one of the persons who decided to assassinate Rafic Hariri according to a leaked draft version of the Mehlis report along with other Syrian high-rank intelligence and security officers and officials, namely Assef Shawkat, Maher Assad, Hassan Khalil and Bahjat Suleyman. However, later reports about the assassination did not repeat the allegations against Jamil Al Sayyed and other three Lebanese generals. Four Lebanese generals were held in Roumieh prison, northeast of Beirut from 2005 to 2009. They were released from the prison due to lack of evidence in 2009.

Following Hariri's death, there were several other bombings and assassinations against minor anti-Syrian figures. These included Samir Kassir, George Hawi, Gebran Tueni, Pierre Amine Gemayel, Antoine Ghanem and Walid Eido. Assassination attempts were made on Elias Murr, May Chidiac, and Samir Shehade (who was investigating Hariri's death).

An indictment against alleged Hezbollah members Salim Jamil Ayyash, Mustafa Amine Badreddine, Hussein Hassan Oneissi, and Assad Hassan Sabra was issued and confirmed by the Pre-Trial Judge of the United Nations special tribunal (see Special Tribunal for Lebanon) in 2011. In February 2014, the case against Hassan Habib Merhi was joined with the Ayyash et al. case. Proceedings against the accused Mustafa Badreddine were terminated in July 2016 following credible reports of his death. Salim Jamil Ayyash, Hassan Habib Merhi, Hussein Hassan Oneissi, and Assad Hassan Sabra currently remain on trial in absentia.

In 2009 the German news magazine Der Spiegel reported that some of the evidence supporting the indictment of Hezbollah involved a number of cellphones purchased in Tripoli shortly before the assassination, and were used by members of Hezbollah solely for the coordination of the assassination, except for a call from one of them to his girlfriend. The ties to Hezbollah were exposed by Captain Wissam Eid of the Lebanese Internal Security Force, who was assassinated himself before the conclusion of the investigation, as was Lebanese Brigadier General Wissam al-Hassan, one of the leading figures of the Special tribunal.

In August 2010, Hezbollah leader Hassan Nasrallah presented intercepted Israeli spy-drone video footage to CNN, which he said implicated Israel because "they were tracking Hariri's whereabouts and the roads that he took every day." When asked what Israel's motive would have been, Nasrallah said, "They just wanted to start an internal strife."

After an altercation between male tribunal staff and women at a gynecology clinic in October 2010, Hezbollah demanded that the Lebanese government stop all cooperation with the Special Tribunal investigation, claiming the tribunal to be an infringement on Lebanese sovereignty by Western governments.

On 1 November 2010, a report was leaked by Al Akhbar, a local secular, leftist newspaper, stating that Hezbollah drafted plans for a quick takeover of the country in the case an indictment against its members is issued by the UN Special Tribunal. The report states that Hezbollah conducted a simulation of the plan on 28 October, immediately following a speech by its secretary general.

On the other side, it was revealed by leaked US embassy cables that then Egyptian General Intelligence Directorate director Omar Suleiman reported that Syria "desperately" wanted to stop the investigation of the tribunal.

In 2024, Salim Jamil Ayyash, the assassin of Hariri, was reportedly killed by an IDF strike near al-Qusayr in the Homs region.

== Legacy ==
On 22 June 2005, Beirut International Airport was renamed Rafic Hariri International Airport. Additionally, Beirut General University hospital was renamed Rafiq Hariri Hospital. Rafic Hariri was succeeded by his son Saad Hariri as leader of the Future Party.

== See also ==
- List of assassinated Lebanese politicians
- Assassinations linked to the Cedar Revolution
- List of Lebanese people in Saudi Arabia
- Hariri Tribunal, officially called the Special Tribunal for Lebanon
- Unit 121
- Mohamed Khalouf

== Sources ==
- Sallam, Qasim (1980). Al-Baath wal Watan Al-Arabi [Arabic, with French translation] ("The Baath and the Arab Homeland"). Paris: EMA. ISBN 2-86584-003-4
- Stephan, Joseph S. (2006) Oeuvres et performances du president martyr Rafic Hariri, les performances economico-financieres avant Paris 2 et apres, le philanthrope batisseur
- Blandford, Nicholas (2006). Killing Mr Lebanon: The Assassination of Rafik Hariri and Its Impact on the Middle East
- Vloeberghs, Ward (2015). Architecture, Power and Religion in Lebanon: Rafiq Hariri and the Politics of Sacred Space in Beirut

Political offices
Preceded by Rachid Solh	Prime Minister of Lebanon; 1992–1998	Succeeded by Selim Hoss
Preceded by Selim Hoss	Prime Minister of Lebanon; 2000–2004	Succeeded by Omar Karami
