= Saudi Oger =

Saudi construction company (1978–2017)

Saudi Oger Limited شركة سعودي أوجيه المحدودة
- Type: Private
- Founded: 1978; 48 years ago
- Defunct: 31 July 2018
- Key people: Saad Hariri (Chairman); Ayman Hariri (CEO)
- Website: www.saudioger.com

Saudi Oger Ltd (Arabic: سعودي أوجيه), was a Saudi construction company, incorporated in January 1978 with its headquarters in Riyadh. The initial paid up capital of SR 1 million (US$267,000) was subsequently increased to the present level of SR 750 million (US$200 million). Saudi Oger was a private company, wholly owned by the Rafic Hariri family. After struggling for a long period, Saudi Oger closed down on 31 July 2017.

== Business lines ==
The Oger Telecommunications subsidiary provides fixed-line and mobile communication, and Internet services in Turkey, Saudi Arabia, Lebanon, Jordan, and South Africa. In 2008, Saudi Telecom Company (STC), acquired Oger Telecom for $2.56 billion with a 35% stake in the company.

== Criticism ==
Due to alleged mismanagement, corruption and falling oil prices, Saudi Oger suffered a significant financial impact, and failed to provide monthly salaries to its employees as of November 2015.

The French government appealed to the government of Saudi Arabia to assist 200 distressed French employees of Saudi Oger.

About 9,000 Filipino workers were appealing to both local officials and their country's embassy to help them resolve their escalating labor problem in terms of eight to nine months’ salary due, since November 2015.

The company had recently shut down the canteen for foreign workers. Some workers continue to rely on food donations from some community groups and embassy personnel.

The workers cannot leave their accommodations because their residence permits known as "Iqama" have expired. Only their employers can renew the expired permits. This would entail enormous costs given the immigration penalties involved per worker. If caught, they will be given prison sentences. The expiration of their "Iqama" also complicates other matters, such as closing of bank account and inability to call home because retail outlets look for these permits before selling SIM cards or mobile-phone credits. Their lack of mobility due to lack of a valid permit also prevents these workers from going to the nearest embassy or consulate to seek help.

Crime has risen inside the workers' accommodations and company premises. Company cars were overturned, housing units burned to the ground, and pickets have continued.

The reason why workers cannot leave the country is because they need to have a valid exit clearance to be able to leave, which only the management can provide. Most workers have already resigned from their jobs and filed for their exit clearances. However, the company could not provide airplane tickets, end of service benefits, and most importantly salaries which have resulted in their dire situation as stranded workers.
