= Ayman Hariri =

Lebanese billionaire businessman

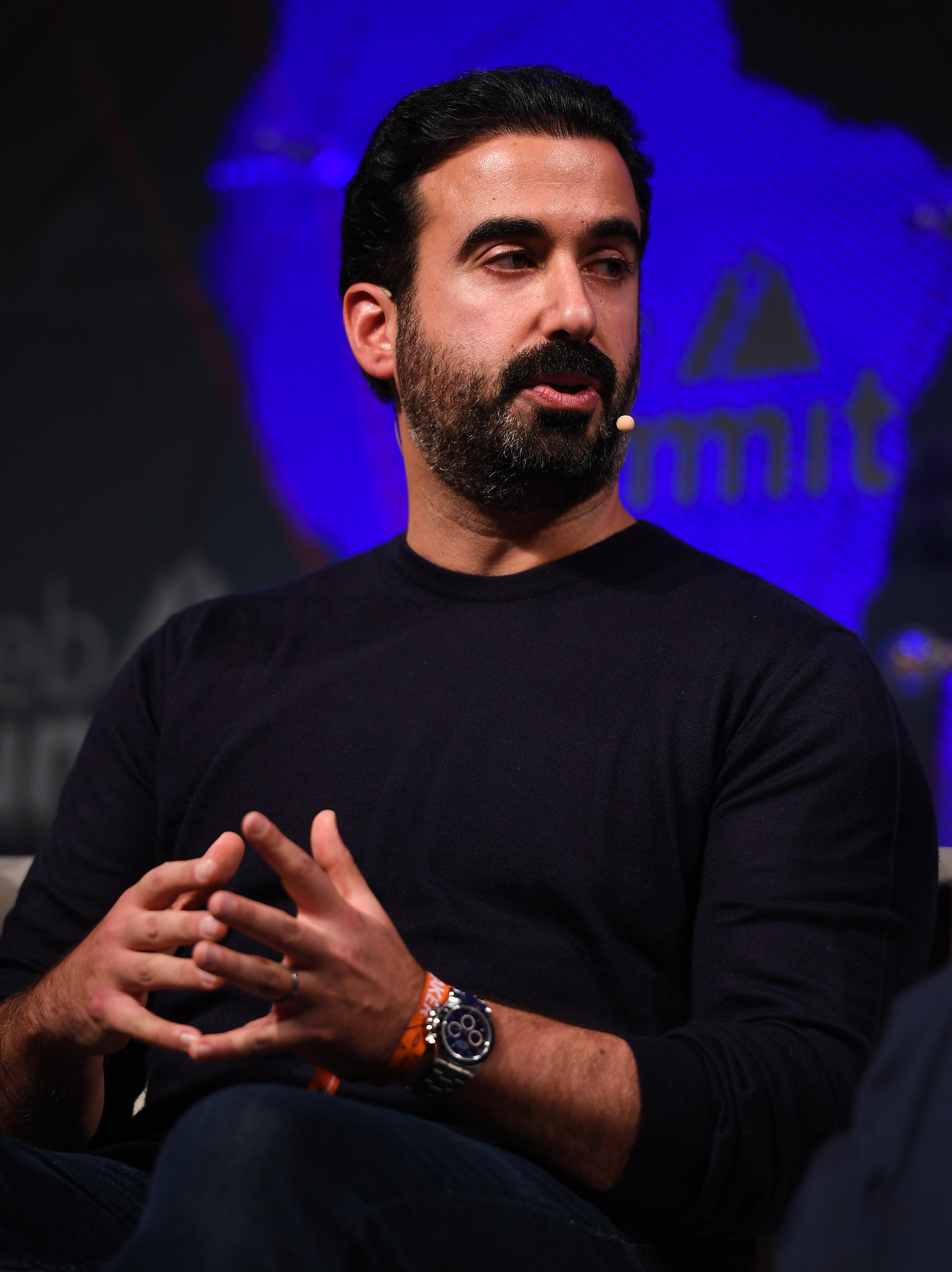
- Ayman Hariri, 2019
- Born: Ayman Rafic Hariri; 16 May 1978 (age 48); Saudi Arabia
- Education: Georgetown University
- Occupations: CEO and CPO of VERO
- Children: 3
- Parent(s): Rafic Hariri; Nazik Hariri
- Relatives: Fahd Hariri (brother); Hind Hariri (sister); Bahaa Hariri (half-brother); Saad Hariri (half-brother)

Ayman Rafic Hariri (Arabic: أيمن الحريري; born 16 May 1978) is a Lebanese billionaire businessman and technology entrepreneur, best known as the co-founder, CEO, and CPO of the social network Vero and former deputy CEO of Saudi Oger. He is the second-youngest son of Lebanese prime minister and tycoon Rafic Hariri.

== Early life ==
Ayman Hariri is the second-youngest son of Rafic Hariri. Born in Saudi Arabia, but at the age of two he moved to Lebanon, the birthplace of his father. Ayman moved to Paris at age 12 to attend school.

Following the path of his three half-brothers Bahaa, Saad and Houssam who were all college educated in the US, Hariri moved to the United States to study at Georgetown University and graduated in 1999 with a bachelor's degree in computer science.

His half-brother Houssam died in a car accident.

== Career ==
While at Georgetown University, he interned at Intelsat as a programmer. After graduating college, Hariri co-founded Epok with Scott Birnbaum in 2001. Epok was a distributed software platform designed to enable cross-network collaboration mostly designed for enterprises. The company primarily dealt with data privacy.

Following his father's assassination on 14 February 2005 in Beirut, Hariri returned to Saudi Arabia to support his family's business. He later became deputy CEO and deputy chairman of Saudi Oger, one of the largest construction companies based in Riyadh, Saudi Arabia. While at Saudi Oger, Hariri oversaw some of the biggest projects the company undertook including King Abdullah University for Science and Technology (KAUST), Princess Nourah Bint Abdul Rahman University in Riyadh and the Ritz Carlton in Riyadh and other major public projects.

Following his departure from Saudi Oger in 2013 and divestment in 2016, Hariri expanded his activities into private investment. Through Red Sea Ventures, he invested in technology companies, including early involvement in Nest. After a few years of development, Hariri launched the ad-free social network Vero in 2015, which is supported by a subscription model to generate revenue instead. In 2017, Hariri sold a 42.24% stake in GroupeMed Holding to OLT Holding, valued at approximately $535 million.

As of September 2026, Forbes estimated his net worth at US$1.4 billion.

== Controversy ==
=== Saudi Oger ===
In late February 2018, Hariri's social media company, Vero, saw a marked increase in users and scrutiny. This scrutiny focused especially on Saudi Oger's inability to pay its migrant workers during 2016. According to a statement to USA Today and Gizmodo from Vero, he ceased duties as deputy CEO and deputy chairman of his family's construction company in 2013. However, Gizmodo found references to his still being in those positions as late as February 2016, after the company's founding, including in one of Vero's press releases.

=== Russia ===
In February 2018, a Twitter user criticized VERO for employing Russian developers in its team and questioned whether the app could be trusted on that basis. In a statement to Time, a Vero spokesman confirmed that the company does, "like almost every global technology company" use developers from across the world including the US, Russia, UK, Europe and Africa and dismissed the claim as baseless.

== Personal life ==
Hariri is married and has three children He formerly lived in Paris, France. Today Hariri and his wife and children live in Dubai. Hariri has a collection of rare comic books, named The Impossible Collection which he exhibited in London in 2016 at the premiere of Batman v Superman: Dawn of Justice.
