= Nazik Hariri =

Rafic Hariri's wife

- نازك حريري
- Born: Nazik Audi
- Spouse: Rafic Hariri (m. 1976; died 2005)
- Children: 6, including Ayman, Fahd, Hind

Nazik Hariri (née Audi; Arabic: نازك حريري) is the widow of former Prime Minister of Lebanon Rafic Hariri. She married him in 1976. Nazik is of Palestinian origin.

She married twice. She has three children from her second spouse, Rafic Hariri, including Ayman, Fahd and Hind. Her daughter from her first marriage, Joumana, is married to the businessman Nizar Dalloul who is the son of the Shia politician Mohsen Dalloul.
