= 2012–2017 Lebanon–Syria border clashes =

Series of clashes on the Lebanon–Syria border

Lebanese–Syrian border clashes
- Part of the Syrian civil war spillover in Lebanon
Date	1 June 2012 – 28 August 2017 (5 years, 2 months, 3 weeks and 6 days)
Location	Lebanon–Syria border
Result	Lebanese/Syrian government victory
Territorial changes	Lebanese and Syrian governments fully recapture the Lebanon–Syria border

Belligerents
Free Syrian Army (surrendered); Saraya Ahl al-Sham (surrendered); Al-Nusra Front^{[a]}; Islamic State (2013–17); 313 Brigade (Syria); Jaysh al-Islam; Ahrar al-Sham; Al-Qaeda and allies: Hay'at Tahrir al-Sham (2017) (surrendered); Fatah al-Islam (until 2014); Ghuraba al-Sham (until 2013); Jund al-Sham (until 2014); Abdullah Azzam Brigades; Osbat al-Ansar; Osbat al-Nour; Sunni Resistance Committees	Lebanon; Lebanese Armed Forces; Internal Security Forces; Syria; Syrian Armed Forces

Commanders and leaders
	(Lebanon) Michel Sleiman (2012–14) (Lebanon) Tammam Salam (2014–16) (Lebanon) Jean Kahwaji (2012–17)
- ^{a} The al-Nusra Front closely cooperated with ISIL between 2013 and 2014, were considered "frenemies" in 2015, and became embroiled in open conflict with it in 2017.

The Lebanese–Syrian border clashes were a series of clashes on the Lebanon–Syria border caused by the Syrian Civil War.

== Timeline ==
=== 2012 ===
At the beginning of the summer 2012, two Hezbollah fighters were killed in a clash with Syrian rebels who were on Lebanese territory.

On 17 September, Syrian Ground-attack aircraft fired three missiles 500 metres (1,600 ft) over the border into Lebanese territory near Arsal. It was suggested that the jets were chasing rebels in the vicinity. The attack prompted Lebanese president Michel Sleiman to launch an investigation, whilst not publicly blaming Syria for the incident.

On 22 September, a group of armed members of the Free Syrian Army attacked a border post near Arsal. This was reported to be the second incursion within a week. The group were chased off into the hills by the Lebanese Army, who detained and later released some rebels due to pressure from dignified locals. Michel Sleiman praised the actions taken by the military as maintaining Lebanon's position being "neutral from the conflicts of others". He called on border residents to "stand beside their army and assist its members." Syria has repeatedly called for an intensified crackdown on rebels that it claims are hiding in Lebanese border towns.

On 11 October 2012, four shells fired by the Syrian military hit Masharih al-Qaa, where previous shelling incidents have caused fatalities. Lebanon's position of ignoring the attacks and dissociating itself from the conflict remained unchanged.

On 30 November 2012, between 14 and 20 Islamists from North Lebanon, as well a Palestinian, were killed in an ambush in Tall Kalakh near the Lebanese border. They had gone to Syria to fight alongside the Syrian rebels.

=== 2013 ===
On 1 February 2013, two Lebanese soldiers were killed, along with 1-2 militants, and six were wounded in clashes near the Syrian border which started after an attempt by the military to arrest an anti-Assad rebel commander, who was also killed.

Three Lebanese soldiers were killed in an attack on their checkpoint near the border town of Arsal by unknown militants who than fled over the border into Syria.

In the night of 2 June 2013, heavy clashes between Syrian rebels and Hezbollah took place near the Lebanese town of Ain el-Jaouze, which is close to the border area between Lebanon and Syria. The rebels were either members of the radical Al-Nusra Front or of the Free Syrian Army. Hezbollah fighters attacked a rebel rocket team which was reportedly preparing to fire rockets into Shi'ite areas of the Lebanese Beqaa Valley. 14–17 rebels and one Hezbollah fighter were killed. The rebels said the attack was in retaliation for Hezbollah's support for the Syrian Army at the battle of al-Qusayr. On 6 June 2013, unknown gunmen attacked a Lebanese Army checkpoint in Arsal, near the border. In the ensuing gunfight two of the gunmen were killed. The Army captured a pick-up truck that contained weapons and ammunition. After examining the bodies, it was determined that at least one of the dead gunmen was a Syrian national. The nationality of the other dead man was not stated.

On 28 June 2013, a double roadside bomb detonated in Zahlé, Beqaa Governorate, the blasts targeted a Hezbollah convoy in Zahle on this day. There were no reported casualties and minimal damages resulting from the attack. The 313 Brigade claimed responsibility for the attack. Weeks later, in July 9th, an explosives-laden vehicle detonated at a supermarket parking lot in Dahiyeh, Haret Hreik, Beirut. The attack left 53 people wounded, and its claimed by the 313 Brigade claimed, stating the Hezbollah-controlled area was targeted for their support of Bashar al Assad in the Syrian Civil War.

=== 2014 ===
On June 14, 2014, the Syrian Army and Hezbollah fighters bombed the village of Tfeil in the Bekka valley causing much damage to people and property.

On 14 July, Hezbollah fighters launched an attack on Syrian rebels holding out on the border with Lebanon between Qalamoun and Arsal, killing three rebels and wounding ten. The clashes left one fighter from Hezbollah dead and twelve others wounded. The fighting moved into Lebanon outside the town of Nahleh, with fighting killing an additional seven Hezbollah fighters and 32 rebels.

On 16 July, Al Nusra Front ambushed Hezbollah fighters attempting to enter Al Qalamoun from Lebanon, leaving three of them dead. By this time, it was estimated that 26 Al Nusra Front fighters had been killed.

On 17 July, fierce clashes broke out between Hezbollah fighters and Al Nusra Front fighters on the outskirts of the Lebanese town of Arsal and Al-Fakiha. Hezbollah reportedly captured seven Al Nusra Front fighters. The fighting continued into the next day, with Syrian jets and Hezbollah bombarding rebel positions stretching from Arsal to Nanleh. Arsal residents were apparently being coerced into allowing fighters to rest there, and many civilians from Lebanese border villages had been kidnapped.

On 2 August, Al Nusra Front leader Emad Jumaa was detained by Lebanese authorities at a checkpoint near Arsal. Al Nusra Front fighters, still reeling from an ambush orchestrated by pro-Syrian forces across the border, promptly surrounded Lebanese army checkpoints around the town and demanded his release. The army refused, and Al Nusra Front, backed by fighters from the Islamic State, stormed Arsal and captured the police station. Clashes broke out in and around the town between the militants and the Lebanese army, leaving 11 militants and 7 soldiers dead. The Lebanese army began to shell the town throughout the night, as Al Nusra Front detained 16 members of the local security forces.

From the second to the fifth fierce battles raged, lasting until the Jihadi army withdrew back into Syria on the fifth, capturing dozens of hostages, which were later used as bargaining chips. Desperate battles between Al Nusra Front and Hezbollah fighters took place on the Syrian side of the border, spilling over into the Arsal area again on 21 August.

On August 26, Syrian bombers targeted suspected rebel outposts on the Lebanese side of the border, beginning an offensive that inadvertently involved Lebanese troops, threatening to turn the Bekka valley into major battlefield of a regional war.

On 16 September, Al-Nusra Front fighters crossed into Lebanon after clashing with the Syrian army. The Lebanese army repelled them, killing and wounding an unverified number.

On 19 September, two Lebanese soldiers were killed and three were wounded when a bomb exploded as their convoy was headed towards the outskirts of Arsal.

On 2 December, six Lebanese soldiers were killed and one wounded in an ambush by unknown gunmen in the Tal Hamra area of Ras Baalbek, near the border with Syria.

=== 2015 ===
On 23 January, eight soldiers were killed and 22 wounded near Ras Baalbek after their outpost near the border was attacked by Al Nusra. The fighting also left more than 40 militants dead.

== See also ==
- Lebanese Civil War
- Lebanon–Syria border clashes (March 2025–present)
