= Syrian civil war spillover in Lebanon =

2014–2017 military conflict in Lebanon, during the Syrian Civil War

- Part of the Arab Winter, the Spillover of the Syrian civil war, the Iran–Saudi Arabia proxy war, and the War against the Islamic State
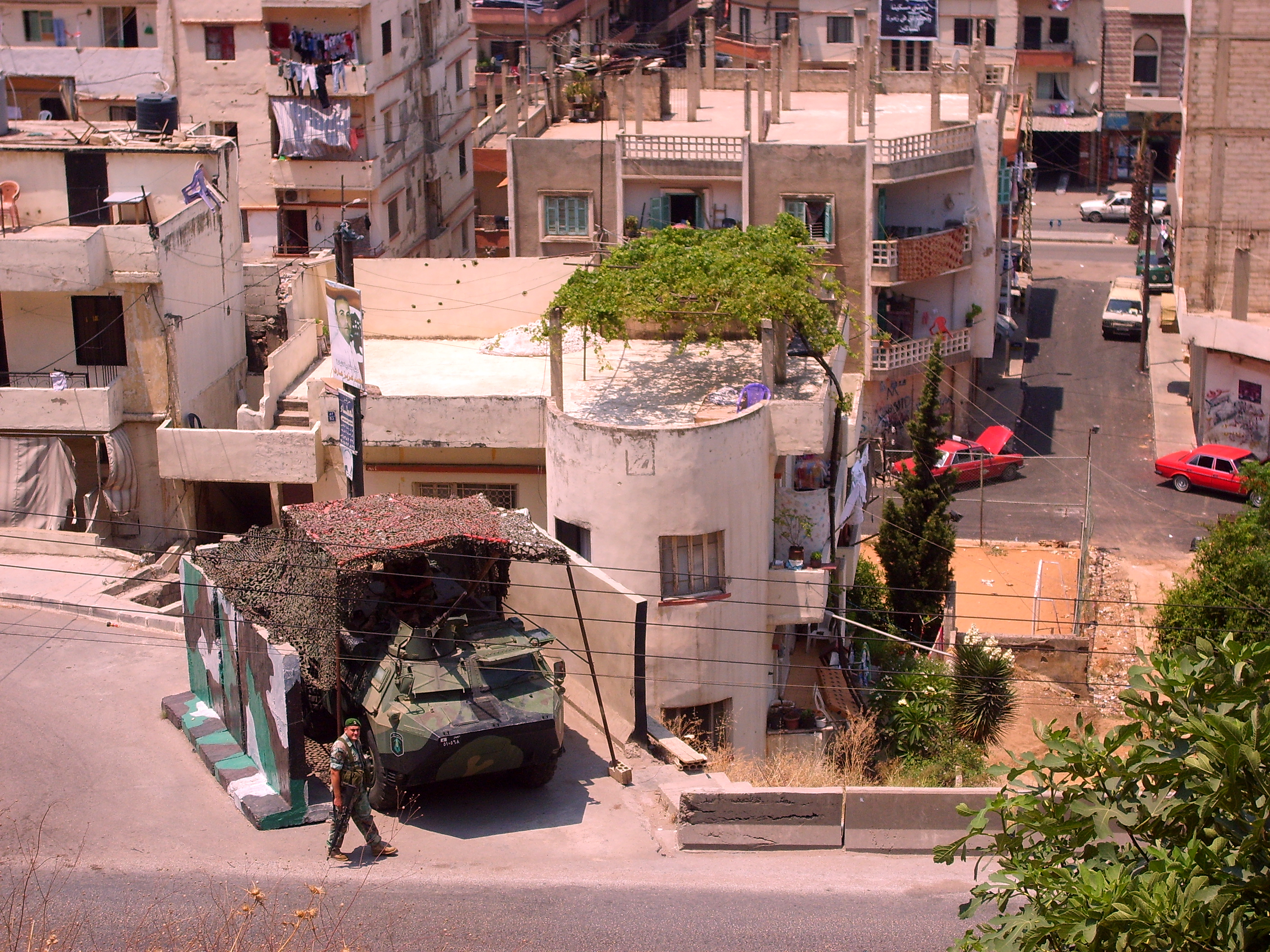
- Lebanese army's 4th Intervention Regiment personnel on Syria Street, guarding the road between Bab al-Tabbaneh and Jabal Mohsen in 2011
Date	17 June 2011 – 28 August 2017 (6 years, 2 months, 1 week and 4 days)
Location	Lebanon (Akkar, Arsal, Beirut, Qaa, Ras Baalbek, Sidon, and Tripoli)
Result	Lebanese victory
Territorial changes	Lebanese Army and Hezbollah expelled IS militants as well as fighters of Al-Qaeda and its allies from Lebanon entirely in 2017 and reestablished control across all of Lebanese territory.

Main belligerents
Lebanon; Lebanese Armed Forces; Internal Security Forces; Support: Australia; Canada; China; Cyprus; Czech Republic; Egypt; France; Germany; Iran; Italy; Jordan; Syria; Netherlands; Russia; Saudi Arabia; South Korea; Spain; Turkey; United Kingdom; United States; Hezbollah; Lebanese Resistance Brigades; PFLP-GC; Amal Movement; Syrian Social Nationalist Party; DFLP; Popular Nasserist Organization; As-Sa'iqa; Fatah al-Intifada; Arab Democratic Party (until 2014); Armenian Revolutionary Federation; Arab Movement Party; Lebanese Communist Party; Fatah; Support: Syria; Iran; Russia	Free Syrian Army; Saraya Ahl al-Sham (surrendered); Brigades of Aisha; Islamic Front (until 2015); Jaysh al-Islam; Al-Nusra Front (until 2017)^{[a]}; Hay'at Tahrir al-Sham (from 2017) (surrendered); Support: Saudi Arabia; Fatah al-Islam; Ghuraba al-Sham (until 2013); Jund al-Sham; Abdullah Azzam Brigades; Osbat al-Ansar; Sunni Resistance Committees; Muslim Youth; Islamic State (surrendered) (from 2013); Military of ISIL; Free Sunnis of Baalbek Brigade

Commanders and leaders
Michel Aoun (2016–2017); Saad Hariri (2016–2017); Roger Salem (2011–2017); Joseph Aoun (2017); Michel Suleiman (2011–2014); Najib Mikati (2011–2014); Jean Kahwaji (2011–2017); Tammam Salam (2014–2016); Ashraf Rifi (2014–2016); (Hezbollah) Hassan Nasrallah; (Hezbollah) Hassan al-Laqqis X; Assaad Hardan; Rifa'at Eid; Fuad Othman; Osama Saad; Shaker Berjawi; Khaled Hadadi; Fathi Zeidan †; Talal al-Ourdouni †	Abdullah Hussein al-Rifai †; Abu Firas al-Jibba †; Jamal Husayn Zayniyah (Al-Nusra Front operations commander in the Qalamoun): Abu Malek al-Tali (surrendered); Ahmed Al-Assir; Abu Tarek al-Saadi; Islam al-Shahal; Bilal Badr; Majed al-Majed †; Ziad Alloukeh (POW); Naim Abbas (POW); Ahmad Mohammad Ammoun (POW); Abu Fouz †; Imad Yassin (POW); Ahmad Youssef Ammoun (POW)

Strength
12,000 soldiers mobilized	1,500–4,000+ fighters 7,000 fighters

Casualties and losses
61 soldiers killed (See here.)	In clashes with Lebanese Army: 800+ killed 2000+ captured (Lebanese Army claim); In clashes with Hezbollah: Unknown
- ~350 civilians killed
- ^{a} The al-Nusra Front closely cooperated with ISIL between 2013 and 2014, were considered "frenemies" in 2015, and became embroiled in open conflict with it in 2017.

Between 2011 and 2017, fighting from the Syrian civil war spilled over into Lebanon as opponents and supporters of the Ba'athist Syrian regime traveled to Lebanon to fight and attack each other on Lebanese soil. The Syrian conflict stoked a resurgence of sectarian violence in Lebanon, with many of Lebanon's Sunni Muslims and Lebanon's Christians supporting the rebels in Syria, while many of Lebanon's Shi'a Muslims supporting the Ba'athist government of Bashar al-Assad, whose Alawite minority is usually described as a heterodox offshoot of Shi'ism. Killings, unrest and sectarian kidnappings across Lebanon resulted.

The conflict arose in mid-2011, when seven people were killed and 59 wounded in a fight between gunmen in Tripoli. In May 2012, the conflict spread to Beirut, and later to south and east Lebanon, while the Lebanese Armed Forces deployed in north Lebanon and Beirut. As of January 2016, there had been more than 800 fatalities and almost 3,000 injuries. Among Lebanon's political blocs, the Saudi-backed anti-Syrian March 14 Alliance supports the Syrian opposition, and the Iranian-backed pro-Syrian March 8 Alliance supports the Assad government. On 28 August 2017, the last remaining fighters of IS and Hay'at Tahrir al-Sham withdrew from Lebanon.

== Background ==
Since the Cedar Revolution in 2005 and the withdrawal of the occupying Syrian forces from the country, the Lebanese political spectrum has been divided between the anti-Syrian government 14 March alliance and the pro-Syrian government 8 March alliance. The 14 March alliance, led by the mainly Sunni Muslim Future Movement, which is allied with the Maronite Christian Lebanese Forces Party, has called for Lebanese aid to the Free Syrian Army and taking a stronger stance against the Syrian government.

This has been rejected by the ruling 8 March alliance, which includes the Shia Hezbollah and allies such as the Maronite Free Patriotic Movement, among others. In August, The Jerusalem Post reported that protesters, enraged at Hezbollah's support for Syria's government, burned Hezbollah flags and images of its leader Hassan Nasrallah in several places in Syria. Pro-government protestors countered the actions by carrying posters of Nasrallah. Hezbollah states they support a process of reforms in Syria and that they are also against U.S. plots to destabilize and interfere in Syria, amid comments by U.S. Secretary of State Hillary Clinton that it should be "abundantly clear to those who support Assad [the] 'regime' [that] its days are numbered." It was reported that, "sales of black market weapons in Lebanon have skyrocketed in recent weeks due to demand in Syria." In June 2011, clashes in the Lebanese city of Tripoli between members of the Alawite minority, loyal to Syrian President Bashar al-Assad, and members of the Sunni majority left seven people dead.

Future Movement MP Okab Sakr was long suspected to be involved in aiding the insurgents in the Syrian civil war. At first he denied his involvement, but admitted it when Al Akhbar published audio tapes of him making arms deals with Syrian insurgents. Sakr later claimed the tapes were edited, and that he only provided Syrians with milk and blankets.

Sunni extremists from Tripoli have been flocking to Syria to join Jabhat al-Nusra. Hezbollah fighters have been deployed to protect border towns inhabited by Lebanese Shias from the rebels.

The Lebanese Army has attempted to disassociate itself from the conflict in Syria, and to prevent clashes within Lebanon.

== Timeline ==
=== Border incidents and clashes (2011–2014) ===
From the inception of the violence that began in Syria as a result of the Arab Spring, the Syrian civil war has produced and inspired a great deal of strife and unrest among armed factions. Prior to the Battle of Arsal in August 2014, the Lebanese Army has tried to keep out of it and the violence has been mostly between various factions within the country and overt Syrian involvement has been limited to airstrikes and occasional accidental incursions.

=== Major battles (2014–2015) ===
In June 2014, a joint brigade of Al-Nusra Front and ISIL militants invaded and briefly held the town of Arsal. On 2 August 2014, Al-Nusra militants raided Lebanese checkpoints and captured parts of northeastern Arsal, prompting the Lebanese Army to launch a counter-attack with Syrian air support. The Lebanese Army recaptured all of Arsal after five days of fighting with Al-Nusra and ISIL militants.

A year later, in June 2015, Hezbollah leader Hassan Nasrallah claimed that Al-Nusra and ISIL had seized territory within Lebanon and that major fighting was going on between them and Hezbollah, as well as with each other.

In September 2015, a senior commander of the Al-Nusra Front and eight other militants were killed in a joint-operation between the Lebanese Army and Hezbollah.

=== Recapture of Lebanese territory (2017) ===
By 22 June 2016, 95% of the territory once controlled by militants had been recaptured by the Lebanese Army and its allies, with only 50 km^{2} left under militant control. Daily clashes were ongoing mainly near the town of Arsal. On 22 September, ISIL emir Imad Yassin was arrested at the Ain al-Hilweh refugee camp and sentenced to 160 years in prison. Clashes erupted between ISIL and Nusra Front in Arsal Barrens on 26 October after ISIL tried to infiltrate towards the Hamid valley. On 28 October, the Lebanese Army carried out a raid against ISIL in the Wadi Zarzour area of Jaroud 'Arsal, killing a number of militants and destroying a militant hideout. ISIL commander Ahmad Youssef Amoun was arrested along with 10 other militants on 24 November after a military operation by the Lebanese Army on a temporary headquarter of the group near Arsal.

In February 2017, negotiations between Hezbollah and Saraya Ahl al-Sham began in order to install a ceasefire in the Syria–Lebanon border and for residents to return to the contest towns and villages between Hezbollah and the rebels.

On 21 July 2017, a Syrian Army commander stated that his forces and Hezbollah had launched a joint campaign to recapture the remaining territory under militant control near the Lebanon-Syria border, attacking the outskirts of Arsal. The Lebanese Army meanwhile assumed a defensive position in Arsal.

On 22 July 2017, Hezbollah officials claimed to have recaptured key points near the border, including the strategic hilltop of Dhahr al-Huwa, a former Tahrir al-Sham (al-Nusra) base.

On 27 July 2017, a three-day ceasefire agreement was reached by Hezbollah with Tahrir al-Sham and Saraya Ahl al-Sham in the Lebanese portion of the Qalamoun Mountains. The agreement called for Tahrir al-Sham forces to withdraw from Lebanon to Idlib, Saraya Ahl al-Sham forces to withdraw to the eastern Qalamoun Mountains, and exchanges of prisoners from both sides.

On 27 August 2017, the remaining ISIL holdouts in the western Qalamoun agreed to the ceasefire with the Lebanese Army in Lebanon and Hezbollah and the Syrian Army on the Syrian side of the border. The next day, ISIL fighters burned its headquarters in the area, and prepared to be transferred to Abu Kamal. With the ISIL withdrawal, the Lebanese government regained full control of Lebanese territory for the first time in six years.

=== Aftermath ===
ISIL militants killed three municipal guards in the town of Kaftoun-Koura in August 2020.

In retaliation for an earlier operation by the Lebanese Army, ISIL militants killed two Lebanese soldiers in their barracks on 27 September 2020.

In the years following the end of the civil war both countries are struggling to rebuild. Patricia Karam's research suggests that Lebanon's sources of labor are a key to helping rebuild both countries in the aftermath of the civil war. As the author states the economic loss from the civil war totals an estimated 923 billion USD. Syria and Lebanon's economies are interdependent and have been for decades. During the Assad regime Lebanon was Syria's backbone when it came to bypassing the sanctions that other countries imposed upon Syria for the acts the Assad regime was committing. In return, Syria provides a large amount of manpower to Lebanon's workforce. However, Lebanon experienced a major financial collapse in 2019 which put a strain on the economic roundabouts that Syria was using to bypass sanctions. In March 2025 the European Union granted a large fund to Lebanon and Syria to help with reconstruction. This will keep their economies linked together for the foreseeable future as they need each other to rebuild.

=== Lebanon's rebuilding efforts ===
Lebanon has partnered with the United Nation Development Program (UNDP) to open up temporary jobs for citizens displaced by the civil war. The goal is to speed up the rebuilding efforts which is helping open up store fronts and markets which, according to the UNDP, is one of the backbones of the Lebanese economy. The UNDP has made claims to be aiding in the rebuilding of essential infrastructure in Lebanon which includes sending money into the country to fund community led projects as well as physical infrastructure like building roads, clinics, and restoring power grids. Syrian Refugees are a part of this UNDP work for cash initiative. In 2013 it was reported that Lebanon was housing around 230,000 Syrian Refugees. This, in spite of these refugees being displaced, continues the economic relationship between Syria and Lebanon as Syrian refugees are helping to rebuild Lebanon. These refugees were able to be housed due to Lebanon's appeal to receive funds from the UN. These funds, totaling around 180 million USD per year, are used for humanitarian resources for the refugees, who as stated, are helping with Lebanon's rebuilding efforts.

=== Lebanon's post-war future ===
Lebanon's currency has continued to depreciate over time due to its lack of reforms and corruption in the upper class. The International Monetary Fund (IMF) has agreed to help Lebanon but only if Lebanon agrees and enacts major reforms in its economic foundations. This is working to eliminate debt, strengthen the currency (which, given an Aleppo study, has lost 90% of its value in the post civil war time), and reinforce the central bank. After these reforms the IMF has agreed to step in with financial assistance given that negotiations have been delayed until reforms have finished. The future of Lebanon's rebuilding is very murky. The ongoing economic crisis is a massive hindrance to the rebuilding efforts as well as consistent attacks from Israel for Lebanon's assistance to Palestine in the Israel and Palestinian conflict.

== Deaths and injuries ==
In the unrest of June 2011, at least 7 deaths were reported. A further two or three deaths occurred during the incidents of February 2012.

Between May 2012 and December 2015, violent political incidents had resulted in at least 789 fatalities and more than 2,700 injuries, mostly during the Bab al Tabbaneh–Jabal Mohsen clashes in Tripoli. In August 2014, starting with the battle of Arsal between the Lebanese Army and Sunni militants at the beginning of the month and intense fighting that included both the Syrian and Lebanese armies in and near Arsal and the Bekaa Valley at the end of the month, the fighting had reached a new and different phase. The August casualties nearly equaled half the number of the previous two years put together. 12 November 2015, bombings in Beirut killed 43 people in the deadliest event of 2015 for this conflict.

The Lebanese Army stated that by June 2016, about 500 ISIL and Nusra militants had been killed and 700 captured in the border area of Lebanon and Syria.

In December 2020, hundreds of Syrian refugees fled a makeshift camp in Miniyeh–Danniyeh District, North Governorate, Lebanon, after local youths had stormed their camp and torched tents, wounding three people, according to the United Nations High Commissioner for Refugees.

== Reactions ==
=== Domestic political reactions ===
22 May 2012, Hezbollah deputy leader Sheikh Naim Qassem condoled Sunni Grand Mufti Mohammed Rashid Qabbani over the killings, and relayed the condolences of Hassan Nasrallah. The same day, Shadi Mawlawi, the Islamist whose arrest sparked the clashes in Tripoli, was released from custody, but Islamist protesters did not stop their sit-in protests, since they wanted 123 other Islamists freed as well. The Future Movement called for Mikati to immediately resign, claiming his cabinet had shown incapability to maintain the country's security. Lebanese Forces leader Samir Geagea accused Hezbollah of training and arming groups in Tripoli.

In August 2012, Prime Minister Najib Miqati, a native of Tripoli, issued a statement saying that "efforts to drag Lebanon more and more into the conflict in Syria when what is required is for leaders to cooperate...to protect Lebanon from the danger" and urged the international community to help prevent Lebanon from being another theater in the Syrian civil war. He added: "The cabinet work is not a priority compared to what the country is witnessing when it comes to exposure to the Syrian crisis and attempts to transfer it to Lebanon. The country is in great danger."

An Nahar cited unnamed "western diplomatic sources" as stating that these incidents were the beginning of a Salafi revolution aimed at arming the uprising in Syria. Salafists in Lebanon have often voiced their support for the uprising in Syria. The 14 March alliance also accused the Syrian government of trying to drag Lebanon into its crisis. The Future Movement's former MP Mustafa Alloush said after regular weekly meeting: "It is actually an attempt to make of Tripoli a zone of terrorism. It also aims at striking Lebanon's northern area which has welcomed and helped out the Syrian displaced." Calls by Rifaat Eid, the head of the Arab Democratic Party, for a return of the Syrian army to Tripoli to impose security in the city were rejected by Prime Minister Najib Mikati.

The Syrian civil war and its domestic impact have furthered the polarisation of Lebanese politics. The March 14 Alliance, dominated by Christian- and Sunni-based parties, is broadly sympathetic to the Syrian opposition to Bashar al-Assad. In August, youth members of 14 March parties including Kataeb, Lebanese Forces, National Liberal Party, Future Movement and Islamic Group held a rally to demand the expulsion of the Syrian Ambassador. 8 March parties generally supported the continuation of the Assad government, but analysts believe some groups within the coalition may seek new alliances if the Assad government falls. More moderate members of the coalition in government have begun distancing themselves from the Assad government.

Previously allied with Assad, the Progressive Socialist Party of Walid Jumblatt have taken an anti-Assad stance.

As of 13 February 2013, more than 182,938 Syrian refugees are in Lebanon. As the number of Syrian refugees increases, the Lebanese Forces Party, the Kataeb Party, and the Free Patriotic Movement fear the country's sectarian based political system is being undermined. Other parties, such as the mostly Shia Lebanese Option Gathering and the mostly Sunni Najjadeh Party have also taken stances close to 14 March, including calling cancellation of agreements between the two countries.

=== International ===
- UN: On 21 May 2012, Secretary-General Ban Ki-moon appealed for calm after the clashes. On 22 August 2012, Under-Secretary-General for Political Affairs Jeffrey Feltman, in a meeting of the Security Council, described the situation as "precarious" and warned that a deteriorating situation in Syria could destabilise Lebanon.
- Russia: On 23 May 2012, Foreign Minister Sergei Lavrov said there was a real threat of conflict spilling over from Syria and that it could have a very bad ending.
- Saudi Arabia: On 23 May 2012, King Abdullah wrote to Lebanese President Michel Suleiman expressing concern over the recent violence in Tripoli, especially the sectarian nature of the violence.
- United States: On 25 May 2012, Secretary of State Hillary Clinton called for restraint and said the U.S. was concerned the unrest in Syria would contribute instability in Lebanon. In May, Ambassador Maura Connelly met with Lebanese Prime Minister Najib Mikati to express her concern with the security situation in Tripoli and commended the government's efforts to defuse the situation.

=== Other ===
Bilal Saab, a senior fellow at the Middle East Institute, argued that Lebanon's handling of the Syrian crisis was a good sign for the domestic stability of the country and U.S. policies. He noted that while the 2007 Lebanon conflict saw a mere 450 gunmen in one refugee camp kill or wound several hundred Lebanese security forces and force the government to reduce the camp to rubble to flush them out, the Syrian war spillover was dealt with much more cleanly and efficiently, with the Lebanese Army swiftly defeating and evicting a force of several thousand Islamic State militants. In addition to noting the large improvements in troop and equipment quality over the preceding decade (partly thanks to American funding), Saab also noted that the battles solidified the legitimacy of the Lebanese Army as a defender of the country, earning it positive publicity among the country's northern regions and detracting from the influence of Hezbollah.

== Gallery ==
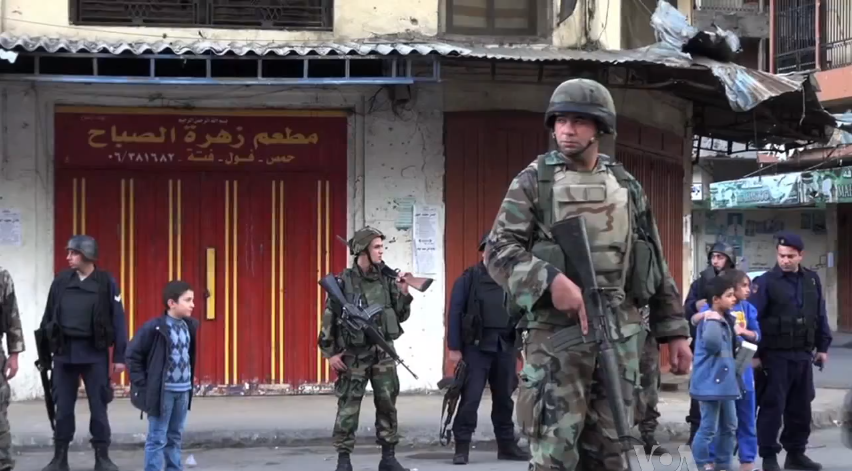
The Lebanese army in Tripoli after sectarian clashes, in 2012.

2012 VOA report about the context of the conflict

2012 VOA report on the US reaction to the conflict

== See also ==
- Bab al-Tabbaneh–Jabal Mohsen conflict
- Lebanon–Syria border
- Syrians in Lebanon
