= Mohammed Shreidi =

Mohammed Shreidi (c. 1986 – February 11, 2004) was the youngest son of Sheik Hisham Shreidi founder of Osbat al-Ansar. After the killings of his father in 1991 and his older brother, Abdullah Shreidi in 2003 by the al-Fatah militia in Ain al-Hilweh. Shreidi attempted to lead Asbat al-Nour when he was 18 years old. On February 11, 2004 Mohhamed Shreidi was killed by al-Fatah gunmen.
