= Imad Yassin =

Palestinian leader and commander

Imad Yassin is a Palestinian leader of Jund Ash Sham's military wing. He is a dropout of Abu Mohjen's Osbat al-Ansar, which has long been considered a terrorist organization by the United States, due to its connection with Osama bin Laden's al-Qaida network.

He plegded his allegiance to the Islamic State of Iraq and the Levant in 2013 and later became emir of Ain al-Hilweh refugee camp as part of the Islamic State of Iraq and the Levant

== Capture ==
Yassin was arrested by Lebanese Security forces on 22 September 2016 in the Ain al-Hilweh refugee camp, and sentenced to 160 years in a Lebanese military court for shooting at Lebanese soldiers as well as transporting weapons and munitions for militant groups.
