= List of armed groups in the Syrian civil war spillover in Lebanon =

A number of armed groups have involved themselves in the Syrian Civil War spillover in Lebanon.

== Syrian Civil War spillover in Lebanon (17 June 2011 – 28 August 2017) ==
Lebanese Government	Syrian opposition and allies	(Syria) Syrian Government and allies	Islamic State of Iraq and the Levant
Lebanese government: Lebanese Army; 5th Heavy Infantry Mechanized Brigade; 7th Light Infantry Brigade; 1st Artillery Regiment; Internal Security Forces; Lebanese Air Force; Supported by: Australia; Canada; China; Cyprus; Czech Republic; Egypt; France; Germany; Iran; Italy; Jordan; Netherlands; Russia; Saudi Arabia; South Korea; Spain; Turkey; United Kingdom; United States; United States special operations forces	(Syrian opposition) (Lebanon) Anti-Syrian government militias: Free Syrian Army; Saraya Ahl al-Sham (surrendered); 313th Special Forces Brigade; Islamic Front (until 2015); Jaysh al-Islam; Future Movement; Joint operations rooms: Army of Conquest (2015-2017); Al-Qaeda affiliates: Tahrir al-Sham (surrendered) (January–August 2017); Al-Nusra Front^{[a]}; Fatah al-Islam (until 2014); Ghuraba al-Sham (until 2013); Jund al-Sham (until 2014); Abdullah Azzam Brigades; Osbat al-Ansar; Sunni Resistance Committees; Muslim Youth	(Lebanon) Pro-Syrian government militias: Hezbollah; Light infantry; Mechanized infantry; Amal Movement; Syrian Social Nationalist Party; PFLP-GC; DFLP; Popular Nasserist Organization; As-Sa'iqa; Fatah al-Intifada; Arab Democratic Party (until 2014); Arab Movement Party; (Syria) Syrian Arab Republic: Syrian Armed Forces; Syrian Army; 1st Armoured Division; 3rd Armoured Division; Syrian Air Force; National Defense Force; Usud al-Cherubim; Ministry of Interior; Syrian Special Mission Forces; Supported by: Syria; Iran; Russia; Other militias: Lebanese Communist Party; Fatah	Islamic State of Iraq and the Levant (surrendered) (2013-17): Military of ISIL; Free Sunnis of Baalbek Brigade (2013–17); Qalamoun Emirate (2013–17); Damascus Emirate (2013–17); Supported by: Al-Nusra Front (2013–17)

=== Notes ===
^{a} The al-Nusra Front closely cooperated with ISIL between 2013 and 2014, were considered "frenemies" in 2015, and became embroiled in open conflict with it in 2017.

Military situation in Lebanon, as of 9 June 2017. Controlled by the Lebanese Government Controlled by Hezbollah Controlled by the Free Syrian Army and allies Controlled by Tahrir al-Sham and allies Controlled by the Islamic State of Iraq and the Levant (ISIL) (For a more detailed map, see Map of the Lebanese insurgency)

== See also ==
- List of armed groups in the Syrian Civil War
- List of armed groups in the War in Iraq (2013–2017)
- List of armed groups in the Libyan Civil War
- List of armed groups in the Yemeni Civil War
- Combatants of the Iraq War
