= Al-Shabab Al-Muslim =

- الشباب المسلم
- Dates active: ?-Present
- Country: Lebanon
- Ideology: Islamic extremism

Al-Shabab Al-Muslim (Arabic: الشباب المسلم, lit. 'Muslim Youth') is an Islamic Palestinian coalition made up of the organizations of Jund al-Sham, Fatah al-Islam, and other smaller organizations.

== History ==
The origins of the group are unknown though it's known that they are an Islamist organization based in Lebanon with a Palestinian majority, but they gained notoriety after the ambushed multiple security guards killing four of them, including Abu Ashraf al-Armoushi, a commander of the Fatah organization. Sources from local residents of the camp this occurred in that the perpetrator was an Islamist from the Al-Shabab Al-Muslim group though the actual perpetrator's identity is unknown. Originally, Osbat al-Ansar was blamed for the action of assassination due to the conflict that was already going on between them and Fatah and since it was in mostly Fatah-influenced area. This assassination led to a surge in violence between Islamist factions and the Lebanese army and Fatah causing clashes in the Ain al-Hilweh camp known as the 2023 Ain al-Hilweh clashes. During these clashes, Fatah launched a special operation targeting the homes of the leaders of both Al-Shabab Al-Muslim and Jund al-Sham which led to the death of the leaders afterwards.
