= Hisham Shreidi =

Hisham Shreidi (died 16 December 1991) lived in the Palestinian refugee camp of Ain al-Hilweh in Lebanon and was the founder of sunni extremist group Osbat al-Ansar. During the Lebanese Civil War in the 1980s Shreidi was a leader of the Islamic Association, a sunni fundamentalist group. However, in 1986 he was expelled due to his alleged ties with Iran. Shortly after being expelled from the Islamic Association Shreidi formed Osbat al-Ansar. In 1990 Shreidi and his group supported a failed uprising against the al-Fatah militia which dominated Ain al-Hilweh. On December 16, 1991, Shreidi was murdered by al-Fatah gunmen. His position in Osbat al-Ansar was succeeded by Abu Mohjen. His two sons Abdullah Shreidi and Mohammed Shreidi were also later assassinated apparently by al-Fatah. The elder brother Abdullah died from gunshot wounds in July 2003. Mohammed Shreidi died in February 2004 after attempting to lead Osbat al-Ansar in a turf war against al-Fatah in Ain al-Hilweh.
