= Ansar Allah (Lebanon) =

Militant organization in Lebanon

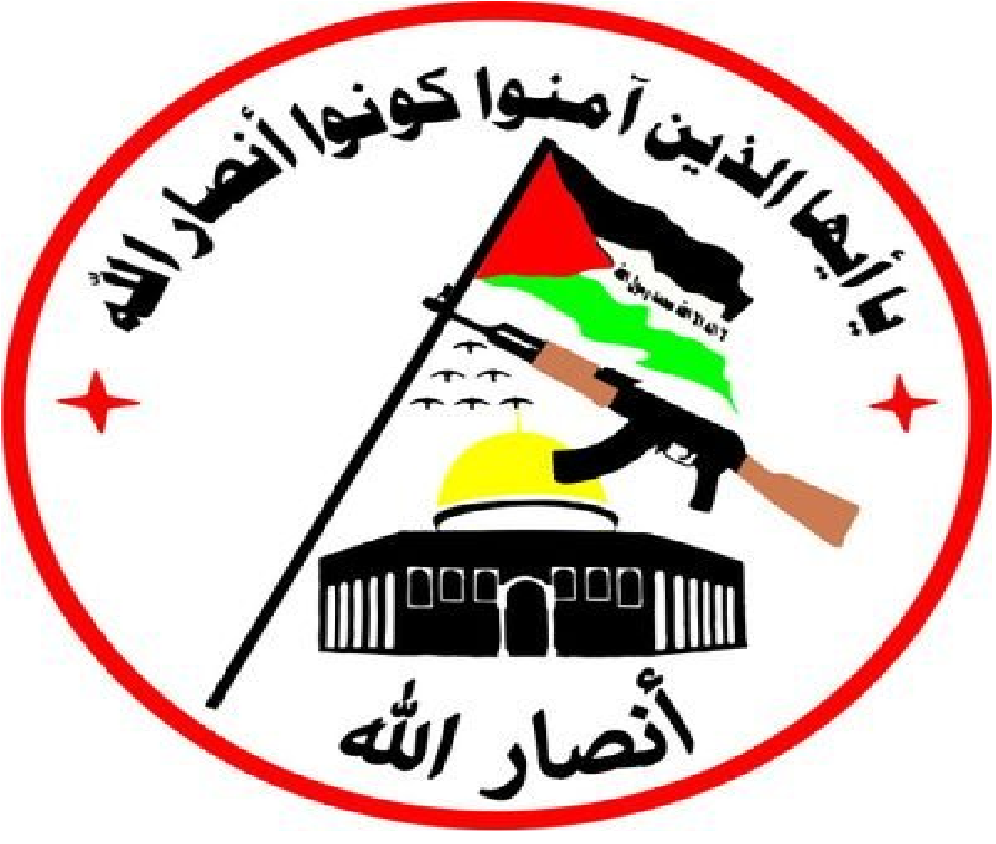
- Founder: Jamal Suleiman
- Leader: Sheikh Abu Ayoub
- Dates active: 1982 — present
- Allegiance: Hezbollah (1982-2012); Al-Shabab Al-Muslim (2023)
- Headquarters: Ain al-Hilweh
- Active regions: Lebanon; South America
- Ideology: Anti-Zionism; Islamism; Palestinian nationalism
- Wars: 1982 Lebanon War; 2023 Ain al-Hilweh clashes

The Ansar Allah Islamic Resistance Movement (Arabic: حركة أنصار الله للمقاومة الإسلامية, lit. 'Partisans of God Islamic Resistance Movement') is a militant organization in Lebanon.

== History ==
=== Foundation ===
The group was founded on 1982, during the 1982 Lebanon War, in Ain al-Hilweh, led by Jamal Suleiman, in alliance with Hezbollah and in opposition to the Palestinian party, Fatah.

=== Activities ===
In 2012, the group announced its separation from Hezbollah in a "military, security and political" manner and that "it would continue on the path of jihad and resistance until the liberation of all occupied Palestine".

The group's current leader is Sheikh Abu Ayoub, who controls two checkpoints in Ain al-Hilweh. In a historic meeting, on 2016, Jamal Suleiman, representing Ansar Allah, and Azzam al-Ahmad, representing Fatah, met to discuss issues such as the neutrality of Ain al-Hilweh.

During the 2023 Ain al-Hilweh clashes, the group participated within the coalition "Al-Shabab Al-Muslim", along with Asbat al-Ansar and Jund al-Sham.

== Attacks ==
The group carried out the AMIA bombing against the Asociación Mutual Israelita Argentina and the attack on Alas Chiricanas Flight 00901 in Panama, the responsibility was declared through leaflets distributed in Sidon and a statement in the Lebanese newspaper An-Nahar.
