= Mounif Salem Moussa =

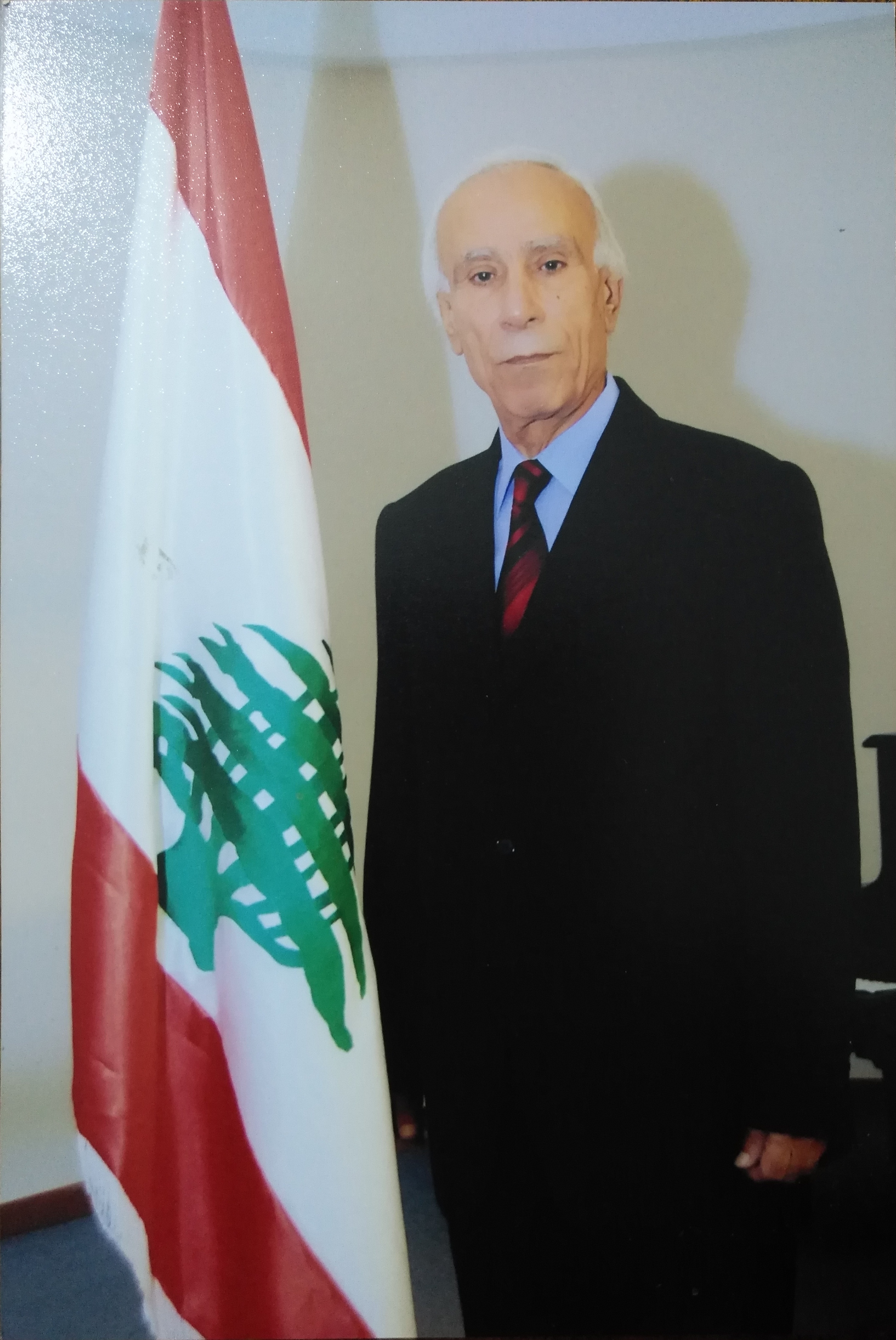
- Mounif Salem Moussa
- Born: March 15, 1940 (age 86); Miye ou Miye, Lebanon
- Died: 6-11-2019
- Occupations: Poet, sculpturist
- Writing career
- Notable work: Lover from Lebanon

Mounif Salem Moussa, (Arabic: منيف سالم موسى; born March 15, 1940, in Miye ou Miye, Southern Lebanon) is a critic, a researcher, a poet and a sculpturist. He participated in many sculpting and fine art events, conferences, seminars, literary and academic, where he displayed and sold some of his work. He has published a lot of literary and poetic compositions that drew a large number of fans. He gradually transitioned into academic writing and poetry. He is considered a criticizer, researcher and a poet, interested in literary and critical studies. He assumed the post of Professor of Faculty of Arts at the Lebanese University, Al Fanar, until retirement on March 15, 2004. He is still active and moves between Beirut and his hometown Miye ou Miye.

== Education ==
=== Early years ===
Mounif, attained his first studies at the Church in the village of Miye ou Miye. He attended public school, where he learned the principles of reading and shortly after that, he decided to take two years break from school. He returned to the Episcopal school in Ablah, Bekaa Valley, for a couple of years. Afterwards, he transferred to the public school in Miye ou Miye. He received the certificate of "brevet" from Sidon Middle School, where there he helped in writing at the school magazine. In 1958, he transferred to Sidon High School. At that point, he began writing literary essays in literary magazines and newspapers. Also, he won two certificates in Bible study.

=== Adult Years ===
In 1959, he quit school and joined the volunteers in the Lebanese Air Force for almost three years, 1959-1961. He returned to continue his studies at the Teachers Association in Sidon to prepare him to become a teacher. After he attained his degree from the Teachers Association, he went on to teach formally. He took six years break from teaching and focused on sculpting and participated in many modern art conventions. He returned to school and obtained a degree in Arabic Literature. He entered college and obtained two degrees from the Lebanese University at Beirut: Bachelor of Arts in Arabic Language and Literature; and Masters in Contemporary Literature. He went on to obtain two additional degrees from Saint Joseph University at Beirut: Doctorate in Modern Literature and Post Doctorate in Comparative Literary Criticism.

== Academic and Literary Roles ==
He taught at the Lebanese University and many private universities. He was promoted to a professor at the Lebanese University under Presidential Decree No. 2443. During the Lebanese civil war he lost his private library of six thousand books, when his house got burned. He retired at the legal age, and was given the title professor emeritus by the Lebanese University. He continuous to get involved in overlooking the doctoral dissertations and theses for graduate students.

== Work ==
Poetry:

- Lenny 1965
- Lover from Lebanon, 1992
- Book; The rhythms of love, 1999.

Modern Arabic poetry:

- Court prose of the Court of Arab modern poetry
- El Jahaz in his life, thought and literature
- Ameen Rihani in his life, thought and literature
- The heritage, originality and Gibran
- The view of poetry from the perspective of poetic critics.
- Slieman ElBoustani in his life, thought and literature
- Chapters of Literature Book
- Mohammed Fetouri poet of nationality emotions and love
- Poetry and criticism
- Tree of criticism.

== Seminars and conferences ==
Participated in conferences and seminars and numerous scientific academy in Lebanon and abroad. He went on televised broadcasts and mentioned in the print media. He was honored, mentioned and written about in the following newspapers and magazines just to mention a few: Al Nahar, El Dyar, El Sayad, El Anwar, El Hawadth, El Esboua El Arabi, El Hasna, El Asboua El Thaqafi, Homus, Halyat, Book of Arabs in Eloquence and Literature by Rabia Abu-Fadil
