= 2023 Ain al-Hilweh clashes =

Clash between Jund al-Sham, Lebanese Armed Forces and Fatah

Ain al-Hilweh clashes
Date	30 July – 3 August 2023; 8 – 15 September 2023
Location	Ain al-Hilweh Palestinian refugee camp in Lebanon
Status	Ceasefire reached

Belligerents
Al-Shabab Al-Muslim (Muslim Youth): Fatah al-Islam; (Palestine) Ansar Allah	(Lebanon) Lebanese Armed Forces	Fatah

Casualties and losses
2 killed	6 wounded	6 killed
- 30 deaths At least 200 injured

On 30 July 2023, fighting broke out inside the Ain al-Hilweh Palestinian refugee camp in Lebanon after Islamist gunmen tried to assassinate Fatah militant Mahmoud Khalil, killing a companion of his instead.

== Background ==
Ain al-Hilweh is a Palestinian refugee camp in the Sidon District. It was established in 1948 after the Palestinian exodus of the First Arab–Israeli War.

In the 1980s, most Palestinian refugee camps in Lebanon were dominated by Syrian-backed Palestinian groups. In the late 1980s, members of Yasser Arafat's Fatah movement, after being ousted in other refugee camps, moved on to Ain al-Hilweh. On 7 September 1990, after a three-day conflict with Abu Nidal's Fatah splinter faction, Fatah members were able to establish dominance in Ain al-Hilweh. Sixty-eight people were killed in the fighting and around 300 wounded. It left Fatah in control of an area from the eastern suburbs of Sidon to Iqlim al-Kharrub. Since then many illegal Palestinian militias and terrorist groups operate secretly in the refugee camp with violence occurring regularly. This is especially since, by convention, the Lebanese Armed Forces cannot enter Palestinian refugee camps in the country, leaving the factions themselves to handle security.

The camp is also home to approximately 30,000 Palestinian refugees displaced from the Nahr Al Bared camp where it was destroyed in 2007 during 4 months of deadly fighting between the Lebanese army and extremist groups. Some of the militants expanded into Ain el-Helweh.

== Events ==
=== 30 July–3 August ===
In the first day of clashes, Islamist militants ambushed a Fatah military general in a parking lot, killing him and three bodyguards. The general was identified as Abu Ashraf al Armoushi. Source from the camp said an Islamist from "the al-Shabab al-Muslim group" was also killed and six others including the group's leader were wounded.

Fighting continued the next day, with six more people being killed, bringing the death toll to eleven. More than 40 people were injured. A ceasefire was agreed on at 6:00pm during a meeting of Palestinian factions including Fatah and was also attended by members of the Lebanese Amal and Hezbollah. UNRWA has suspended services within the camp due to the violence but had opened its schools to families fleeing the fighting. More than 2,000 people left the camp amid the fighting. Lebanese MP Ousama Saad hosted a meeting in the headquarters of the Popular Nasserist Organisation. It had the presence of the delegation of the Palestine Liberation Organization, factions of the Palestinian Coalition Forces represented by Ayman Shana'a, "Ansar Allah", and members of Lebanese Islamic parties.

According to the Lebanese Armed Forces a mortar shell hit a military barracks outside the camp and wounded one soldier, whose condition is stable.

=== September 8–15 ===
Clashes were resumed again on September 8, despite an uneasy truce between the militants on August 3, as the accused killer of the Fatah official was not handed over to Lebanese Judiciary. The Palestinian authority in the camp announced on Tuesday that their security forces would launch raids in the camp in search of the accused killers. Fatah officials said that the Islamist group launched an attack on September 7 to obstruct Fatah's plans to remove militants from schools they had been occupying. Five people were killed and more than 50 have been injured in the subsequent clashes, including three civil defense volunteers who came under shelling. By September 11, five more people have died in the clashes, bringing the death toll to ten. The casualties were identified as six Fatah fighters, two Islamist militants were and two civilians.

=== Ceasefire ===
After numerous failures and breaches of ceasefires, a final truce was agreed upon on September 14. The agreement came after the speaker of the Lebanese parliament Nabih Berri met with Fatah and Hamas leaders the same day. It was agreed that the killers of Al Armoushi would be handed over to the camp authorities.

On 29 September, Palestinian security forces were deployed Friday in a school complex at Ain el-Hilweh replacing the gunmen who had occupied it since the beginning of the clashes. This aims to ensure the security of schools as they will begin late in early October. The security force includes 55 militiamen of various groups which includes the Democratic Front for the Liberation of Palestine and Asbat al-Ansar.

== Reactions ==
=== International ===
- Palestine – President of the State of Palestine Mahmoud Abbas stated: "The heinous massacre and the terrorist assassination of national security forces who were working hard to maintain the safety and security of the camp and its residents"
- Saudi Arabia along with other Gulf and European countries, announces travel restrictions and bans in Lebanon after the Ain al-Hilweh clashes and urged their citizens to flee the country.

=== Internal ===
- (Palestine) Fatah – During the funeral of al-Armoushi, Jalal Abuchehab, a Fatah official at al-Rashidieh camp, stated "This heinous crime doesn't benefit anyone but the enemy, and that is the Zionists, because they are the primary and only beneficiary".
- Lebanon – Caretaker Prime Minister Najib Mikati suspects that foreign intervention is at play to "exploit Lebanon's" arena he also added: "We call upon Palestinian authorities to cooperate with the army in stabilizing the security situation and handing over those who disrupt peace to Lebanese authorities," Mikati stated. During the second phase of the fighting Mikati threatens with military intervention in the camp stating a “flagrant violation of Lebanese sovereignty” and “it was unacceptable for the warring Palestinian groups to terrorize the Lebanese”.

== See also ==
- Palestinian insurgency in South Lebanon
