= Kamal Naji =

Palestinian politician

- Born: 1951; Jabalia Camp
- Died: 23 March 2009 (aged 57–58); Mieh Mieh camp

Kamal Naji (Arabic: كمال ناجي) also known as Kamal Medhat (Arabic: كمال مدحت; 1951 – 23 March 2009) was the deputy representative of the Palestinian Liberation Organization (PLO) in Lebanon and a former Fatah intelligence chief in the country. He was killed by a roadside bomb while visiting a refugee camp to calm recent violence.

== Early life and activities ==
Born in the Jabalia Camp in the Gaza Strip in 1951, Naji relocated to Lebanon when he joined Fatah at age 16. Naji was a confidant of Yasser Arafat and Khalil al-Wazir. While the PLO was based in Lebanon in the late 1970s and early 1980s, Naji served as a close aide to Arafat.

In reference to the 2008–2009 Israel–Gaza conflict, he stated "If Yasser Arafat was alive he would have started a third intifada and managed to make the Muqata'ah the headquarters of the resistance and all kinds of envoys would be knocking on his door looking for a solution to end the fighting in Gaza." He served as deputy head of the Palestine Liberation Organisation in Lebanon.

== Death ==
On 23 March 2009, Naji and three others were killed when a roadside bomb exploded as his convoy was passing the Kifah el Musallah security check point to Mieh Mieh camp near Sidon. There had been a family feud the previous day, in which two Fatah members were killed, and Naji was visiting to send his condolences and attempt to calm the situation. The bomb was apparently hidden in a little shed on the side of the road and was detonated when Naji's convoy passed by. His car was thrown down a hill and reduced to a charred wreck, according to reporters at the scene of the explosion. The Palestinian factions of Lebanon's 12 refugee camps met in Ain al-Hilweh to discuss the incident and aim to uncover the perpetrators of the attack. The size of the bomb was estimated at 25 kg.

=== Reactions ===
Edward Kattoura, a Fatah official in Lebanon accused Israel of assassinating Naji, stating, "According to the style of the operation it seems that Israel is behind this, because it is a very highly professional execution... We don't think the execution is related to the Palestinian problem as it is targeting the stable situation in Lebanon and in the Palestinian [refugee] camps."

Osama Hamdan, the Hamas representative of Lebanon, said Naji had played a role in helping to ease tensions among the Palestinian factions in the country. "It is not possible to speculate on who committed this crime," he told Hezbollah's al-Manar television station. The office of Palestinian President Mahmoud Abbas issued a statement condemning the killing. "President Abbas condemns the terrorist crime that targeted Major-General Kamal Naji. He dedicated his life to serve his people and his cause."

Walid Jumblatt, Progressive Socialist Party (PSP) leader paid a visit to Zaki to offer condolences. "I extend my condolences to the Fatah party and the Palestinian National Authority. Fatah has always sacrificed its prominent members, for the Palestinian cause," Jumblatt told reporters afterward.

Lebanese Forces leader Samir Geagea also condemned the killing saying it was a "terrorist attack" that targeted both Lebanese and Palestinian stability. Geagea called on the Palestinians to unite around their "just cause" and to stay away from conflicts that would "drain their will to persevere."

United Nations Secretary-General Ban Ki-moon condemned the "terrorist" attack. According to a statement from his press office, "The secretary-general condemns the terrorist attack today", adding that the UN chief hoped "the perpetrators of this crime will be brought to justice promptly." Ban added "Such actions must not be allowed to endanger the climate of calm that currently prevails in Lebanon."
