= Mieh Mieh refugee camp =

Palestinian refugee camp near Sidon, southern Lebanon

Mieh Mieh Refugee Camp مخيم المية مية
- Refugee camp
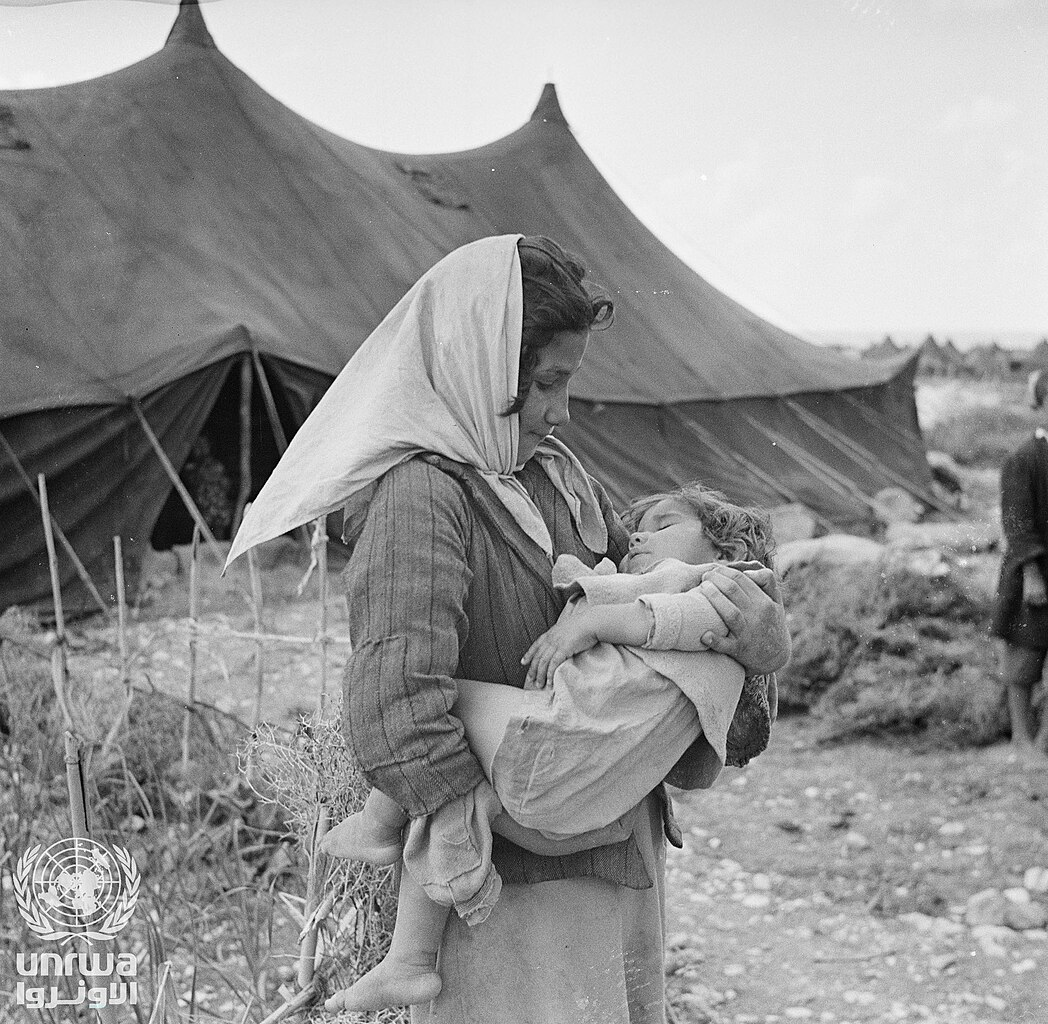
- A Palestine refugee girl carries her sleeping baby sister in the newly formed Mia Mia camp, 1949.

- Location within Lebanon
- Coordinates: 33°32′30″N 35°23′29″E
- Country: Lebanon
- Governorate: South Governorate
- District: Sidon District
- Town: Miye ou Miye

Population
  - Estimate (2003): 5,000
- Time zone: UTC+2 (EET)

Mieh Mieh refugee camp (Arabic: مخيم المية مية, romanized: Mukhayyam al-Mayyah Mayyah), also spelled Mia Mia, is a Palestinian refugee camp in Lebanon, located on the outskirts of Mieh Mieh village in the hills 4 kilometers (2.5 mi) east of the southern city of Sidon. The original refugees in the camp generally came from Saffourieh, Tiereh, Haifa and Miron, in what is now Israel. It was established in 1954 on land leased from private landowners of the Miye ou Miye village. Around the 1990s, the Mieh Mieh camp was located on 60 dunams (15 acres) in Miye ou Miye village. Today, the camp is 1.8 times that size at 108 dunams (27 acres). In 2003, it had a population of 5,037.

During the Lebanese Civil War, 15% of the camp's shelters, as well as the United Nations Relief and Works Agency school and distribution center were destroyed.

On 4 July 1991, following the failure of disarmament negotiations, as required by the Taif agreement, the Lebanese Army attacked Palestinian positions in Southern Lebanon. The offensive, involving 10,000 troops against an estimated 5,000 militia, lasted 3 days and ended with the Army taking all the Palestinian positions around Sidon. In the agreement that followed all heavy weapons were surrendered and infantry weapons only allowed in the two refugee camps, Ain al-Hilweh and Mieh Mieh. 73 people were killed in the fighting, and 200 wounded, mostly Palestinian.

The socio-economic situation of the refugees is described by the UNRWA as "extremely difficult". Men find work as daily-paid laborers on construction sites and in orchards. Women work in orchards, in embroidery workshops and as cleaners. All shelters are supplied with water through a network connected to the Agency's water plant. Al-Najdeh Al-Sha'bieh is the only NGO active in Mieh Mieh and provides house decorating courses for Palestinian youths. There are two UNRWA elementary/preparatory schools in the camp, which had an enrollment of 1,020 pupils in 2003/04.

Two people were killed in a gun battle in Mieh Mieh camp on 21 March 2009. Kamal Naji (also known as Kamal Medhat), the deputy head of the Palestine Liberation Organisation in Lebanon, visited the camp to calm the situation on 23 March 2009. Shortly after leaving the camp, a roadside bomb killed him and three others, close to Mieh Mieh.

Clashes between Hezbollah-linked Ansar Allah and the Fatah movement broke out at the camp on 15 October 2018 resulting in a siege of the Ansar Allah zone in the camp and the flight of many residents from the camp. A deal to end the clashes and restore stability and normal life in the camp was brokered by Hezbollah (though Hamas also claims credit for negotiating the deal) in early November 2018. The clashes had left four people dead and 30 others wounded, and caused huge damage to properties. Under the deal, o 7 November 2018, Ansar Allah Secretary-General Jamal Suleiman was evacuated from the Mieh Mieh refugee camp to Syria, along with 20 family members and bodyguards, under and supervised by the Amal movement and Hezbollah. Ansar Allah was founded in the 1990s by Jamal Suleiman who had been a Fatah activist but gravitated to align himself with Hezbollah and the Amal movement during the Lebanese Civil War.
