= Ahmed Abd al-Karim al-Saadi =

Leader of Osbat al-Ansar
- Incumbent
- Assumed office 1991

Ahmed Abd al-Karim al-Saadi aka Abu Mohjen is a Palestinian who became the leader of Osbat al-Ansar in 1991 after founder Sheik Hisham Shreidi was killed by Fatah rivals. Abu Mohjen is believed to have been behind the transformation of Osbat al-Ansar from a Palestinian-centered militant group into an al-Qaeda supported pan-Islamic organization.

Abu Mohjen has been sentenced to death in absentia by Lebanon; however, his sentence was later reduced to 20 years hard labor. After being sentenced by the Lebanese government Abu Mohjen has remained in hiding. It is assumed that his brother Abu Tarek al-Saadi has assumed control of Osbat al-Ansar while Abu Mohjen remains in hiding either in Iraq or in the Palestinian refugee camp of Ain al-Hilweh.

== See also ==
- List of fugitives from justice who disappeared
