= Arine Sports Club =

- Founded: February 10, 1954
- Arena: Nasri Wakim Arena
- Location: Miye ou Miye
- Team colors: Gold, Royal Blue, black, white
Home	Away

Arine Sports Club (ASC) (Arabic: نادي العرين الرياضي) was created on February 10, 1954. It is a multi-sports club based in Miye ou Miye, Lebanon. The co-founders are: George Khoury Wakim (President), Girigi (a.k.a. Giris) Hanna Saikali, Tanous Joubran Wakim, and Nasri Youssef Wakim. The club competes in volleyball, basketball and indoor soccer (football) games.

== Arena ==
Nasri Wakim's Arena is located in Beaula Neighborhood (33°32′31.186″N 35°23′47.011″E) in Miye ou Miye, Lebanon.

== Competitions ==
The competitions are held against teams from adjacent villages, cities and different military branches in different games. To name a few: Sidon, Aind Ed Delb, Maghdouche, Kafer Hata, Lebaa, Qraiyeh, Darb El Sim, Jensnaya, Baissour, Mharbiyeh, and Lebanese army. This list is not all inclusive.

== Recognitions ==
The teams (volleyball, basketball and indoor football) at the club won trophies and are at display. In recognition of their achievements local sponsors and politicians contribute to the success of the club.

== Photos ==
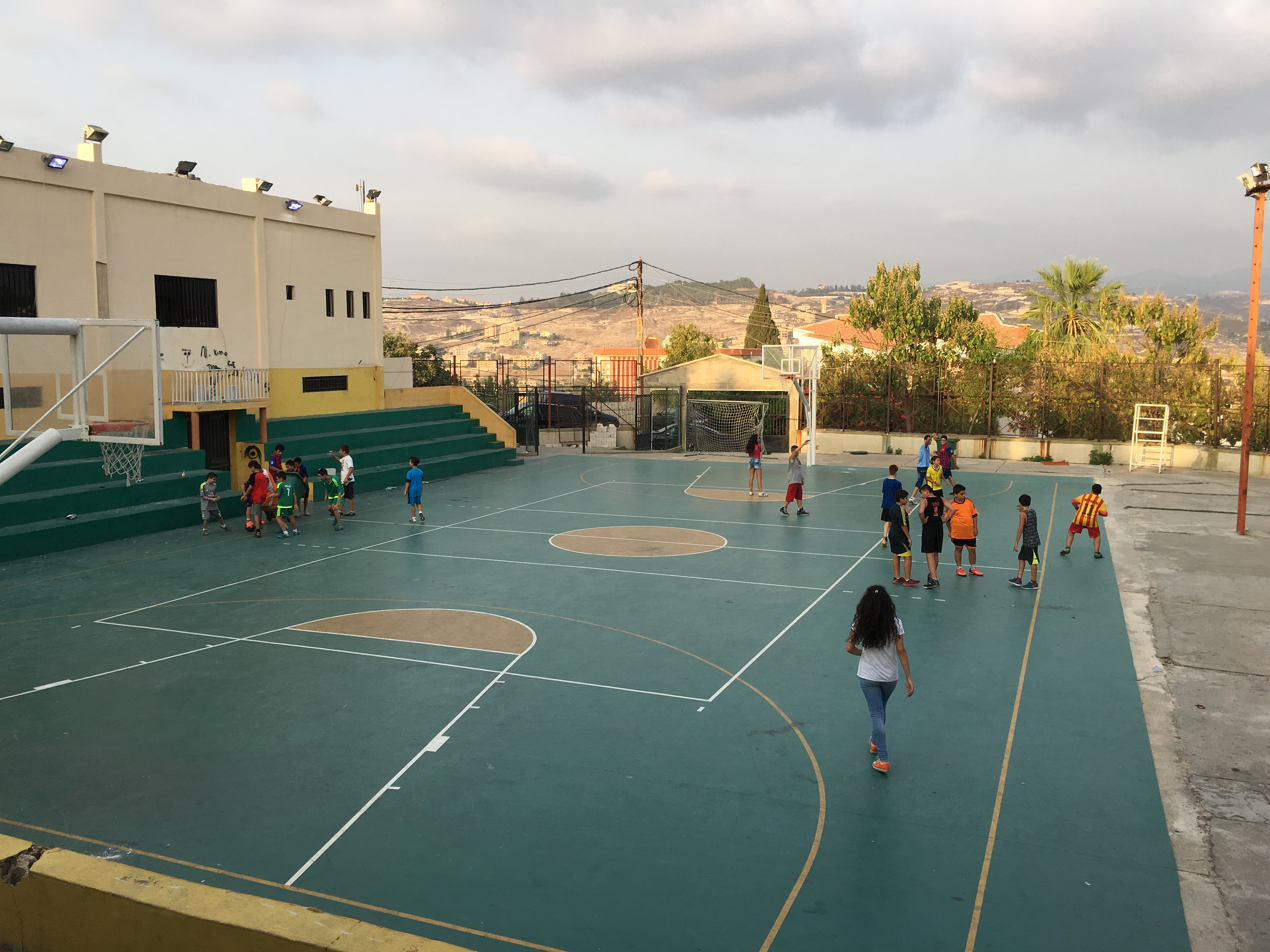
Arine Sports Club, at Nasri Wakim Arena
