= Zaghdraiya =

Zaghdraiya زغدرايا
- Municipality
- Location in Lebanon
- Coordinates: 33°31′32″N 35°24′8″E
- Country: Lebanon
- Governorate: South Governorate
- District: Sidon District
- Time zone: UTC+2 (EET)
  - Summer (DST): UTC+3 (EEST)
- Postal code: 2018
- Area code: 07

Zaghdraiya (Arabic: زغدرايا, romanized: Zaghdrāyā) is a municipality in the South Governorate in Lebanon. It is located southeast of Sidon. The village is bordered with a number of villages/towns like Darb es Sim, Maghdouche, Miye ou Miye. It has a small population and is mainly formed by a few houses and little agricultural space.

The word Zaghdraiya means "castle" or "fortress" possibly because the village is surrounded by hill tops in almost every direction.

== History ==
In 1875, Victor Guérin found it to be a village of 150 Metualis, who planted figs and olives in the environment.

The town saw many struggles between its political party branches of various militias during the Lebanese Civil War

== Demographics ==
In 2014, Muslims made up 99.24% of registered voters in Zaghdraiya. 94.66% of the voters were Shiite Muslims.

A few Palestinian refugees inhabit the town as well.

== Sights ==
The town is mostly an agricultural landscape with many olive, lemon, fig, orange, loquat (Akkidenia), and green almond trees. the town produces grapes, green beans, and jujubes. The Siniq river passes through the village and is usually the source of irrigation of these crops. The town overlooks hills of southern Lebanon due to it being predominantly uninhabited landscapes and rarely any tall buildings.

== Bibliography ==
- Guérin, V. (1880). Description Géographique Historique et Archéologique de la Palestine (in French). Vol. 3: Galilee, pt. 2. Paris: L'Imprimerie Nationale.
