= Miye ou Miye =

Miye ou Miye المية ومية
- Municipality
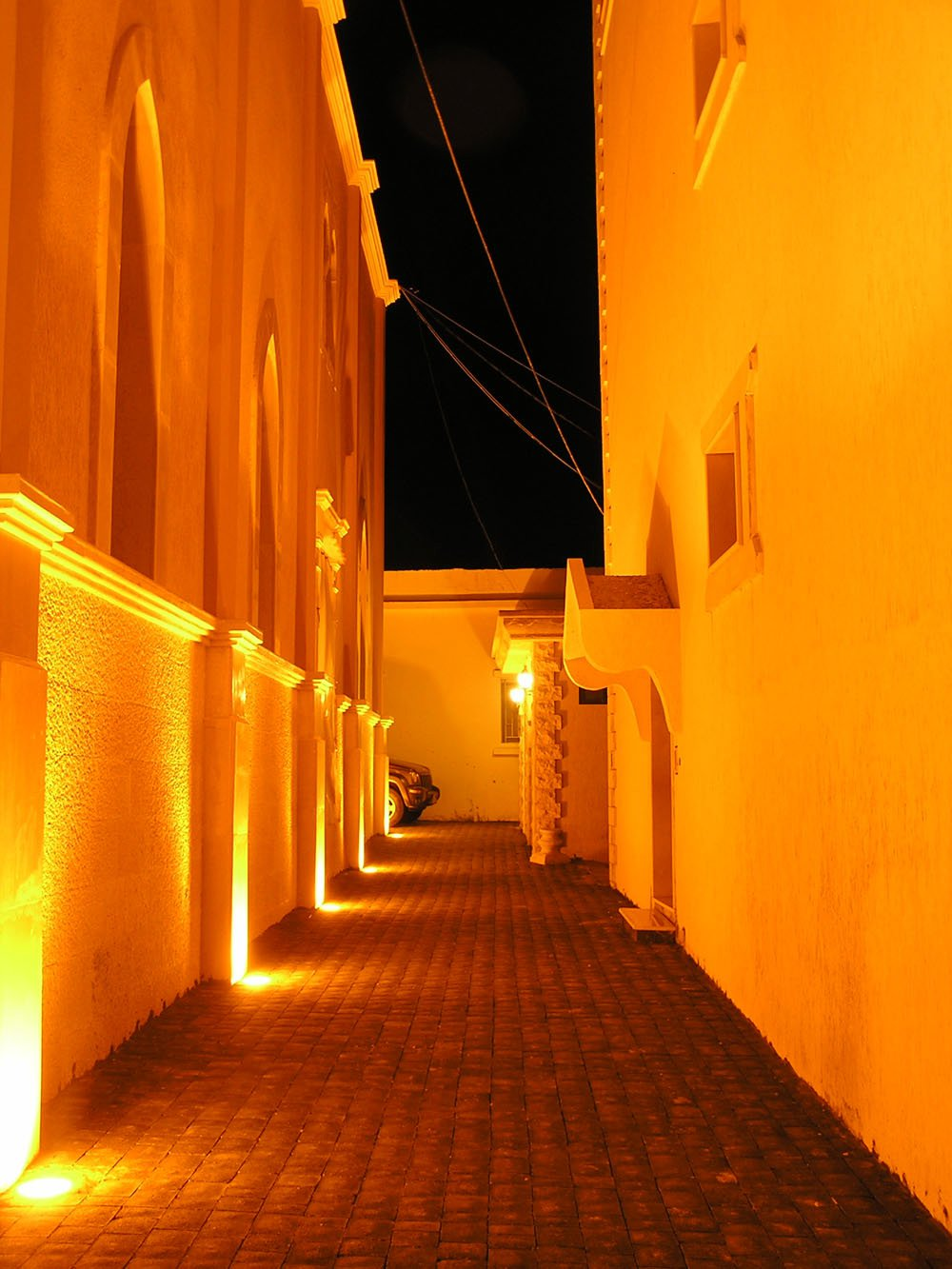

- Location in Lebanon
- Coordinates: 33°32′31″N 35°23′51″E
- Country: Lebanon
- Governorate: South Governorate
- District: Sidon District

Government
  - Type: Mayor–council
  - Body: Miye ou Miye municipality
  - Mayor: Ghassan Youssef Wakim

Area
  - Total: 5.05 km^{2} (1.95 sq mi)
- Highest elevation: 208 m (682 ft)
- Lowest elevation: 29 m (95 ft)
- Time zone: UTC+2 (EET)
  - Summer (DST): UTC+3 (EEST)
- Postal code: 6126
- Dialing code: 00961 (7) Landline
- Website: www.miyeoumiye.com

Miye ou Miye (Arabic: المية ومية, romanized: al-Miyeh Ūmiyeh) is a municipality in southern Lebanon located 5 km (3.2 mi) East of Sidon and 45 km (28 mi) south of the capital Beirut and it overlooks the Mediterranean Sea. The village lies at an average altitude of 156 m (512 ft) above sea level. Miye ou Miyes' surface (with houses built on it) stretches for 230 hectares (2.3 km² - 0.8878 mi²). The village is bordered with a number of villages/towns: East: Qraiyeh, Ain El Delb; West: Sidon; North: Haret Saida; and South: Darb es Sim, Zaghdraiya.

== Etymology ==
Legend has it there are three possible root words for the name of the town Miye ou Miye:

- It stems from the Phoenician language “Mio Mia”, which means a place where there is mummification water; In fact, there are many Phoenician tombs located at Beirut National Museum that were found by the Missionary Dr. George Ford while building Gerard Institute for the boys (1881) and other facilities and halls on Miye ou Miye land. This is the most likely explanation for the name of the town.
- It also comes from the Arabic language meaning “mieyya ”, which means one hundred. During a census of the number of villages that the Druze won in war during the 1800s in the Iqlim al-Tuffah; Miye ou Miye the village, was number 200 on the roster. They presented their winnings in a batch format of 100. We won "mieyya" and this is the second "mieyya". So, it was named Miye ou Miye.
- Due to abundance of water in the area, the village was named Mayya w Mayya, meaning water and water in Assyrian.

== Demographics ==
In 2014 Christians made up 98.70% of registered voters in Miye ou Miye. 79.95% of the voters were Greek Catholics.

Miye ou Miye’s population prior to 1985, which is when the town was attacked during the civil war, was around 5000+ inhabitants. Due to the displacement by the civil war; about half the population migrated to Western countries, about a quarter moved to the capital, Beirut, and the rest returned and settled in Miye ou Miye. Miye ou Miye is a Christian village. The people of Miye ou Miye are mostly members of the Melkite Greek Catholic Church (85%), with a few Maronites (7%), Protestants (6%), and Baptists (2%). The population of the town doubles when the immigrants / expatriates return to spend their summer vacations in their ancestral home.

== Neighborhoods ==
- Aawad
- Achrafieh Downer
- Achrafieh Upper
- Ain Zaytoun
- Ataaht
- Beaula
- Chaby
- Church
- El Aarid
- El Aayar
- El Bir (Bir Toufic)
- El Birki
- El Byader
- El Furn
- El Hirish
- El Houch
- El Khaly
- El Khirby
- El Mahafar
- El Roos
- El Sahle
- Jel El Taweel
- Jel El Aajil
- Jel El Aqil
- Jel El Achkar
- Jelali El Aabdy
- Jib El Houn
- Jlaa El Dine
- Jlaly El Aanib
- Karem El Razin
- Karm El Sowan
- Khandaq El Wawoeeyah
- Khlali
- Mghariq
- Nabaat Mar Giryos
- Sbeil
- Skaykini
- Tourbit Shiry

== History ==
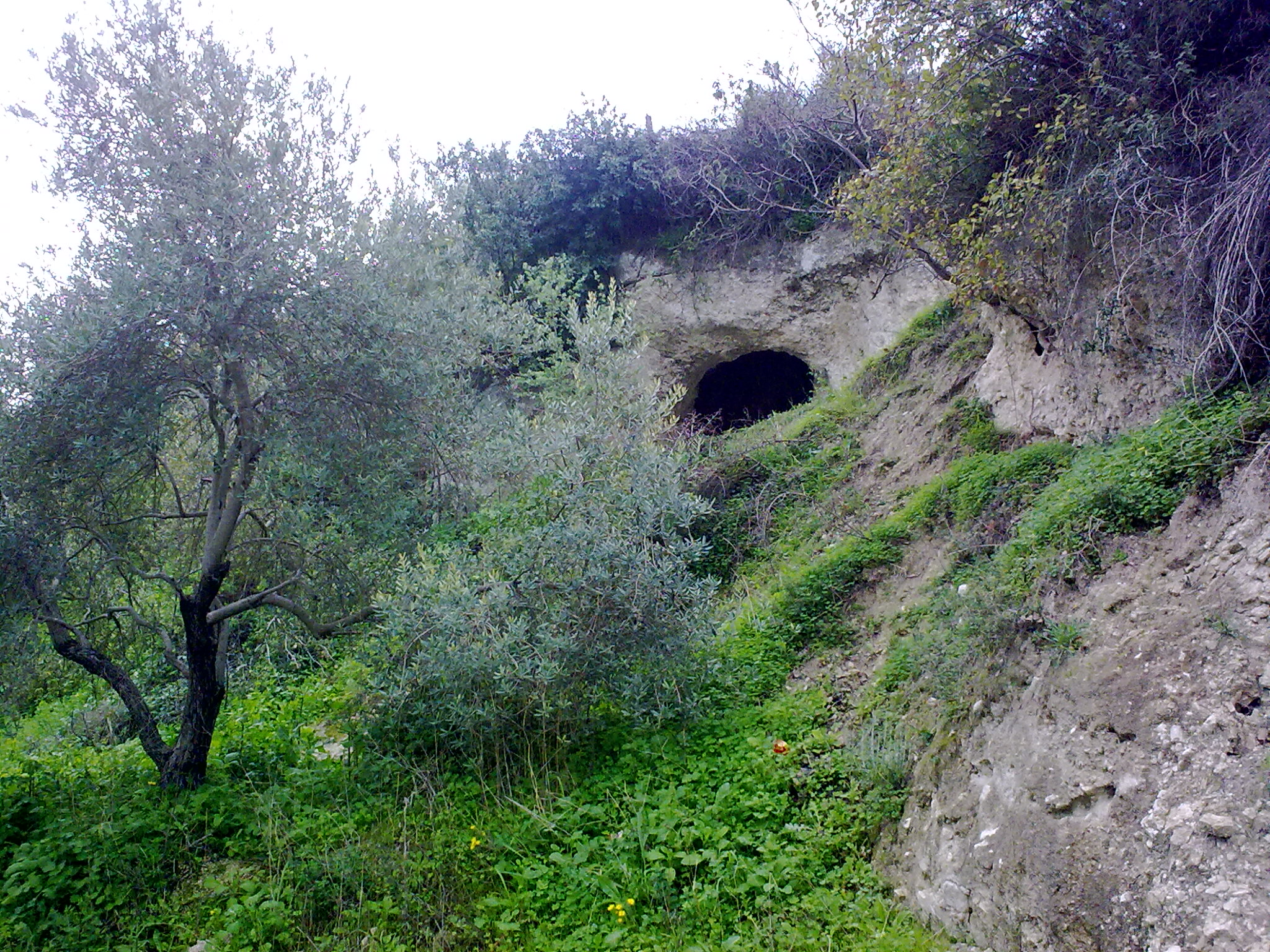
Phoenician Cave in Miye ou Miye

In the 17th century, Miye ou Miye was mostly farmland owned by a number of wealthy families. The families of "Abu Nakad" and "Faddoul" owned half of the land and the state owned the rest. In the 18th century, Christians started to move to the village, and the state encouraged the farmers by giving them land to farm. The farmers in return had to pay back 10% of the crops. In 1875 Victor Guérin found the village to have 400 inhabitants, some Maronites and some Greek Orthodox.

In the 19th century, American missionaries came to the village for missionary work. In 1985, the Lebanese Civil War spread to South Lebanon, and the villagers fled for their safety farther south and others went to the capital. From there they started their journey abroad to over 26 countries. The majority went to the United States of America, Canada, and Australia. In August 1991, the Miye ou Miye refugees returned and started rebuilding the village that was destroyed completely. Today, Miye ou Miye is full of life and it became better than it was before the war. Immigrants, who are living away from their hometown, carried their little town in their hearts along with deep pride of their heritage. This deep love and passion guided them in their daily lives and provided a moral compass.

The Miye ou Miye population includes the following families:

- Abdallah
- Abou Zeid
- Abou Chaar
- Andraos
- Asaad
- Bou Saba
- Chemali
- Costantin
- Dib
- Francis
- Ghassan
- Haikal
- Hayek
- Jabbour
- Khoury
- Kozhaya
- Makhoul
- Matta
- Moussa
- Nahed
- Najem
- Saikaly
- Saliba
- Semaan
- Shehabi
- Stephan
- Wakim

== Culture and art ==
- Every year in the middle of July, Arine Sports Club (Arabic: نادي العرين الرياضي) and Miye ou Miye municipality hold a two-week athletic festiva. Also, an infirmary or a clinic is located in town to provide medical care mainly to the elderly.

== Economy ==
Miye ou Miye's main industry is agriculture. The town produces olive oil, edible olives, figs, and loquat (acadinia, pi-pa, mespila). Livelihood from agricultural and farming products dwindled with time.

== Panoramic view ==
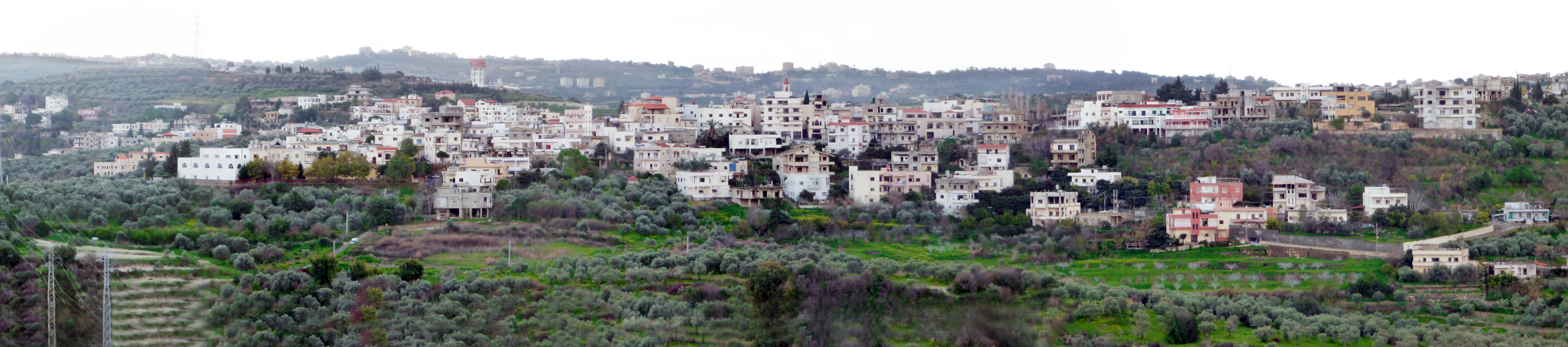
Miye ou Miye from Talet Mar Elias (Saint Elias Hill)
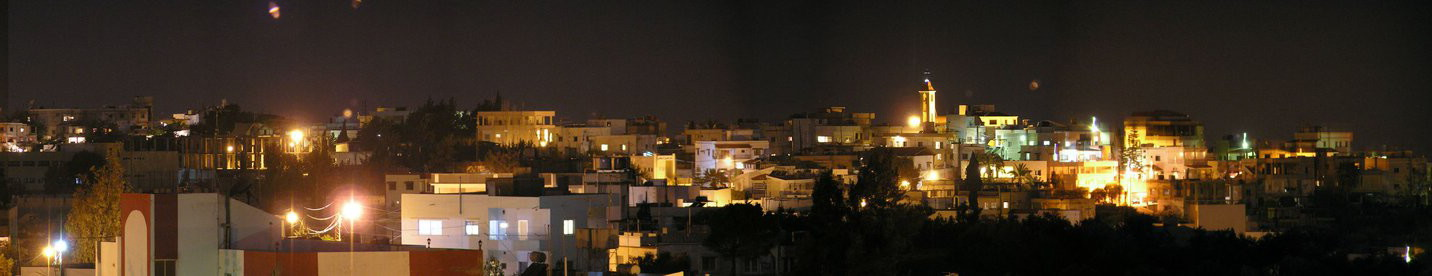
Miye ou Miye at Night

== Education ==
- National Evangelical School for Girls and Boys
- Miye ou Miye High School

== Health ==
- Miye ou Miye Clinic
- Hariri Clinic
- Sidon Governmental Hospital
- El Hamshary Hospital

== Institutions ==
- Arine Sports Club
- Miye ou Miye Senior's Club
- Officer's Military Club & Compound

== Landscape ==
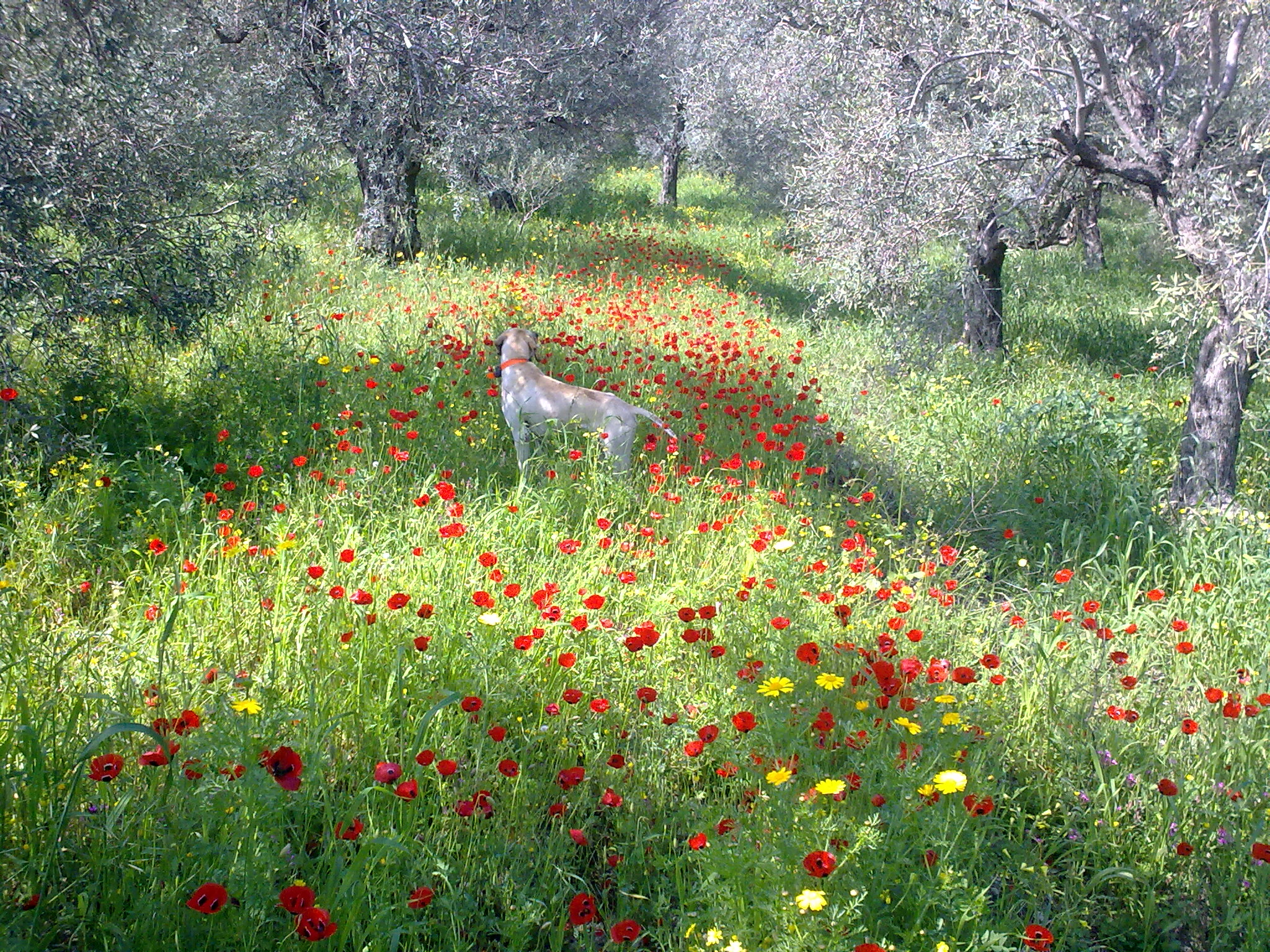
Spring in Miye ou Miye with olive trees in the background

Landscape in Miye ou Miye Matthews Vegetation Zone: evergreen broadleaved shrub land/thicket and evergreen dwarf shrub land. The soil type: luvisols, cambisols (LV), soil with clay-enriched lower horizon, high CEC, and high saturation bases. There is no malaria occurrence. Miye ou Miye is in a very strong (vii) earthquake zone on average one every 50 years, with occurrences of earthquakes at 6-7 Richter scale. There is a medium to high occurrence of flooding with a risk factor of 7 out of 10. Also, drought is an issue in the town with a risk factor of 9 out of 10.

== Weather ==
Miye ou Miye experiences temperate climatic conditions with clearly defined seasons. Summers are hot and dry, while winters are cold and wet. The temperatures in Miye ou Miye are considered mild and humid climate. Summer spans the months of June to September and is the most popular time to visit, with temperatures peaking in July and August. At their hottest, summer days reach about 31 °C ( 88 °F) and occasional heat weave conditions. Winter takes charge from December to March and during this time, Miye ou Miye sees a great deal of rain. Winter conditions are much milder with the mercury rarely dropping below 11 °C (52 °F).

Miye ou Miye, experiences شلوق shlūq winds (also known as Sirocco in Europe and Khamaseen in Northern Africa). These winds are most common during autumn and spring seasons. Shlūq winds are red Sahara dust and is associated with storms and heavy rain, the wind being very strong, the duration may be as short as half a day or may last several days (usually four days).

Climate data for Miye ou Miye, Lebanon
Month	Jan	Feb	Mar	Apr	May	Jun	Jul	Aug	Sep	Oct	Nov	Dec	Year
Mean daily maximum °C (°F)	12.0 (53.6)	16.0 (60.8)	19.0 (66.2)	22.0 (71.6)	26.0 (78.8)	27.0 (80.6)	29.0 (84.2)	29.0 (84.2)	29.0 (84.2)	25 (77)	19.0 (66.2)	13.0 (55.4)	22.2 (71.9)
Mean daily minimum °C (°F)	9.0 (48.2)	12.0 (53.6)	16.0 (60.8)	19.0 (66.2)	23.0 (73.4)	24.0 (75.2)	26.0 (78.8)	25 (77)	26.0 (78.8)	21.0 (69.8)	16.0 (60.8)	10 (50)	18.9 (66.1)
Average precipitation mm (inches)	305 (12.02)	125 (4.91)	31 (1.21)	89 (3.52)	31 (1.21)	15 (.59)	0 (0)	0.51 (.02)	1.5 (.06)	120 (4.8)	51 (2.02)	215 (8.47)	986 (38.83)
Average precipitation days (≥ 0.25 mm)	16	11	8	13	19	9	0	2	2	18	15	22	135
Average relative humidity (%)	77	63	59	58	53	61	60	66	61	59	60	77	63
Mean monthly sunshine hours	142	159.5	239	307	335	346.5	387.5	384.5	303	250	194.5	129	3,177.5
Source: World Weather Online,

== Parks and recreation ==
Miye ou Miye Park was created in 2001.

Byader Park is used for religious activities and athletic events.

== Religious & historical Sites ==
Saint Georges Spring (Nabaat Mar Giryos)

A shepherd from the village had several different dreams during a period of time. Always in these dreams, a knight (ref: rider, Saint George) was riding a white horse, while the shepherd was herding his sheep. In each dream, the knight told the shepherd to tell the mayor and the priest of the village to dig in this particular spot (33°32′45.00″N 35°23′16.98″E) and your town will have a natural water spring. And the rider added, in case the people in town did not believe you; take this olive branch with fruits on it as a proof. When this event occurred, the harvest of the olive fruit was long gone. The people of the village did not believe the shepherd at first, until he showed them the olive branch with the fruits on it. They dug where Saint Georges pointed, and water came out. St. Georges Natural Spring became a holy place and is called in Arabic “Nabaat Mar Giryos". The natural spring became the destination for many people, mainly for praying and healing. The elderly in the village are still telling this story from generation to generation. Unfortunately, after the civil war in 1985 in Miye ou Miye and the displacement of the town's people, the St. George's natural spring was bulldozed and covered with dirt and debris.

Ramapo Hall

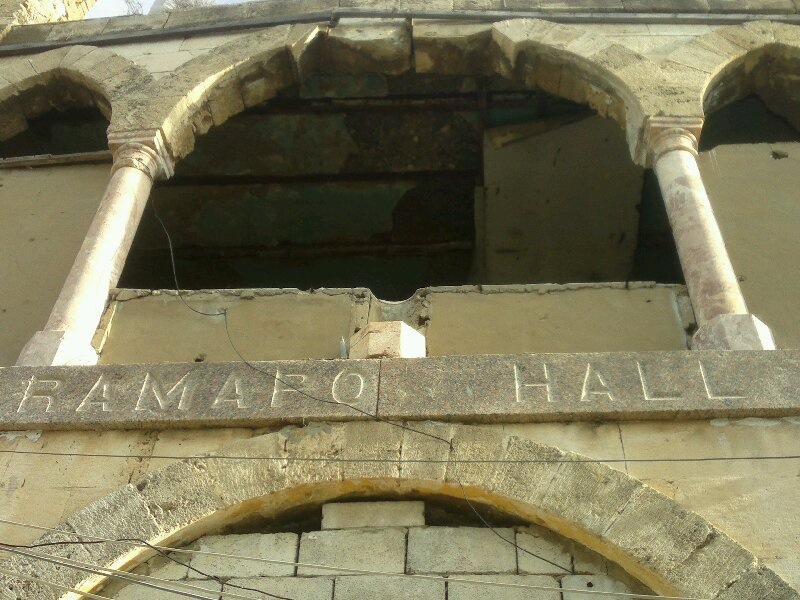
Upward Frontal View. Present Day (December 8, 2012)

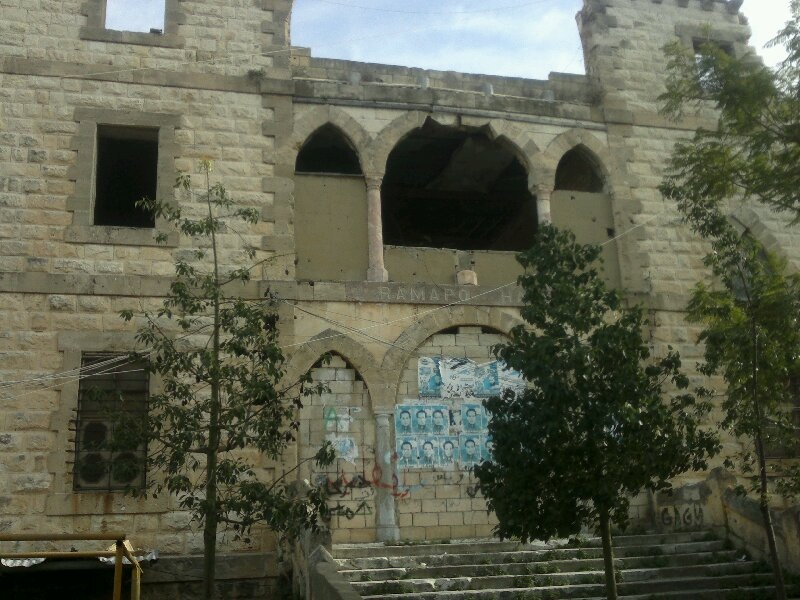
Front View. Present Day (December 8, 2012)

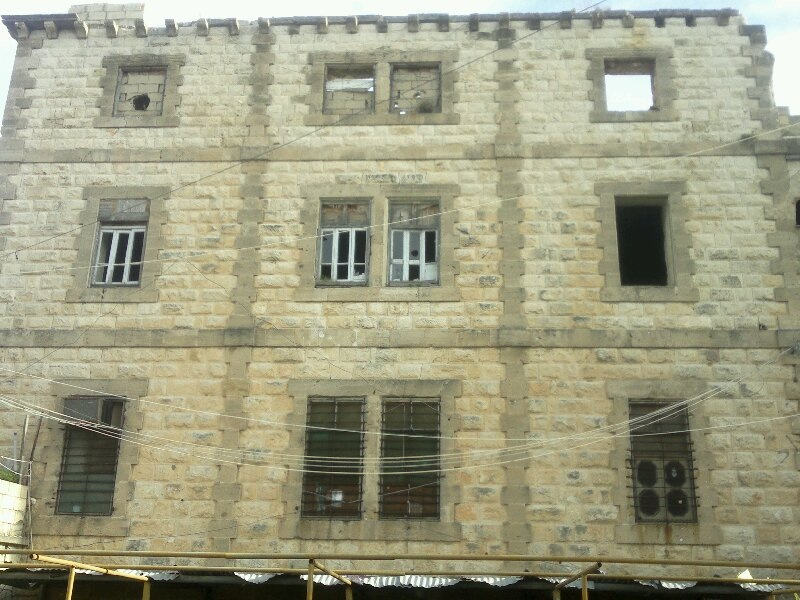
Side View. Present Day (December 8, 2012)

National Evangelical Institute for Girls and Boys is one of the National Evangelical Synod Schools in Lebanon. It is a private school and the union of two old and historical famous institutions: Sidon Evangelical School for Girls (SESG) that was first founded in 1862 and Gerard Institute for the boys that was first founded in 1881 by the missionaries Rev. William King Eddy and Dr. George Ford. Dr. Ford had a grander vision of building an orphanage and other facilities in Miye ou Miye hilltop overlooking the ancient city of Sidon. But since he was in need of funds to build it, he traveled to Ramapo, New York, and secured donations from the local Christian community. The word Ramapo (Ramapough), is from Native American origin, meaning either "sweet water" or "sloping/slanting rocks". In 1881, with the donation money secured, he built Ramapo Hall, Peace Hall, among other buildings in Miye ou Miye. During World War II, the Australian 7th Division, with British and Free French, supported by the Royal Australian Air Force, Royal Australian Navy, Royal Navy and Royal Air Force, fought for Miye ou Miye against Vichy French forces in 1941. The Free France Forces turned the orphanage into a prison when they defeated the Vichy French. In 1942-43, the Lebanese people strived for independence from the French control. The French authorities responded by arresting and imprisoning key Lebanese leaders at Ramapo hall. Lebanese Christian and Muslim leaders united their forces, supported by the international community and regional powers, to pressure the French government which resulted in releasing the prisoners on November 22, 1943 and recognizing Lebanon's full and complete independence. In 1948, Palestinian refugees settled at the outskirts of Miye ou Miye, occupying the land and the Palace(Ramapo Hall). Since then, the West of Miye ou Miye village became known as Mieh Mieh refugee camp. Also, below the hill of Miye ou Miye refugee camp another camp was created at that time and became known as Ain al-Hilweh Palestinian refugee camp.

== Bibliography ==
- Guérin, V. (1880). Description Géographique Historique et Archéologique de la Palestine (in French). Vol. 3: Galilee, pt. 2. Paris: L'Imprimerie Nationale.
