= Arsal =

Arsal Aarsal, Ersal 'Irsal
- Town and Municipality
- Location in Lebanon
- Coordinates: 34°10′46″N 36°25′15″E
- Country: Lebanon
- Governorate: Baalbek-Hermel
- District: Baalbek

Area
  - Total: 122.37 sq mi (316.94 km^{2})
- Elevation: 5,090 ft (1,550 m)

Population Estimate
  - Total: 50,000
- Time zone: EST+7

Ain Choaab
- Ain Chaub
- Interactive map of Ain Choaab
- Type: Rock shelter
- Cultures: Natufian
- Location: 3 km (1.9 mi) east of Labweh

Site notes
- Excavation dates: 1970, 1976
- Archaeologists: Bruce Schroeder
- Public access: Yes

Arsal (also spelled Aarsal, Ersal or 'Irsal; Arabic: عرسال), is a town and municipality situated east of Labweh, 124 kilometres (77 mi) northeast of Beirut, in Baalbek District of Baalbek-Hermel Governorate, Lebanon. The population is predominantly Sunni Muslim.

It is a traditional town situated on the slopes of the Anti-Lebanon mountains. It is known for its local hand-made carpet industry. The area is known to be one of the few places in the Anti-Lebanon with a good water supply. The Lebanese Ministry of Tourism brochure suggests that the name Arsal or Ersal means "God's Throne" in Aramaic. It documents several rock-cut benches (mastabas) in the village, numerous historical monuments in the nearby hills and an ancient fortified structure in the nearby Wadi Al-Toun of unknown date.

== Ain Choaab ==
Ain Choaab or Ain Chaub spring is located in the nearby hills, just of the main road from Arsal to Labweh. There are Natufian rock shelters situated 80 metres (260 ft) above the wadi bed of the spring that can be accessed via a steep climb up a ridge. Flint tools were collected from the site by Bruce Schroeder in 1970. The Ain Choaab archaeological site has not yet been excavated.

== History ==
In 1838, Eli Smith noted 'Arsal as a Metawileh village in the Baalbek area.

== Syrian Civil War ==
On 17 September 2012, Syrian ground-attack aircraft fired three missiles 500 metres (1,600 ft) over the border into Lebanese territory near Arsal. It was suggested that the jets were chasing rebels in the vicinity. The attack prompted Lebanese president Michel Sleiman to launch an investigation, whilst not publicly blaming Syria for the incident.

On 22 September 2012, a group of armed members of the Free Syrian Army attacked a border post near Arsal. This was reported to be the second incursion within a week. The group were chased off into the hills by the Lebanese Army, who detained and later released some rebels due to pressure from locals. Michel Sleiman praised the actions taken by the military as maintaining Lebanon's position being "neutral from the conflicts of others". He called on border residents to "stand beside their army and assist its members." Syria has repeatedly called for an intensified crackdown on rebels that it claims are hiding in Lebanese border towns.

One thousand four hundred refugee children from the Syrian civil war have been displaced into the town, where schools only have places for one hundred students. The situation reflects a growing crisis threatening to overwhelm the Beqaa educational system.

On 2 February 2013, the Lebanese army was the victim of an armed ambush in the town as it was seeking to arrest Khaled Homayed. Two army officers were killed and a number of soldiers were wounded. Homayed is believed to have been involved with the Fatah al-Islam organization that was responsible for many deadly attacks on the Lebanese army as well as the kidnapping of seven Estonians in 2011. He is also believed to be active with the Free Syrian Army. Town residents refused to cooperate with the army to reveal the whereabouts of the gunmen who were responsible for the ambush.

In August 2014, ISIS and its allies launched a full-scale invasion and the battle with Lebanese troops went on for five days before they were forced back into Syria.

In January 2016 a local newspaper reported that there were 10,000 Syrian refugees in Arsal itself with a further 100,000 in dozens of camps around the town. A second report estimated that Arsal was host to 50,000 refugees.

On 21 July 2017, a Syrian Army commander stated that his forces and Hezbollah had launched a joint campaign to recapture the remaining territory under militant control near the Lebanon-Syria border, attacking the outskirts of Arsal. The Lebanese Army meanwhile assumed a defensive position in Arsal.

== Situation of Refugees in Arsal ==
In 2019, the Lebanese central government decided to demolish the refuges' huts built of hollow blocks over the war years on the grounds of missing building permits. According to the UNHCR, the resolution affects about 2,300 shelters in 17 camps around Arsal and up to 15,000 people, of whom about half are children.

Ref* Conference Institute for the Study of Religious Communities (G.H.Tardy, MA, expert Sherp.) -"Refugees in Lebanon and Destruction of Regional Geopolitical Diversity, 2019". In sup. "L'Intégrité du Liban en danger), Beirut, 2018.

Since the use of bulldozers in the demolition took no account of the interior facilities and the destruction of mattresses, kitchen appliances, furniture, water tanks was accepted, the humanitarian situation in Arsal has deteriorated dramatically. From now on, according to the government, only tents are still allowed for Syrian residents.

== Demographics ==
In 2014 Muslims made up 99.69% of registered voters in Arsal. 98.86% of the voters were Sunni Muslims.

== Bibliography ==
- Robinson, E.; Smith, E. (1841). Biblical Researches in Palestine, Mount Sinai and Arabia Petraea: A Journal of Travels in the year 1838. Vol. 3. Boston: Crocker & Brewster.
