= Abdullah Shraidi =

Lebanese militant

Abdullah Shraidi (/əbˈdʌlə ˈʃreɪdi/ əb-DUL-ə SHRAY-dee) was the former leader of Osbat al-Nour whose near-fatal shooting on May 17, 2003, sparked violence between members of Osbat al-Nour and Fatah militia members in the Palestinian refugee camp of Ain al-Hilweh in southern Lebanon. The shooting took place after the funeral of family relative Ibrahim Shraidi, a Fatah member gunned down by an unknown assailant. The Shraidi's are a large clan in Ain al-Hilweh and members of the family can be found in opposing factions in the camp. The fighting that occurred left 8 dead and 25 wounded. Shraidi died two months later, in July, from wounds sustained during the shooting after Fatah had agreed to a cease fire.
