= Osbat al-Nour =

Osbat al-Nour (Arabic: عُصْبَة ٱلنُّور, romanized: ʕuṣba(t) an-nūr 'Band of Light') is an armed Islamist group that professes allegiance to a Salafist interpretation of Islam.

== Ain al-Hilweh 2003 ==
In May 2003, fighting broke out between members of Osbat al-Nour and Fatah militia members in the south Lebanon Palestinian refugee camp of Ain al-Hilweh as part of an ongoing series of battles for control of the Palestinian refugee camp.

A serious clash took place on 17 May, after the near-fatal shooting of Osbat al-Nour leader Abdullah Shraidi, in which one of Abdullah's bodyguards and a bystander were killed. The shooting occurred while they were returning from the funeral of Ibrahim Shraidi, a family relative though a member of Fatah, who had been gunned down by an unknown assailant. About 200 Osbat al-Nour fundamentalist fighters attacked Fatah offices at Ain al-Hilweh. Eight people were killed (included six members of Yasser Arafat's Fatah movement) and 25 wounded in the fighting. Schools in the Ain al-Hilweh camp were shut and most stores kept their shutters down at the height of the fighting, which provoked an exodus by hundreds of camp residents. Two months after the ambush Abdullah Shraidi died from wounds received during the attack. Fatah agreed to a ceasefire after failing to defeat Osbat al-Nour in the camp.

== Links with al-Qaeda ==
Osbat al-Nour is said to be an offshoot of the larger Osbat al-Ansar, which is on the United States list of terrorist groups because of its alleged links to Osama bin Laden's al-Qaeda.
