= Jund al-Sham =

Name of militant groups

Jund al-Sham (Arabic: جند الشام, lit. 'Soldiers of the Levant') is or was the collective name of multiple separate Sunni Islamist jihadist militant groups, that originally operated as sister organizations and as a predecessor to the Islamic State.

Founded around 1991 by Abu Musab al-Zarqawi in Jordan and trained in 1999 in Afghanistan with financial support from Osama bin Laden, the group has perpetrated several terrorist attacks since 2004 in countries such as Lebanon and Qatar. A second group has also fought the Syrian army in Syria from 2005 until March 2014.

== Jordan, Afghanistan, ca. 1991–1999 ==
This group, established by Syrians, Palestinians and Jordanians linked to al-Zarqawi, is believed to have first "emerged" in Afghanistan in 1999.
According to European Intelligence documents and Jordanian government sources, al-Zarqawi set up the Jund al-Sham's al-Matar Training Camp in 1999 in Afghanistan, near Herat, with $200,000 in startup money he received from Osama bin Laden.
The camp taught the militants techniques in guerrilla warfare, explosives and chemical weapons.

It is believed the group left Herat after its base of operations was disrupted by the October 2001 War in Afghanistan.

== 2004 Lebanon ==
One of the Jund al-Sham groups, consisting of Palestinian militants, was based in the Ain al-Hilweh refugee camp for Palestinian refugees, near the southern port city of Sidon (also known as Saida), in South Lebanon.
The Washington Post in 2006 suggested that this Lebanese Jund group was not connected with the Jund al-Sham group in 1999 in Afghanistan, but produced no arguments for that thesis.

This Lebanon-based group was an anti-Fatah organization formed in 2004 and was considered a splinter group of Osbat al-Nour (in Arabic عصبة النور) led by Abdullah Shraidi.

== 2005 Lebanon/Syria/Qatar ==
On March 19, 2005 Jund Ash Sham killed one British teacher outside of Doha Players theater in Doha in Qatar, and injured 12 other people. The group that month claimed for the suicide bombing in Qatar.

In July 2005, Jund Ash Sham faxed a threat to assassinate several prominent Hezbollah allies and leaders, including former spiritual leader of the movement Sayyed Mohammad Hussein Fadlallah, at the Shiite Fatwa Center in Lebanese Tyre.

Amnesty International reported on a September 2005 clash of Syrian Army against Jund al-Sham near Hama:

Heba al-Khaled, Rola al-Khaled and Nadia al-Satour were arrested on 3 September 2005, following, according to Syrian state media, a gun battle in Hama province, in the west of the country, between the Anti-Terror Squad and militants of the Jund al-Sham ("Soldiers of the Levant") armed group. Five Jund al-Sham members were reportedly killed and two security officers injured. The women were arrested when the security forces were unable to find their husbands, who are allegedly involved with Jund al-Sham. They were first detained in the town of Hama, before being transferred to the Military Intelligence Palestine Branch in Damascus. They were reportedly held as hostages to put pressure on their husbands to give themselves up, even though Heba al-Khaled and her sister Rola al-Khaled were pregnant at the time they were detained, and Nadia al-Satour reportedly had her young baby with her.

According to a pro-Syrian government blog, saroujah.blogspot.com critical of Palestinians being armed in their camps, in October 2005, Jund fought with a Nasserist group outside the Ain al-Hilweh camp in Lebanon, four people were injured. Also in October 2005, Jund al-Sham threatened to slaughter the German prosecutor Detlev Mehlis, who was heading the UN inquiry into the assassination of Lebanese business magnate and former Prime Minister Rafik Hariri. It claimed that Mehlis was connected with Israel.

== 2006–2007 Lebanon/Syria ==
On May Day, 2006, Jund al-Sham clashed with Fatah in the Ain al-Hilweh refugee camp for Palestinian refugees in Lebanon. One Palestinian bystander, Mohammed Tayssir Awad, 20, was killed by a stray bullet. The Associated Press reported that the fighting began when Jund al-Sham gunmen tried to assassinate Mahmoud Abdul-Hamid Issa, a Fatah military official, as he walked with his bodyguards. One of the bodyguards, Abu Omra al-Aswad, was seriously wounded.

On June 2, 2006 the Russian Supreme Court banned Jund al-Sham along with the Palestinian Islamic Jihad group.

On September 12, 2006, armed militants reportedly linked to Jund al-Sham attempted to storm the US Embassy in Damascus. The four attackers were armed with hand grenades and automatic rifles, as well as a van rigged with explosives. Three of the attackers were killed and one wounded; a Syrian anti-terrorism officer was also killed in the battle.

On June 3, 2007, Jund al-Sham fired a rocket-propelled grenade at a Lebanese Army checkpoint near Sidon (Saida), prompting a response from the Lebanese Army leading to clashes. These clashes followed a tense three weeks in Lebanon's north, where the Lebanese Army has been battling another militant group Fatah al-Islam at a Palestinian refugee camp.

== 2012–2014 Syria ==
Lebanese Khaled Mahmoud al-Dandashi, also known as Abu Suleiman, had been in prison in Lebanon from 2000 to 2005 for being part of "Abou Aisha" forces fighting the Lebanese Army in Jroud el Dennieh in North Lebanon. After his release, he became part of Fatah al-Islam and was arrested and imprisoned for involvement bombing against a Lebanese Army convoy and spent 6 more years in prison from 2006 to 2012. In early 2012, Dandashi was either released from prison after serving his sentence, or escaped prison.

Al-Dandashi traveled to Qalaat al-Hosn, a village in Syria near Homs, at the foot of Crusader castle Krak des Chevaliers, where he announced early 2012 in a video his launching of a Syria branch of Jund al-Sham, declaring himself the group's emir, and saying his mission was "jihad to enable God's rule on earth". This Jund branch was composed of Lebanese Sunni fighters from Tripoli and north Lebanon and some Libyans, and it fought alongside the al-Nusra Front.

Following the June 2013 clashes in Sidon between followers of militant cleric Ahmed al-Assir and the Lebanese Army, Jund al-Sham allegedly provided protection and refuge to the Lebanese former artist Fadl Shaker in "Tawaare' Taameer Ail el Helweh" region.

In August 2013, two members of Jund al-Sham from Lebanese Tripoli were killed in a suicide bombing near a Syrian Army checkpoint in Homs District. Seventeen Lebanese fighters from Tripoli were killed in a Syrian Army ambush in Syria on their way to join Al-Mahmoud's forces. Jund al-Sham has been accused of organizing massacres of tens of Syrian Christians in the predominantly Christian Wadi al-Nasara in Homs district in August 2013.

In March 2014, over 300 Jund fighters, probably with their families together numbering 1,000 people, were holed up in Crusader castle Krak des Chevaliers, near Homs. Syrian government troops seized the castle, killing at least ten of the Jund al-Sham, including their leader Khaled Mahmoud al-Dandashi. 300 surviving Jund al-Sham fighters, with their families together numbering 1,000 people, then retreated to Lebanon.

== See also ==
- Bilad al-Sham
- Jund
- List of armed groups in the Syrian Civil War
