= Osbat al-Ansar =

Sunni fundamentalist organization

League of the Partisans عصبة الأنصار Osbat al-Ansar
- Leaders: Hisham Shreidi (1986–1991); Ahmed Abd al-Karim al-Saadi (1991–1999); Abu Tarek al-Saadi (1999–2023)
- Dates active: 1994–present
- Active regions: Lebanon
- Ideology: Salafi Islamism; Jihadism; Sunni Islamism
- Status: Designated as a terrorist group by Australia, Bahrain, Kazakhstan, Russia, the United Arab Emirates, the United States, the United Kingdom and the United Nations

Osbat al-Ansar or Asbat al-Ansar (Arabic: عصبة الأنصار, romanized: ʿUṣbat al-ʾAnṣār, "League of the Partisans") is a Sunni Islamist fundamentalist group established in the early 1990s, with a primary base of operations in the Palestinian camp of Ain al-Hilweh refugee camp near Sidon, which claims professing the Salafi form of Islam and the overthrow of the Lebanese-dominated secular government.

It has been designated as a terrorist group by the Bahrain, United Nations, Canada, Kazakhstan, Russia, the UAE, the United Kingdom and the United States. It is on the United States' list of terrorist organizations for alleged connections with Osama bin Laden's al-Qaeda, and the American administration decided to freeze all assets of Osbat al-Ansar following the attacks on September 11th, 2001. The group has reportedly received funding from Abu Musab al-Zarqawi.

Osbat al-Ansar is also connected with fundamentalist groups Osbat al-Nour, Jund Ash Sham, the Dinniyeh Group and Takfir wal Hijra. Ahmed Abd al-Karim al-Saadi is the ostensible leader of the group; however, since he went into hiding in 1999, the group has been led by his brother Abu Tarek al-Saadi. Osbat al-Ansar is estimated to have less than 2000 members, mostly Lebanese, with a primary base of operations in the Ain al-Hilwah refugee camp near Sidon in southern Lebanon.

== Ideology ==
According to the Australian Government and the Canadian Government the goal of Osbat al-Ansar is "the establishment of a radical Islamic state in Lebanon." as well as "Overthrowing the Lebanese government and preventing what they perceive as anti-Sunni Islamic influences in Lebanon".

The group professes the Salafi form of Islam.

== Support ==
According to Seymour Hersh, Osbat el-Ansar has received arms and supplies from Lebanese internal-security forces and militias associated with the Siniora government.

== Activities ==
Asbat al-Ansar first emerged in the early 1990s. In the mid-1990s, the group assassinated Lebanese religious leaders and bombed nightclubs, theaters, and liquor stores. One of those assassinated was Nizar al-Halabi - leader of the Sufi Al-Ahbash - on 31 August 1995. The group has also plotted against foreign diplomatic targets. In January 2000, it launched a rocket-propelled grenade attack against the Russian Embassy. In October 2004, Mahir al-Sa’di, a member of Asbat al-Ansar, was sentenced in absentia to life imprisonment for his 2000 plot to assassinate then-U.S. Ambassador to Lebanon David Satterfield. Asbat al-Ansar has no formal ties to the AQ network, but the group shares AQ's ideology and has publicly proclaimed its support for al-Qa’ida in Iraq. Members of the group have traveled to Iraq since 2005 to fight Coalition Forces. Asbat al-Ansar has been reluctant to involve itself in operations in Lebanon due in part to concerns over losing its safe haven in the Ain al-Hilwah refugee camp. AAA did not stage any known attacks in 2012.

== Other actions by Osbat al-Ansar ==
In 2002, a representative of Osbat al-Ansar handed over Badieh Hamadeh, a Shiite living in Ain al-Hilweh suspected of killing three Lebanese soldiers, to Lebanese authorities. A spokesman for Osbat al-Ansar stated that the decision to make the hand over was to "spare the camp any bloodshed".

== Prevented attacks ==
In 2001, Daniel Ahmad Samarji, and Bilal Ali Othman, were arrested in the northern city of Tripoli for planning terrorist acts, illegal dealing in weapons of war and discharging firearms.
