= Ain al-Hilweh =

Ain al-Hilweh عين الحلوة
- Refugee camp
- Location within Lebanon
- Coordinates: 33°32′37″N 35°22′41″E
- Country: Lebanon
- Governorate: South Governorate
- District: Sidon District

Area
  - Total: 0.3 km^{2} (0.12 sq mi)

Population
  - Estimate (2003): 120,000
- Time zone: UTC+2 (EET)

Ain al-Hilweh (Arabic: عين الحلوة, lit. meaning "sweet natural spring"), also spelled as Ayn al-Hilweh and Ein El Hilweh, is the largest Palestinian refugee camp in Lebanon. It had a population of over 70,000 Palestinian refugees but swelled to nearly 120,000, as a result of influx of refugees from Syria since 2011. The camp is located west of the village Miye ou Miye and the Mieh Mieh refugee camp, southeast of the port city of Sidon and north of Darb Es Sim.

Ain al-Hilweh was established near the city of Sidon in 1948 by the International Committee of the Red Cross to accommodate refugees from Amqa, Saffuriya, Sha'ab, Taitaba, Manshieh, al-Simireh, al-Nahr, Safsaf, Hittin, al-Ras al-Ahmar, al-Tira and Tarshiha in northern Palestine. Ain Al-Hilweh is located on land owned by landowners from Miye ou Miye, Darb Es Sim and Sidon. Because Lebanese Armed Forces are not allowed to enter the camp, Ain al-Hilweh has been called a "zone of unlaw" by the Lebanese media. Many people wanted by the Lebanese government are believed to have taken refuge in the camp as a result of the lack of Lebanese authority.

== Etymology ==
The direct translation of Ain al-Hilweh is "sweet water spring". People believe that the camp was named after a natural water spring that existed in the present-day Ain al-Hilweh refugee camp. In actuality, the Ain al-Hilweh spring was located at the corner of the valley between Miye ou Miye village and Darb es Seem. The water flowed from the spring westward 500 meters towards a manmade dam. The dam was erected at the crossroad between Mieh Mieh and present day Seyroub neighborhood in Darb es Seem. The Palestinian camp is located between 1000 m to 1500 m to the west, away from the natural spring.

Emir Fakhr-al-Din II, (Fakhr-al-Din Ibn Mann, Fakhr-al-Din al Maani), was given the title "emir" or "prince" in Arabic because the Maan dynasty reigned over Lebanon at that time. Lebanon was divided into several emirates (the state or jurisdiction of an emir). So, there was an emirate out of several called, “Emirate of Ain al-Hilweh” and had an emir. The emirate stretched northwest from the Ain al-Hilweh spring, looped around the bottom of Mieh Mieh village along present-day Officers’ Military Club straight north to the Barghout Creek (between Mieh Mieh and Haret Saida) and west to the Mediterranean Sea. From the south, the emirate stretched straight west to the Mediterranean Sea. So the present-day Palestinian refugee camp got its name from the Emirate Ain al-Hilweh.

== History ==
=== Establishment ===
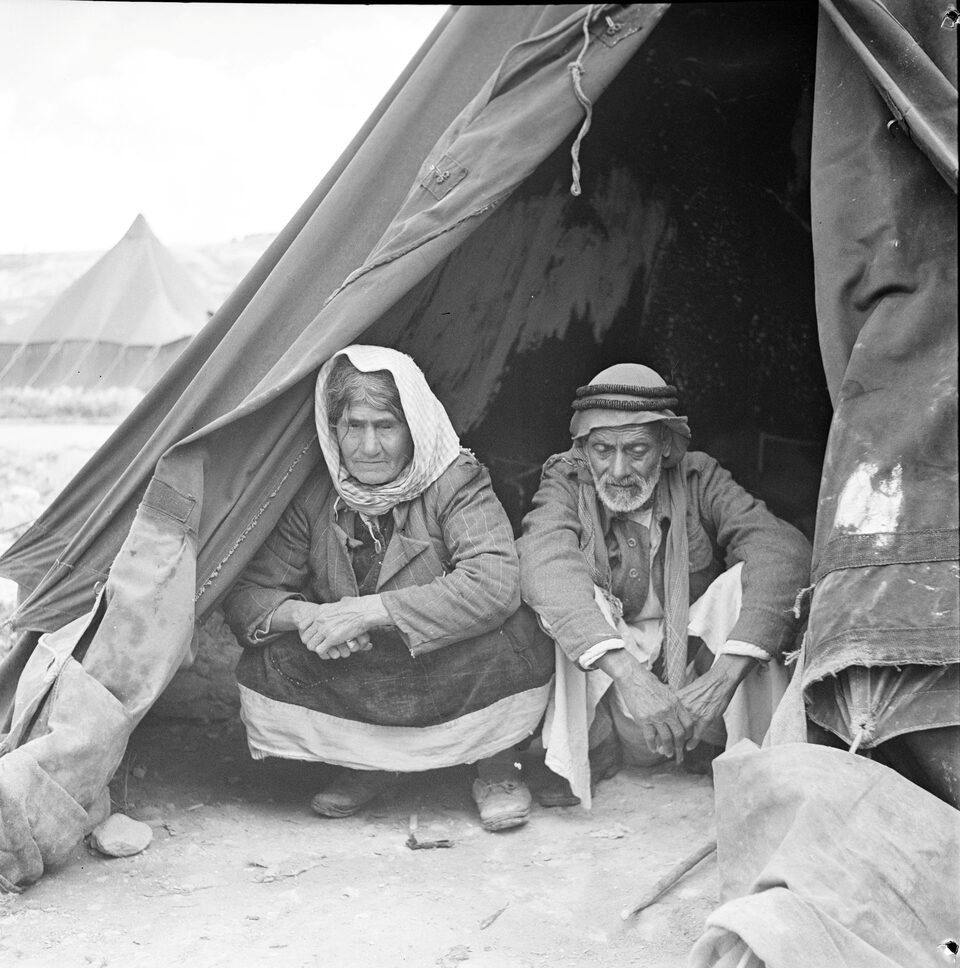
Palestinian refugees in Ein El Hilweh, c.1948

The camp was established in 1948 to accommodate Palestinian refugees displaced by the 1948 Palestinian expulsion and flight which occurred during the 1948 Palestine war. The Ain al-Hilweh Palestinian camp is spread out on private properties owned by villagers from Miye ou Miye, Darb es Sim and Sidon. The size of the Ain al-Hilweh camp in the early 1990s was around 290 dunams (72 acres). Today, the size of the camp increased by 2.35 times to 686 dunams (170 acres). The proportion of the land of Ain al-Hilwe camp located in the above towns is as follows: Miye ou Miye (22%), Darb Es Sim (4%) and Sidon (74%).

=== 1974 attack ===
On 20 June 1974, the Israeli Air Force (IAF) attacked the camp, killing 11 people and injuring 32, according to the Lebanese Army.

=== 1982 Lebanon war ===
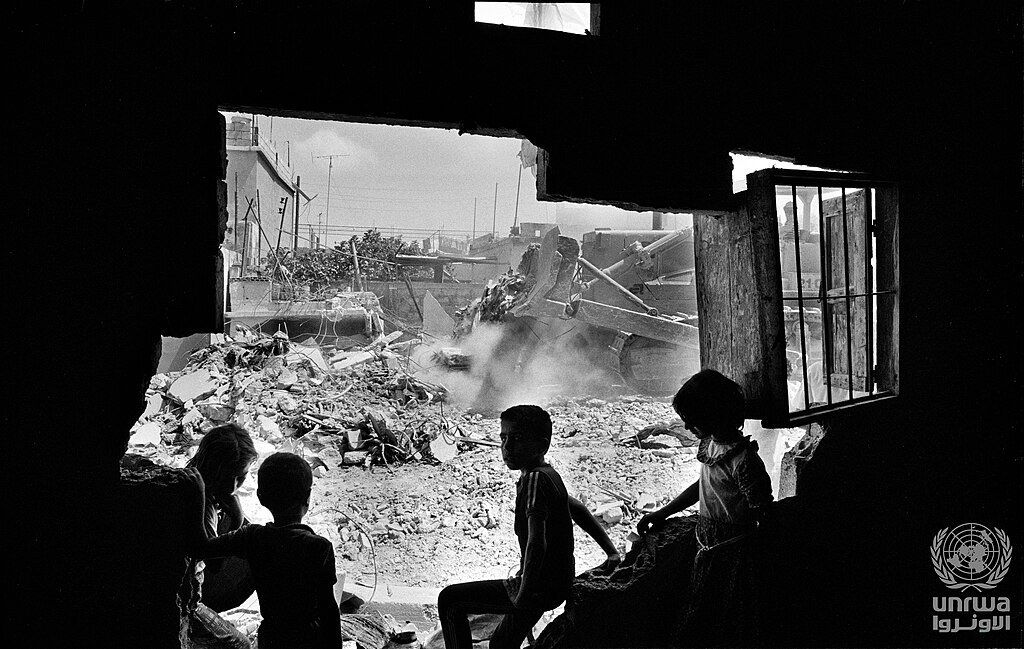
Children watch as an Israeli bulldozer pushes over the remaining wall of a destroyed shelter in the camp, 1982

During the Israeli invasion of Lebanon in 1982, the Israel Defense Forces (IDF) landed north of Sidon and the city was subjected to a heavy aerial bombing, causing heavy casualties among the civilian population. Dov Yermiya was to later liken the bombardment used on the refugee camp of Ain al-Hilweh as of an intensity which recalled the quantity of bombs used in World War 2 and described the destruction as 100%. There was prolonged fighting in Ain al-Hilweh, culminating with the Palestinian defenders making a last stand at a mosque which was thereupon blown up by the IDF. Israeli historian Gil'ad Be'eri gives the following account

(...) The Refugee camps were heavily fortified, full of bunkers and fire positions. The Palestinian defence at Ein El Hilweh and other refugee camps was based on hand-carried anti-tank weapons such as the RPG (Rocket propelled grenade). (...) The IDF was not prepared for this kind of fighting, having at hand mainly armoured forces intended for use in open areas. The built-up area inhibited long-range weapons, created an equality between the tank and the RPG (often wielded by 13- or 14-year-old boys), and increased the number of Israeli casualties. (...) Palestinian resistance seriously disrupted the timetable of the planned rapid advance to Beirut. It took eight days before the final crushing of resistance in Ein El Hilweh. The method adopted by the army was to use loud-speakers to call upon the civilian population to move away, search the houses one by one, surround points of remaining active resistance and subdue them by overwhelming fire.

=== Aftermath of Israeli withdrawal ===
Following the Israeli retreat from Beirut in 1985 Ain al-Hilweh was outside the Israeli security zone.

During the War of the Camps Ain al-Hilweh received over 8,000 Palestinians fleeing Amal gunmen and the siege of Rashidieh Camp in Tyre. Amal had little political support in Sidon. On 24 November 1986 a coalition of fighters from all of the main factions in the camp launched an offensive against Amal positions in the strategic village of Maghdouché overlooking Sidon. After a week of fighting they gained control of most of the village.

Israeli Air Force airstrikes, 6 & 8 May 1987, on a residential area of Ain al-Hilweh killed fifteen people, wounded fifty and destroyed twenty houses. Four months later, 6 September, another air raid on a militants headquarters in Ain al-Hilweh killed fifty-six people and wounded one hundred and ninety. According to UNRWA nine women were amongst the dead and twenty-one of the injured were women and children.

On 2 January 1988 night-time Israeli airstrikes on PFLP-GC positions in Ain al-Hilweh and PSP positions along the coast North of Sidon killed around twenty people, including seven children and one woman. Three members of PFLP-GC and three from PSP were also amongst those killed. It was reported that the raids were retaliation for the 25 November 1987 PFLP-GC hang-glider attack in which six IDF soldiers were killed. In the previous two years there had been about forty Israeli air strikes on Lebanon.

=== Fatah takeover of 1990 ===
In the 1980s, most Palestinian refugee camps in Lebanon were dominated by Syrian-backed Palestinian groups. In the late 1980s, members of Yasser Arafat's Fatah movement, after being ousted in other refugee camps moved on to Ain al-Hilweh. On 7 September 1990, after a three-day conflict with the Abu Nidal Organization, Fatah members were able to establish dominance in Ain al-Hilweh. Sixty-eight people were killed in the fighting and around 300 wounded. It left Fatah in control of an area from the eastern suburbs of Sidon to Iqlim al-Kharrub.

On 4 July 1991, following the failure of disarmament negotiations, as required by the Taif agreement, the Lebanese Army attacked Palestinian positions in Southern Lebanon. The offensive, involving 10,000 troops against an estimated 5,000 militia, lasted 3 days and ended with the Army taking all the Palestinian positions around Sidon. In the agreement that followed all heavy weapons were surrendered and infantry weapons only allowed in the two refugee camps, Ain al-Hilweh and Mieh Mieh. 73 people were killed in the fighting, and 200 wounded, mostly Palestinian.

By 1993, another group led by Fatah's top military commander in the camp, Col. Mounir Maqdahhad known as the Black September 13 Brigade, with support from Hezbollah and Iran, gained dominance over mainstream Fatah members in the camp. On 25 November 1994 fighting broke out which left ten people dead and resulted in the Fatah loyalists being expelled from the camp. At the time the camp had a population of around 70,000. The following June there was a further two days of fighting between Fatah factions in which ten people were killed and about thirty wounded. Maqdahhad's dominance was short-lived as he rejoined Fatah in 1998 after the Palestinian Authority began funding the camp again. In 1999 a Lebanese court convicted the leader of Fatah in Lebanon, Sultan Abu al-Aynayn, of "forming an armed gang" and sentenced him in absentia to death.

=== 2003 Fatah and Osbat al-Nour conflict ===
In May 2003, fighting broke out between members of Osbat al-Nour and Fatah militia members in Ain al-Hilweh after the near-fatal shooting of Osbat al-Nour leader Abdullah Shraidi on 17 May, in which one of Abdullah's bodyguards and a bystander were killed. The shooting occurred while returning from the funeral of a Fatah member and family relative, Ibrahim Shraidi who was gunned down by an unknown assailant. Roughly 200 Osbat al-Nour fundamentalist fighters attacked Fatah offices. Eight people were killed and 25 wounded in the fighting at Ain al-Hilweh. Schools in Ain al-Hilweh were shut and most stores kept their shutters down at the height of the fighting, which provoked an exodus by hundreds of camp residents. Fatah agreed to a ceasefire after failing to defeat the fundamentalists in the camp. Two months after the ambush Abdullah Shraidi died from wounds received during the attack.

=== 2005 arrests ===
In July 2005 four members of the Islamic Liberation Party were arrested. The Lebanese authorities claimed that the group had connections with Syria and that the group has participated in terrorist attacks in various Arab countries. Palestinian sources described the moves as a step toward the disarmament of their factions, in line with United Nations Security Council Resolution 1559.

=== Clashes during the 2007 Lebanon conflict ===
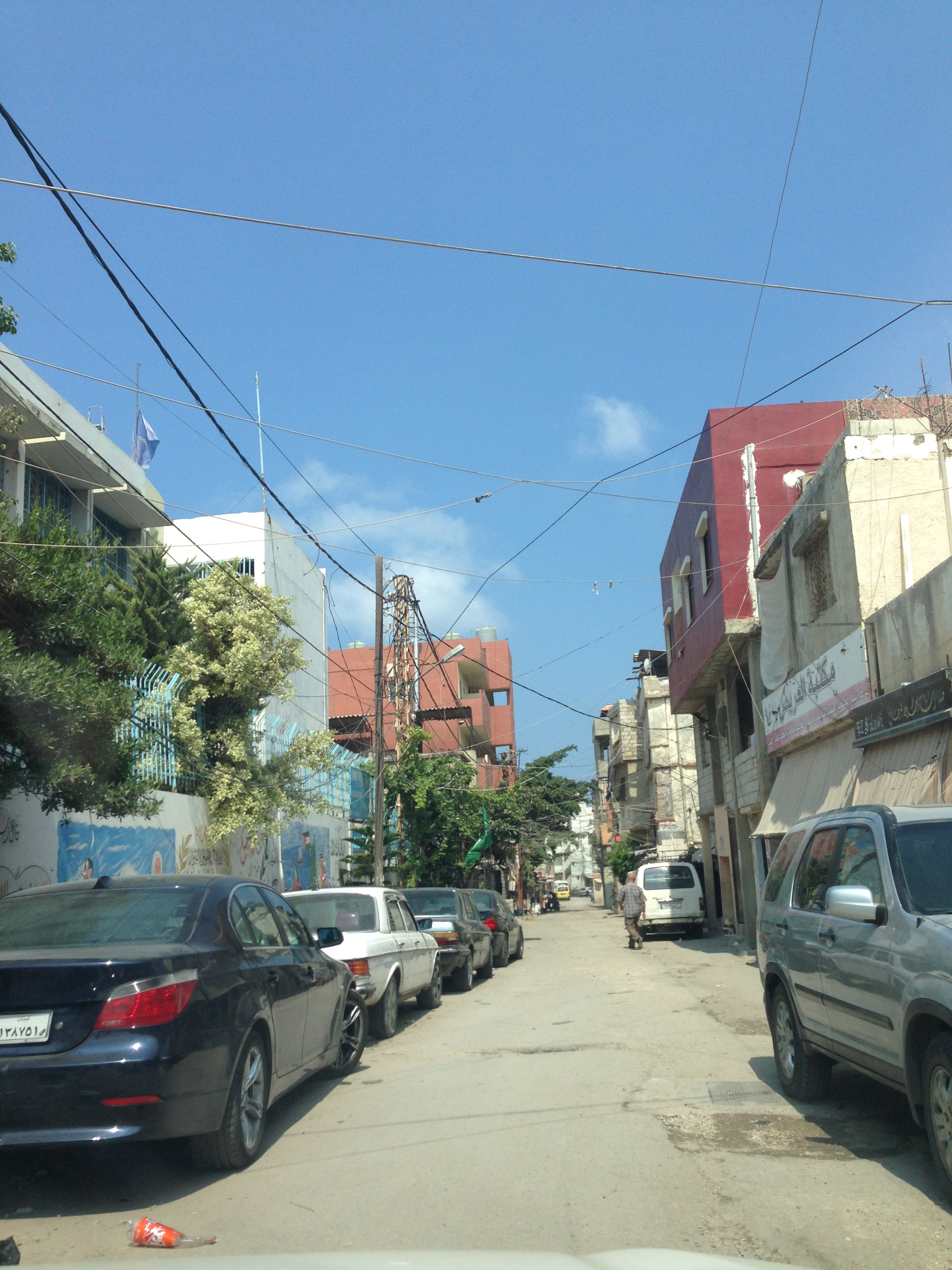
A street in Ain al-Hilweh, 2014

On 3 June 2007, Jund al-Sham fired a rocket-propelled grenade at a Lebanese Army checkpoint near Sidon, prompting a response from the Lebanese Army leading to clashes in the camp. These clashes follow a tense three weeks in Lebanon's north, where the Lebanese Army has been battling militant group Fatah al-Islam at the Palestinian refugee camp Nahr al-Bared.

=== 2008 clashes ===
In March 2008, fighting broke out between members of the Fatah faction and the Islamist group Jund al-Sham.

=== Influx of refugees from Syria ===
The conditions in the camp have been exacerbated by an influx of previously Syrian-based Palestinian refugees, as a result of the Syrian Civil War. As a result of this influx, the camp's population has swelled from 70,000 to as much as 120,000.

As of 2014, the camp suspected of being a popular destination for jihadist rebels fleeing neighbouring Syria, particularly after the Syrian Army, backed by the Shia Lebanese militia Hezbollah, regained control of Yabroud from the rebels in March 2014.

=== Walling of camp ===
In 2016 Lebanese authorities began constructing a concrete wall with watch towers around the camp. The wall has faced some criticism, being called "racist" by some and supposedly labeling residents as terrorists or islamists. As of May 2017 the wall construction is nearly complete.

=== 2023 clashes ===
On July 30, 2023, fighting broke out inside the camp when gunmen tried to assassinate Islamist militant Mahmoud Khalil, killing a companion of his instead. Later, Islamist militants ambushed a Fatah military general in a parking lot, killing him and three bodyguards. Fighting continued the next day, with six more people being killed, bringing the death toll to eleven. More than 40 people were injured. A ceasefire was announced later in the day. More than 2,000 people left the camp amid the fighting.

== Notable residents ==
- Naji al-Ali, cartoonist who moved to Ain al-Hilweh with his family after the 1948 Palestinian expulsion and flight
- Hajj Radwan

== See also ==
- Nabatieh camp, destroyed between the years 1982–1991 and most of the population moved to Ain al-Hilweh
- A World Not Ours, a documentary film about life in Ain al-Hilweh, broadcast as part of the P.O.V. series
