= History of Sidon =

History of ancient city

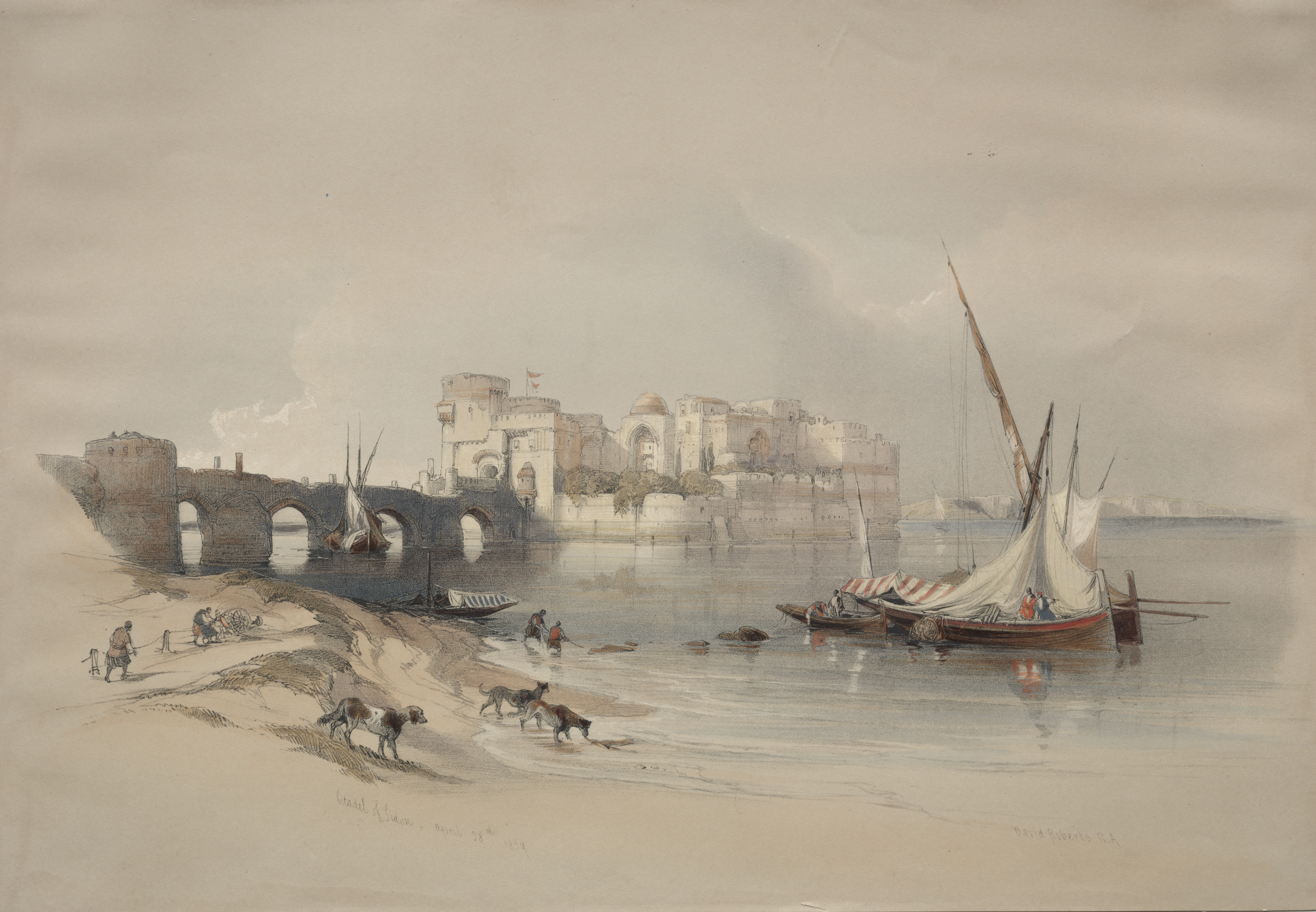
The port town of Sidon (pictured in 1843), capital of the Sidon-Beirut Sanjak, which Fakhr al-Din and his family governed between 1593 and 1633 with occasional interruption

Sidon is one of the oldest inhabited cities in the world and has a rich and diverse history that spans over 6,000 years. The city's name has changed over time and has been known by various names, including Sidun, Saida, and Saïd. The earliest evidence of human settlement in the area dates back to the Neolithic period, around 4000 BCE. Sidon rose to prominence during the Bronze Age and became one of the most important city-states in the region. It was a major center for trade and commerce and played a significant role in the Mediterranean trade network. The city's strategic coastal location made it a hub for maritime activities.

In the years before Christianity, Sidon had many conquerors: Assyrians, Babylonians, Egyptians, Persians, Greeks, and finally Romans. Herod the Great visited Sidon. Both Jesus and Saint Paul are said to have visited it, too. The city was eventually conquered by the Arabs and then by the Ottoman Turks.

== Prehistory ==
Sidon has been inhabited since very early in prehistory. The archaeological site of Sidon II shows a lithic assemblage dating to the Acheulean, whilst finds at Sidon III include a Heavy Neolithic assemblage suggested to date just prior to the invention of pottery.

== Late Bronze ==
The area was first recorded in history around 4000 BC as a group of coastal cities and a heavily forested hinterland. It was inhabited by the Canaanites, a Semitic people, whom the Greeks called "Phoenicians" because of the purple (phoinikies) dye they sold. These early inhabitants referred to themselves as "men of Sidon" or the like, according to their city of origin. The Canaanites were city-state settlers, who established colonies throughout the Mediterranean (see: List of Phoenician cities) into a form of a Thalassocracy as opposed to an established empire with a designated capital city.

Each of the coastal cities was an independent city-state noted for the special activities of its inhabitants. Tyre and Sidon were important maritime and trade centers; Gubla (later known as Byblos; in Arabic, Jbeil) and Berytus (present-day Beirut) were trade and religious centers. Gubla was the first Canaanite city to trade actively with Egypt and the pharaohs of the Old Kingdom (2686-2181 BC), exporting cedar, olive oil, and wine, while importing gold and other products from the Nile Valley.

Around 1350 BC, Sidon was part of the Egyptian Empire and ruled by Zimredda of Sidon. During the Amarna Period, Egypt went into decline, leading to uprising and turmoil in the Levant. There was rivalry between Lebanese coastal city-states fighting for dominance, with Abimilku of Tyre in the south, and Rib-Hadda of Byblos in the north. Byblos became significantly weakened as the dominant city on the Lebanese coast. Further north, the Akkar Plain rebelled and became the kingdom of Amurru with Hittite support. The Mitanni Empire, an ally of the Egyptians, had dominated Syria but now fell apart due to the military campaigns of Suppiluliuma I of Hatti. Tutankhamun and his general Horemheb scrambled to keep Egyptian control over southern Levant, as the Hittites became overlords in the north.

In the Middle Bronze IIA, the Beqa Valley was a high way for trade between the Kingdom of Qatna in the north and Kingdom of Hazor in the south. Hazor may have been subject to Qatna, meaning that the entire region was under influence of Qatna, with Kadesh facing the northern part of the valley. Trade routes went further to Mari on the Euphrates river. In the valley, Kamid el-Loz had a palace and temple, being a hub for trade routes going north-south and east-west. There were trade routes to Beirut, Sidon, Hazor, Damascus, Tell Hizzin and Baalbek.

The oldest testimony documenting words in the Phoenician language of Sidon, is probably from the Late Bronze age. The Book of Deuteronomy (3, 9) reads: "the Sidonians call - Hermon - Sirion". In other words: Mount Hermon was called "Sirion", in (the Phoenician language of) Sidon.

== Iron Age ==
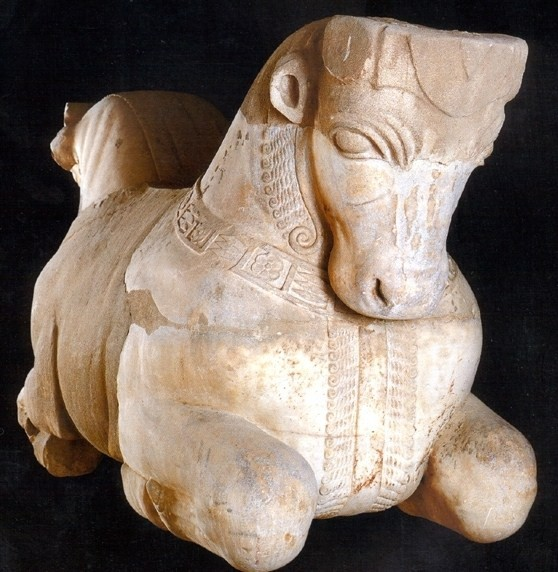
Persian style bull protome found in Sidon gives testimony of the Achaemenid rule and influence. Marble, 5th century BC

Sidon was one of the most important Phoenician cities, and it may have been the oldest. From there and other ports, a great Mediterranean commercial empire was founded. Homer praised the skill of its craftsmen in producing glass, purple dyes, and its women's skill at the art of embroidery. It was also from here that a colonizing party went to found the city of Tyre. Tyre also grew into a great city, and in subsequent years there was competition between the two, each claiming to be the metropolis ('Mother City') of Phoenicia.

Glass manufacturing, Sidon's most important enterprise in the Phoenician era, was conducted on a vast scale, and the production of purple dye was almost as important. The small shell of the Murex trunculus was broken in order to extract the pigment that was so rare it became the mark of royalty.

In AD 1855, the sarcophagus of King Eshmun’azar II was discovered. From a Phoenician inscription on its lid, it appears that he was a "king of the Sidonians", probably in the 5th century BC, and that his mother was a priestess of ‘Ashtart, "the goddess of the Sidonians". In this inscription the gods Eshmun and Ba‘al Sidon 'Lord of Sidon' (who may or may not be the same) are mentioned as chief gods of the Sidonians. ‘Ashtart is entitled ‘Ashtart-Shem-Ba‘al, '‘Ashtart the name of the Lord', a title also found in an Ugaritic text.Nebuchadnezzar II subjugated the city to be part of the Neo-Babylonian Empire.

=== Under the Assyrians and Babylonians ===
Tyre, Byblos, and Sidon all rebelled against Assyrian rule. In 721 BC, Sargon II besieged Tyre and crushed the rebellion. His successor Sennacherib suppressed further rebellions across the region. During the seventh century BC, Sidon rebelled and was destroyed by Esarhaddon, who enslaved its inhabitants and built a new city on its ruins. By the end of the century, the Assyrians had been weakened by successive revolts, which led to their destruction by the Median Empire. The Babylonians, formerly vassals of the Assyrians, took advantage of the empire's collapse and rebelled, quickly establishing the Neo-Babylonian Empire in its place. Phoenician cities revolted several times throughout the reigns of the first Babylonian King, Nabopolassar (626–605 BC), and his son Nebuchadnezzar II (c. 605–c. 562 BC). In 587 BC Nebuchadnezzar besieged Tyre, which resisted for thirteen years, but ultimately capitulated under "favorable terms".

== Persian and Hellenistic period ==
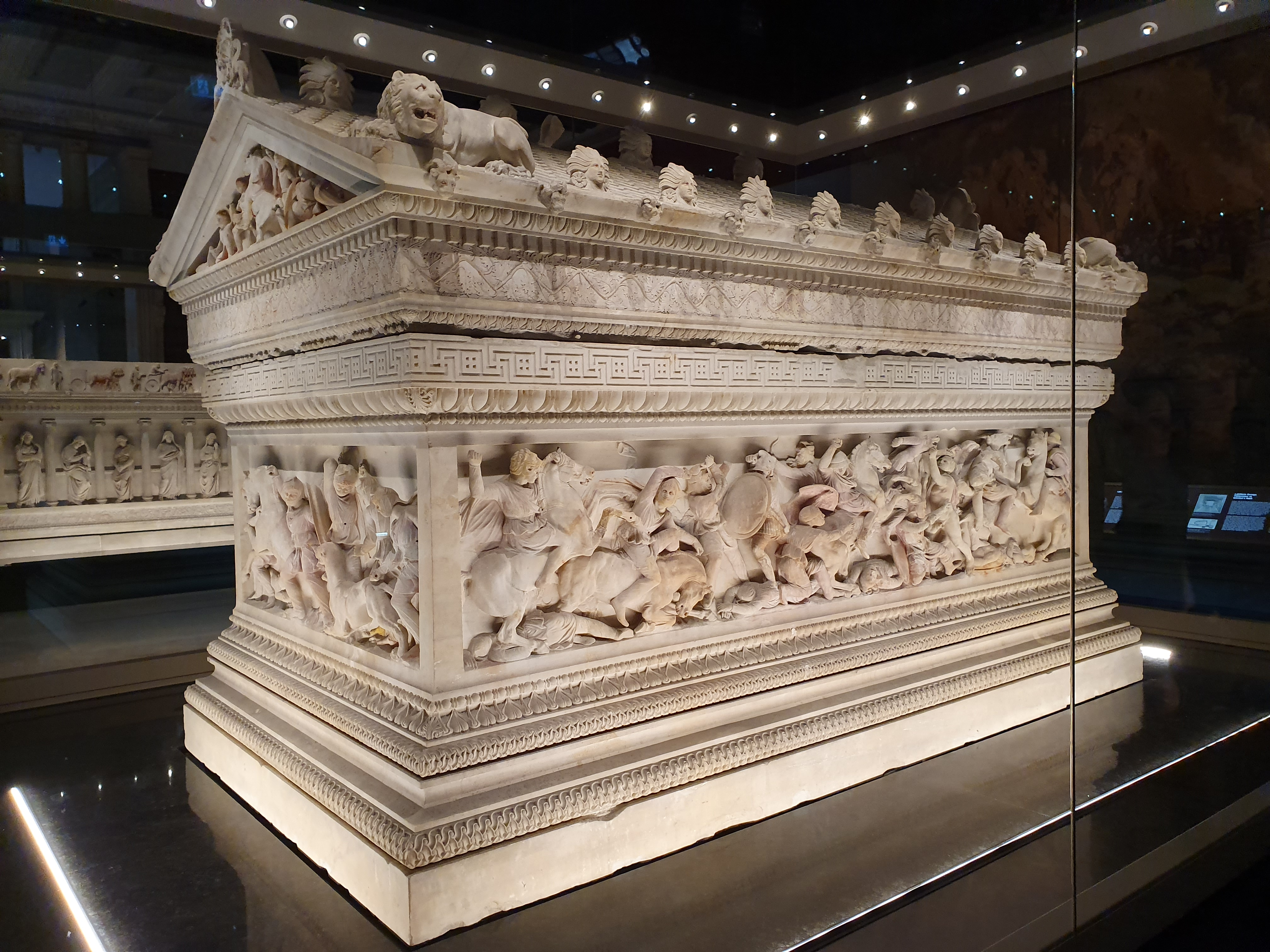
The Alexander Sarcophagus, a late 4th century BC Hellenistic sarcophagus, discovered in 1887 in the royal necropolis of Ayaa in Sidon, now in the Istanbul Archaeology Museum.

Like other Phoenician city-states, Sidon suffered from a succession of conquerors, first by the Persian Achaemenid empire in the 6th century BC, ending with its occupation by Alexander the Great in 333 BC, and the start of the Hellenistic era of Sidon's history. The Persian influence seems to have been profound, as is observed in the change of the architectural style of the city. Under the successors of Alexander, it enjoyed relative autonomy and organised games and competitions in which the greatest athletes of the region participated. In the Hellenistic-period necropolis of Sidon, important finds such as the Alexander Sarcophagus, the Lycian tomb and the Sarcophagus of the Crying Women were discovered, which are now on display at the Archaeological Museum of Istanbul.

=== Persian period ===
In 539 BC, Cyrus the Great, king and founder of the Persian Achaemenid Empire, took Babylon. As Cyrus began consolidating territories across the Near East, the Phoenicians apparently made the pragmatic calculation of "[yielding] themselves to the Persians." Most of the Levant was consolidated by Cyrus into a single satrapy (province) and forced to pay a yearly tribute of 350 talents, which was roughly half the tribute that was required of Egypt and Libya.

The Phoenician area was governed by four vassal kingdoms—Sidon, Tyre, Arwad, and Byblos—which were allowed considerable autonomy. Unlike in other empire areas, there is no record of Persian administrators governing the Phoenician city-states. Local Phoenician kings were allowed to remain in power and given the same rights as Persian satraps (governors), such as hereditary offices and minting their coins.

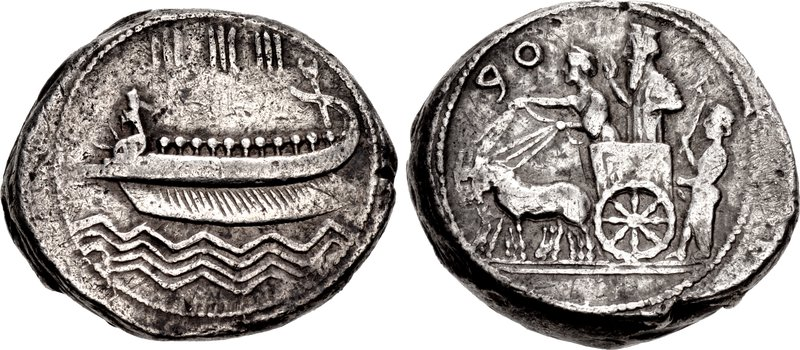
Achaemenid-era coin of Abdashtart I of Sidon, who is seen at the back of the chariot, behind the Persian King.

In exchange for supporting his conquest of Egypt, King Cambyses II of Persia awarded Sidon with the territories of Dor, Joppa, and the Plain of Sharon. (Note: See lines 18–20 of the Eshmunazar II sarcophagus inscription.) (Note: The territories of the Phoenician cities could be discontiguous: thus, the lands and the cities of Dor and Joppa belonging to the Sidonians were separated from Sidon by the city of Tyre.)

The Phoenicians remained a core asset to the Achaemenid Empire, particularly for their prowess in maritime technology and navigation; they furnished the bulk of the Persian fleet during the Greco-Persian Wars of the late fifth century BC. Phoenicians under Xerxes I built the Xerxes Canal and the pontoon bridges that allowed his forces to cross into mainland Greece. Nevertheless, they were harshly punished by the Persian King following his defeat at the Battle of Salamis, which he blamed on Phoenician cowardice and incompetence.

In the mid-fourth century BC, King Tennes of Sidon led a failed rebellion against Artaxerxes III, enlisting the help of the Egyptians, who were subsequently drawn into a war with the Persians. The resulting destruction of Sidon led to the resurgence of Tyre, which remained the dominant Phoenician city for two decades until the arrival of Alexander the Great.

=== Hellenistic period ===
Phoenicia was one of the first areas to be conquered by Alexander the Great during his military campaigns across western Asia. Alexander's main target in the Persian Levant was Tyre, now the region's largest and most important city.

Tyre's king Azemilcus was at sea with the Persian fleet when Alexander arrived at the gates in 332 BC. Alexander proposed a sacrifice to Heracles in the city, which was home to the most ancient temple of Heracles. However, the Tyrian government refused this and instead suggested that Alexander sacrifice at another temple of Heracles on the mainland at Old Tyre.

Angered by this rejection, Alexander started the Siege of Tyre despite its reputation as being impregnable. As Alexander's forces moved forward towards linking the fortified island with the mainland, the Tyrians evacuated their old men, women, and children to Carthage. According to some historical sources, fellow Phoenician sailors from Sidon and Byblos, who had been forcefully recruited by Alexander, secretly helped many Tyrians to escape.

Altogether some eight thousand Tyrians were reportedly killed during the siege, while Alexander's troops suffered only about four hundred casualties. After Alexander's victory, he granted pardon to King Azemilcus and the chief magistrates. Yet according to Arrian, approximately 30,000 citizens were sold into slavery.

The rest of Phoenicia easily came under his control, with Sidon surrendering peacefully. Although Sidon willingly submitted to Alexander the Great, he deposed its king Abdashtart II because he was a known supporter of Darius. Abdashtart II was deposed and Alexander's second in command, Hephaestion elevated Abdalonymus, a member of the Sidonian royal family who had fallen into such poverty that he supported himself by the cultivation of a kitchen garden. Curtius Rufus claims that Alexander was so impressed by Abdalonymus' character that "[he gave orders that not only the regal equipment of Straton (Abdashtart II) should be assigned to him, but also many articles from the Persian booty; he also added to his dominion a territory adjacent to [Sidon]."

"After [the Maccabean Revolt], we hear but little of any separate action on the part of the Phoenicians, or of any Phoenician city...the [Phoenician] cities had scarcely any distinctive character, or anything that marked them out as belonging to a separate nationality [from the Greeks].

== Roman period ==
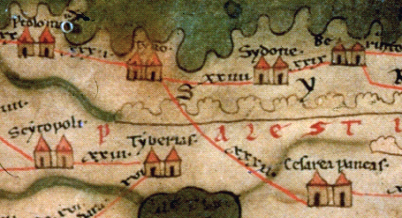
The Peutinger Table showing the location of Tyre and Sidon within the Roman Empire

When Sidon fell under Roman domination, it continued to mint its own silver coins. The Romans also built a theater and other major monuments in the city, and an underground Mithraeum was discovered. In the reign of Elagabalus, a Roman colony was established there. During the Byzantine period, when the great earthquake of AD 551 destroyed most of the cities of Phoenice, Beirut's School of Law took refuge in Sidon. The town continued quietly for the next century, until it was conquered by the Arabs in AD 636.

Economic and intellectual activities flourished in Lebanon during the Pax Romana. The inhabitants of the principal Phoenician cities of Byblos, Sidon, and Tyre were granted Roman citizenship. These cities were centers of the pottery, glass, and purple dye industries; their harbors also served as warehouses for products imported from Syria, Persia, and India. They exported cedar, perfume, jewelry, wine, and fruit to Rome. This prosperity meant Phoenicia became a notable destination for intellectuals, tradesmen and merchants; even farmers, from all over the empire and especially the east.

== Crusader-Ayyubid period ==
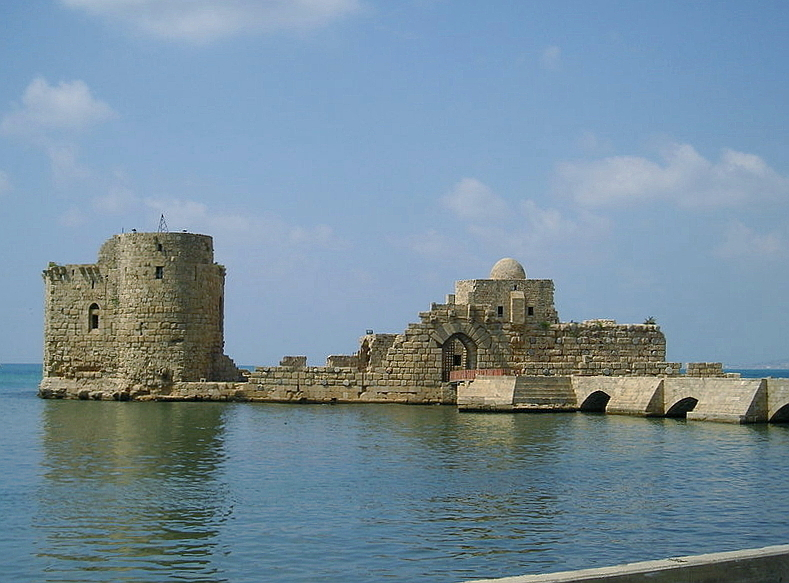
Sidon Sea Castle, built by the Crusaders in AD 1228

=== Siege of Sidon ===
In August 1108, Baldwin I marched out against Sidon, with the support of a squadron of sailor-adventurers from various Italian cities. However, the Egyptian fleet defeated the Italians in a sea-battle outside the harbour. Upon the arrival of additional Turkish horsemen from Damascus, Baldwin decided to lift the siege.

In the summer of 1110, a Norwegian fleet of 60 ships arrived in the Levant under the command of King Sigurd. Arriving in Acre he was received by Baldwin I, King of Jerusalem. Together they made a journey to the river Jordan, after which Baldwin asked for help in capturing Muslim-held ports on the coast. Sigurd's answer was that "they had come for the purpose of devoting themselves to the service of Christ", and accompanied him to take the city of Sidon, which had been re-fortified by the Fatimids in 1098.

Baldwin's army besieged the city by land, while the Norwegians came by sea. A naval force was needed to prevent assistance from the Fatimid fleet at Tyre. Repelling it was however only made possible with the fortunate arrival of a Venetian fleet. The city fell after 47 days.

When the city surrendered, King Baldwin gave the same terms of surrender he had previously given to Arsuf and Acre. He allowed safe conduct of passage for those leaving and even allowed some members of the Muslim populace to remain in peace.

By order of Baldwin and the Patriarch of Jerusalem, Ghibbelin of Arles, a splinter was taken off the holy cross and given to Sigurd. The Lordship of Sidon was created and given to Eustace Grenier, later a constable of the Kingdom of Jerusalem.

=== Roman Catholic Diocese of Sidon ===
Before the arrival of the crusaders to Syria in the late 11th century, the Orthodox bishops of Sidon had been suffragans of the archbishops of Tyre, who were in turn subject to the authority of the Orthodox patriarchs of Antioch. The first crusader king of Jerusalem, Baldwin I captured Sidon with the assistance of Venetian and Norwegian fleets on 5 December 1110. He wanted to ensure that all sees in his kingdom were subject to the Latin patriarchs of Jerusalem. He and Patriarch Ghibbelin, Latin Patriarch of Jerusalem, asked Pope Paschal II to authorize the expansion of the jurisdiction of the see of Jerusalem to include the diocese of Sidon. The Pope accepted their proposal and declared in 1111 that the boundaries of the ecclesiastic provinces should follow the political borders, making Sidon subject to Jerusalem. However, the patriarchs of Antioch, Bernard of Valence, lodged an objection with the Holy See and prevented the appointment of a bishop subject to Jerusalem at Sidon.

From the 14th-century, the Sidon became a Titular see.

=== Lordship of Sidon and the Battle of Ain Jalut ===
It then became the center of the Lordship of Sidon, an important vassal-state of the Kingdom of Jerusalem.

The Lordship of Sidon was one of the four major fiefdoms of the Kingdom of Jerusalem, one of the Crusader States. However, in reality, it appears to have been much smaller than the others and had the same level of significance as several neighbors, such as Toron and Beirut, which were sub-vassals.

Sidon was captured in December, 1110 and given to Eustace I Grenier. The lordship was a coastal strip on the Mediterranean Sea between Tyre and Beirut. It was conquered by Saladin in 1187 and remained in Muslim hands until it was restored to Christian control by German Crusaders in the Crusade of 1197. Julien Grenier sold it to the Knights Templar after it was destroyed by the Mongols in 1260 after the Battle of Ain Jalut. One of the vassals of the lordship was the Lordship of the Shuf. The Mongols attempted to form a Franco-Mongol alliance or at least to demand the submission of the remnant of the Crusader Kingdom of Jerusalem, now centered on Acre; but Pope Alexander IV had forbidden it. Tensions between the Franks and the Mongols had also increased when Julian of Sidon caused an incident which resulted in the death of one of Kitbuqa's grandsons. Angered, Kitbuqa sacked Sidon. The Barons of Acre and the remainder of the Crusader outposts, contacted by the Mongols, had also been approached by the Mamluks and sought military assistance against the Mongols.

In 1347 Sidon was hit by the Bubonic Plague during the black death. Accounts of it in all regions suggest the greatness of the calamity, especially in the coastal cities while it was transmitted by ship rats.

== Ottoman period ==
After Sidon came under Ottoman Turkish rule in the early 16th century, it became the capital of the Sidon Eyalet (province) and regained a great deal of its earlier commercial importance. The province was briefly created during Fakhr al-Din's exile in 1614–1615, and recreated in 1660. The province continued to be subordinated in some ways, both in fiscal and political matters, to the Damascus province out of which it was created.

Despite conflicts in the 1660s, the Ma'n family "played the leading role in the management of the internal affairs of this eyalet until the closing years of the 17th century, perhaps because it was not possible to manage the province-certainly not in the sanjak of Sidon-Beirut-without them."

=== Era of Fakhr al-Din II ===
==== Control of Sidon-Beirut and Safed sanjaks ====
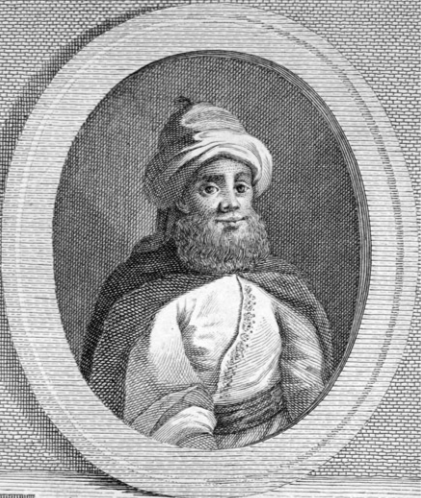
Engraving of a portrait of Fakhr al-Din II.

Around 1590 Qurqumaz was succeeded by his eldest son Fakhr al-Din II as the muqaddam of all or part of the Chouf. Unlike his Ma'nid predecessors, Fakhr al-Din cooperated with the Ottomans, who, though able to suppress Mount Lebanon's local chiefs with massive force, were unable to pacify the region in the long term without local support. When the veteran general Murad Pasha was appointed beylerbey of Damascus, Fakhr al-Din hosted and gave him expensive gifts upon his arrival to Sidon in September 1593. Murad Pasha reciprocated by appointing him the sanjak-bey (district governor, called amir liwa in Arabic sources) of Sidon-Beirut in December. The Ottomans' preoccupation with the wars against Safavid Iran (1578–1590; 1603–1618) and the war with Hapsburg Austria afforded Fakhr al-Din the space to consolidate and expand his semi-autonomous power.

In July 1602, after his political patron Murad Pasha became a vizier in Constantinople, Fakhr al-Din was appointed the sanjak-bey of Safed. With the Druze of Sidon-Beirut and Safed under his authority, he effectively became their paramount chief. Fakhr al-Din may have been appointed to the post to leverage his Druze power base against the Shia.

In 1606, Fakhr al-Din made common cause with the Kurdish rebel Ali Janbulad of Aleppo against his local rival Yusuf Sayfa of Tripoli; the latter had been invested as commander-in-chief of the Ottoman armies in the Levant to suppress Janbulad. Fakhr al-Din may have been motivated by his ambitions of regional autonomy, defense of his territory from Sayfa, or expanding his control to Beirut and Keserwan, both held by Sayfa. The rebel allies besieged Sayfa in Damascus, eventually forcing his flight. In the course of the fighting, Fakhr al-Din took over the Keserwan. When Janbulad was defeated by the Ottomans, Fakhr al-Din appeased Murad Pasha, who had since become grand vizier, with substantial sums of cash and goods. The high amount is an indicator of the Ma'ns' wealth. Fakhr al-Din was kept as sanjak-bey of Safed, his son Ali was appointed as sanjak-bey of Sidon-Beirut and the Ma'ns' control of Keserwan was recognized by the Porte.

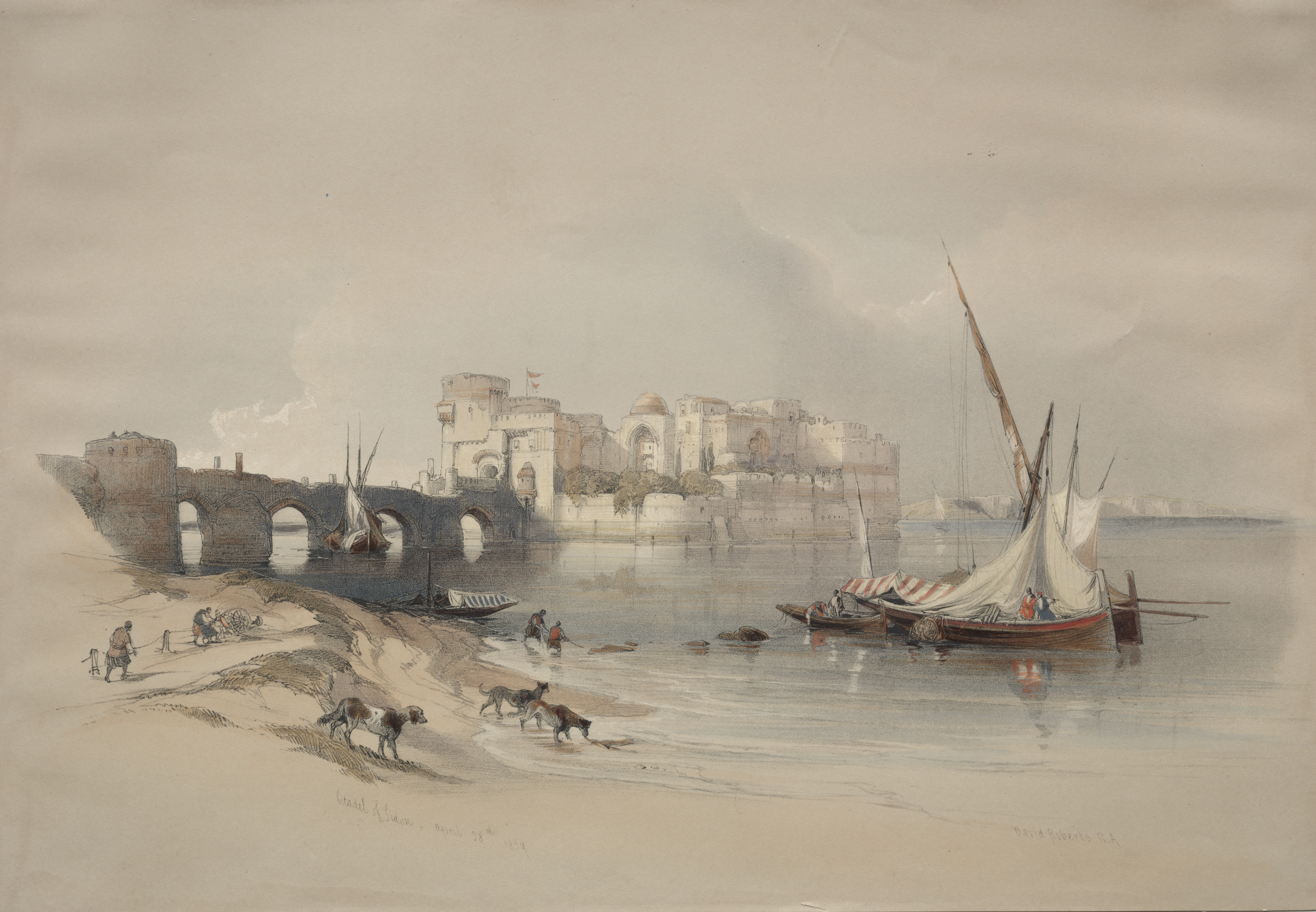
The port town of Sidon (pictured in 1843), capital of the Sidon-Beirut Sanjak, which Fakhr al-Din and his family governed between 1593 and 1633 with occasional interruption

==== Interregnum of Yunus and Ali ====
Fakhr al-Din lost imperial favor with the death of Murad Pasha in July 1611 and the succession of Nasuh Pasha. By then the Porte, freed up from the wars with Austria and Iran and the Jelali revolts in Anatolia, had turned its attention to affairs in the Levant. The authorities had become wary of Fakhr al-Din's expanding territory, his alliance with Grand Duchy of Tuscany, his unsanctioned strengthening and garrisoning of fortresses and his employment of outlawed sekbans. Nasuh Pasha appointed Ahmed Pasha, the governor of Damascus, at the head of a large army to suppress Fakhr al-Din. The latter boarded a European ship and escaped to Livorno, Tuscany.

In Fakhr al-Din's absence his younger brother Yunus acted as head of the family in the Chouf. The Ma'ns' sekbans stationed in their headquarter village of Deir al-Qamar collaborated with Ahmed Pasha, prompting Yunus to abandon the village for Baakline. Ali Ma'n, meanwhile, was deserted by his bodyguard of sekbans in Mafraq in the Syrian Desert where he evaded Ahmed Pasha. The Ma'nid fortresses of Shaqif Arnun and Subayba, which the Ottomans sought to dismantle, were controlled by the family's sekbans led by Husayn Yaziji and Husayn Tawil, respectively; with the help of the rival Harfush dynasty of Baalbek, the sekban commanders arranged the two fortresses' demolition and were rewarded by the authorities. The Ma'ns were stripped of their governorships of Sidon-Beirut, Safed, and Keserwan, but Yunus retained the tax farm of the Chouf from the governor of the newly created Sidon Eyalet in 1614. Their Druze and Shia rivals re-emerged as the tax farmers and governors of their home districts in Mount Lebanon and Jabal Amil.

Although the Ma'ns' position was severely weakened, in 1615 political circumstances changed in their favor with Nasuh Pasha being executed, Ahmed Pasha being replaced by a friendly governor, the Sidon Eyalet being dissolved, and troops being withdrawn from Syria to fight on the Iranian front. Yunus and Ali were appointed to Safed and Sidon-Beirut, respectively, and shortly after both governorships were given to Ali. The Ma'ns then confronted their Druze rivals, namely Muzaffar al-Andari of the Jurd, the Arslan chief Muhammad ibn Jamal al-Din of Choueifat in the Gharb, and the Sawwafs of Chbaniyeh in the Matn. Ali and Yunus defeated them in four engagements in the Druze Mountain, at Ighmid, Ain Dara, Abeih and the spring of Naimeh on the coast south of Beirut. In the course of the fighting, they retook control of Beirut and the Keserwan. Afterward Ali awarded the Ma'ns' Tanukhid allies and relatives the tax farms of Beirut, the Gharb and the Jurd, and the Abu'l-Lama family the tax farm of the Matn.

Growing opposition to the Ma'ns by the Shias of Safed Sanjak culminated with their backing of Yaziji's efforts to replace Ali as sanjak-bey there and their alliance with the Harfushes in 1617–1618. Yaziji was killed almost immediately after taking up office in Safed in June 1618, and Ali was restored to the post. Meanwhile, tensions rose between the Ma'ns and their Tanukhid and Abu'l-Lama allies relating to property disputes in Beirut.

==== Building works ====
Fakhr al-Din had his government house—known as a saray—built in Sidon as early as 1598. It consisted of a large courtyard, an iwan on the ground floor, several rooms, including roofed reception areas known as qa'as, a fountain, and gardens. It was positioned immediately south of a large square in the city, today called 'Saray Square' after Fakhr al-Din's construction. Other than the entrance of the building, which is characterized by ablaq masonry and a type of ornamented vaulting known as muqarnas, the rest of the original structure had been gradually replaced through the early 19th century, when it was converted into a school; the courtyard is now a schoolyard and the garden is a playground. In its original form it was the tallest structure in Sidon and its garden had a wide variety of plants.

The expansion of commercial activity and increasing wealth in Sidon overseen by Fakhr al-Din is architecturally testified by his construction of the khans and mosques he built in the city. Fakhr al-Din is commonly, though erroneously, credited with the construction of the Khan al-Franj caravansary complex. It housed the French consul around 1616 until the consul relocated to a neighboring, formerly Ma'nid-owned property, the Dar al-Musilmani, in the 1630s. The Dar al-Musilmani was built by Fakhr al-Din, who may have used it as his original residence in the city and that of his wives. Following the capture of Fakhr al-Din by Kuchuk, the latter confiscated all of the Ma'ns' properties in Sidon, Tyre, Banias, and other places. He initially endowed the family's properties in Sidon, sixty-nine in total and mostly owned by Fakhr al-Din, his son Ali, and brother Yunus, in an endowment—known as a waqf—administered from Damascus for the benefit of the Islamic holy cities of Mecca and Medina. Among the properties were dozens of houses and shops, two khans, several mills, a soap factory, a coffeehouse, and a bathhouse (or hammam).

Fakhr al-Din's two khans in Sidon were the Khan al-Ruzz (the Caravansary of Rice) and the Khan al-Qaysariyya, both built directly on the Mediterranean shore of the old city. The first was observed by d'Arvieux as having large stores for the storage of rice and other commodities on the ground floor, a covered gallery for the rooms housing visitors on the top floor, a large courtyard, and a small mosque. Today, the Khan al-Ruzz is in a poor state, with the lower floor used for small workshops and the upper floor permanently housing Sidonian and Palestinian families, while the mosque has been replaced by a different structure. The smaller, neighboring Khan al-Qaysariyya, which abutted the Bahri Mosque, had a small, square courtyard with four stores, a second floor with a covered gallery leading to twelve rooms for visitors. d'Arvieux considered it the most beautiful of three khans of Sidon, including the Khan al-Franj. It is a sandstone structure and at present the courtyard has been built on, the lodging rooms and half of the stores have been subdivided and their structure changed. Two of the larger original stores of the Khan al-Qaysariyya remain intact and are used as shops. Fakhr al-Din built dozens of shops in the markets of Suq al-Ars and Suq al-Harir, around the three khans. A number of them continue to function in the Saray Square.

=== Shihab dynasty ===
In 1660, the Ottomans, created the Sidon Eyalet, which included Mount Lebanon and Wadi al-Taym, and under the command of Grand Vizier Koprulu Mehmed Pasha, launched an expedition targeting the Shihabs of Wadi al-Taym and the Shia Muslim Hamade clan of Keserwan. As Ottoman troops raided Wadi al-Taym, the Shihabs fled to the Keserwan region in northern Mount Lebanon seeking Hamade protection. Koprulu Mehmed Pasha issued orders to Emir Ahmad Ma'n to hand over the Shihab emirs, but Emir Ahmad rejected the demand and instead fled to the Keserwan, losing his tax farms in Mount Lebanon in the process. The peasantry of the abandoned regions suffered at the hands of Ottoman troops pursuing the Shihab and Ma'n leaders. The Shihabs fled further north into Syria, taking up shelter at Jabal A'la south of Aleppo until 1663. Four years later, the Ma'ns and their Qaysi coalition defeated the Yamani coalition led by the Alam al-Din family outside the port town of Beirut. Consequently, Emir Ahmad Ma'n regained control of the Mount Lebanon tax farms. The Shihabs further solidified their alliance with the Ma'ns when, in 1674, Musa Shihab married the daughter of Emir Ahmad Ma'n. In 1680, Emir Ahmad mediated a conflict between the Shihabs and the Shia Muslim Harfush clan of the Beqaa Valley, after the latter killed Faris Shihab in 1680 (Faris had recently displaced the Harfush from Baalbek), prompting an armed mobilization by the Shihabs.

In 1693, the Ottoman authorities launched a major military expedition, consisting of 18,500 troops, against Emir Ahmad when he declined a request to suppress the Hamade sheikhs after they raided Byblos, killing forty Ottoman soldiers, including the garrison commander, Ahmad Qalawun, a descendant of Mamluk sultan Qalawun. Emir Ahmad fled and had his tax farms confiscated and transferred to Musa Alam al-Din, who also commandeered the Ma'n palace in Deir al-Qamar. The following year, Emir Ahmad and his Shihab allies mobilized their forces in Wadi al-Taym and conquered the Chouf, forcing Musa Alam al-Din to flee to Sidon. Emir Ahmad was restored his tax farms in 1695.

==== Regency of Bashir I ====
When Emir Ahmad Ma'n died without a male heir in 1697, the sheikhs of the Qaysi Druze faction of Mount Lebanon, including the Jumblatt clan, convened in Semqaniyeh and chose Bashir Shihab I to succeed Ahmad as emir of Mountain Lebanon. Bashir was related to the Ma'ns through his mother, who was the sister of Ahmad Ma'n and the wife of Bashir's father, Husayn Shihab. Due to the influence of Husayn Ma'n, the youngest of Fakhr ad-Din's sons, who was a high-ranking official in the Ottoman imperial government, the Ottoman authorities declined to confirm Bashir's authority over the tax farms of Mount Lebanon; Husayn Ma'n forsake his hereditary claim to the Ma'n emirate in favor of his career as the Ottoman ambassador to India. Instead, the Ottoman authorities appointed Husayn Ma'n's choice, Haydar Shihab, the son of Musa Shihab and Ahmad Ma'n's daughter. Haydar's appointment was confirmed by the governor of Sidon, and agreed upon by the Druze sheikhs, but because Haydar was still a minor, Bashir was kept on as regent.

The transfer of the Ma'n emirate to the Shihabs made the family's chief the holder of a large tax farm that included the Chouf, Gharb, Matn and Keserwan areas of Mount Lebanon. However, the tax farm was not owned by the Shihabi emir and was subject to annual renewal by the Ottoman authorities, who made the ultimate decision to confirm the existing holder or assign the tax farm to another holder, often another Shihab emir or a member of the rival Alam al-Din clan. The Qaysi Druze were motivated to appoint the Shihabs because the Wadi al-Taym-based Shihabs were not involved in the intertribal machinations of the Chouf, their military strength, and their marital ties to the Ma'ns. Other clans, including the Druze Jumblatts and the Maronite Khazens were subsidiary tax farmers, known as muqata'jis, who paid the Ottoman government via the Shihabs. A branch of the Shihab family continued to control Wadi al-Taym, while the Shihabs in Mount Lebanon made Deir al-Qamar their headquarters. The Shihab emir was also formally at the military service of the Ottoman authorities and was required to mobilize forces upon request. The Shihabs' new status made them the preeminent social, fiscal, military, judicial and political power in Mount Lebanon.

In 1698, Bashir gave protection to the Hamade sheikhs when they were sought out by the authorities and successfully mediated between the two sides. He also captured the rebel Mushrif ibn Ali al-Saghir, sheikh of the Shia Muslim Wa'il clan of Bilad Bishara in Jabal Amil (modern South Lebanon), and delivered him and his partisans to the governor of Sidon, who requested Bashir's assistance in the matter. As a result, Bashir was officially endowed with responsibility for the "safekeeping of Sidon Province" between the region of Safad to Keserwan. At the turn of the 18th century, the new governor of Sidon, Arslan Mataraci Pasha, continued the good relationship with Bashir, who by then had appointed a fellow Sunni Muslim Qaysi, Umar al-Zaydani, as the subsidiary tax farmer of Safad. He also secured the allegiance of the Shia Muslim Munkir and Sa'b clans to the Qaysi faction. Bashir was poisoned and died in 1705. The 17th-century Maronite Patriarch and historian, Istifan al-Duwayhi, asserts Haydar, who had since reached adulthood, was responsible for Bashir's death.

==== Reign of Haydar ====
Emir Haydar's coming to power brought about an immediate effort on the part of Sidon's governor, Bashir Pasha, a relative of Arlsan Mehmed Pasha, to roll back Shihab authority in the province. To that end, the governor directly appointed Zahir al-Umar, Umar al-Zaydani's son, as the tax farmer of Safad, and directly appointed members of the Wa'il, Munkir and Sa'ab clans as tax farmers of Jabal Amil's subdistricts. The latter two clans thereafter joined the Wa'il's and their pro-Yamani faction. The situation worsened for Emir Haydar when he was ousted by the order of Bashir Pasha and replaced with his Choufi Druze enforcer-turned enemy, Mahmoud Abi Harmoush in 1709. Emir Haydar and his Qaysi allies then fled to the Keserwani village of Ghazir, where they were given protection by the Maronite Hubaysh clan, while Mount Lebanon was overrun by a Yamani coalition led by the Alam al-Din clan. Emir Haydar fled further north to Hermel when Abi Harmoush's forces pursued him to Ghazir, which was plundered.

In 1711, the Qaysi Druze clans mobilized to restore their predominance in Mount Lebanon, and invited Emir Haydar to return and lead their forces. Emir Haydar and the Abu'l Lama family mobilized at Ras al-Matn and were joined by the Jumblatt, Talhuq, Imad, Nakad and Abd al-Malik clans, while the Yamani faction led by Abi Harmoush mobilized at Ain Dara. The Yaman received backing from the governors of Damascus and Sidon, but before the governors' forces joined the Yaman to launch a pincer attack against the Qaysi camp at Ras al-Matn, Emir Haydar launched a preemptive assault against Ain Dara. In the ensuing Battle of Ain Dara, the Yamani forces were routed, the Alam al-Din sheikhs were slain, Abi Harmoush was captured and the Ottoman governors withdrew their forces from Mount Lebanon. Emir Haydar's victory consolidated Shihab political power and the Yamani Druze were eliminated as a rival force; they were forced to leave Mount Lebanon for the Hauran.

Emir Haydar confirmed his Qaysi allies as the tax farmers of Mount Lebanon's tax districts. His victory in Ain Dara also contributed to the rise of the Maronite population in the area, as the newcomers from Tripoli's hinterland replaced the Yamani Druze and Druze numbers decreased due to the Yamani exodus. Thus, an increasing number of Maronite peasants became tenants of the mostly Druze landlords of Mount Lebanon. The Shihabs became the paramount force in Mount Lebanon's social and political configuration as they were the supreme landlords of the area and the principal intermediaries between the local sheikhs and the Ottoman authorities. This arrangement was embraced by the Ottoman governors of Sidon, Tripoli and Damascus. In addition to Mount Lebanon, the Shihabs exercised influence and maintained alliances with the various local powers of the mountain's environs, such as with the Shia Muslim clans of Jabal Amil and the Beqaa Valley, the Maronite-dominated countryside of Tripoli, and the Ottoman administrators of the port cities of Sidon, Beirut and Tripoli.

==== Reign of Mulhim ====
Emir Haydar died in 1732 and was succeeded by his eldest son, Mulhim. One of Emir Mulhim's early actions was a punitive expedition against the Wa'il clan of Jabal Amil. The Wa'il kinsmen had painted their horses' tails green in celebration of Emir Haydar's death (Emir Haydar's relations with the Wa'il clan had been poor) and Emir Mulhim took it as a grave insult. In the ensuing campaign, the Wa'ili sheikh, Nasif al-Nassar, was captured, albeit briefly. Emir Mulhim had the support of Sidon's governor in his actions in Jabal Amil.

Beginning in the 1740s, a new factionalism developed among the Druze clans. One faction was led by the Jumblatt clan and was known as the Jumblatti faction, while the Imad, Talhuq and Abd al-Malik clans formed the Imad-led Yazbak faction. Thus Qaysi-Yamani politics had been replaced with the Jumblatti-Yazbaki rivalry. In 1748, Emir Mulhim, under the orders of the governor of Damascus, burned properties belonging to the Talhuq and Abd al-Malik clans as punishment for the Yazbaki harboring of a fugitive from Damascus Eyalet. Afterward, Emir Mulhim compensated the Talhuqs. In 1749, he succeeded in adding the tax farm of Beirut to his domain, after persuading Sidon's governor to transfer the tax farm. He accomplished this by having the Talhuq clan raid the city and demonstrate the ineffectiveness of its deputy governor.

==== Power struggle for the Emirate ====
Emir Mulhim became ill and was forced to resign in 1753 by his brothers, emirs Mansur and Ahmad, who were backed by the Druze sheikhs. Emir Mulhim retired in Beirut, but he and his son Qasim attempted to wrest back control of the emirate using his relationship with an imperial official. They were unsuccessful and Emir Mulhim died in 1759. The following year, Emir Qasim was appointed in place of Emir Mansur by the governor of Sidon. However, soon after, emirs Mansur and Ahmad bribed the governor and regained the Shihabi tax farm. Relations between the brothers soured as each sought paramountcy. Emir Ahmad rallied the support of the Yazbaki Druze, and was able to briefly oust Emir Mansur from the Shihabi headquarters in Deir al-Qamar. Emir Mansur, meanwhile, relied on the Jumblatti faction and the governor of Sidon, who mobilized his troops in Beirut in support of Emir Mansur. With this support, Emir Mansur retook Deir al-Qamar and Emir Ahmad fled. Sheikh Ali Jumblatt and Sheikh Yazbak Imad managed to reconcile emirs Ahmad and Mansur, with the former relinquishing his claim on the emirate and was permitted to reside in Deir al-Qamar.

Another son of Emir Mulhim, Emir Yusuf, had backed Emir Ahmad in his struggle and had his properties in Chouf confiscated by Emir Mansur. Emir Yusuf, who was raised as a Maronite Catholic but publicly presented himself as a Sunni Muslim, gained protection from Sheikh Ali Jumblatt in Moukhtara, and the latter attempted to reconcile Emir Yusuf with his uncle. Emir Mansur declined Sheikh Ali's mediation. Sa'ad al-Khuri, Emir Yusuf's mudabbir (manager), managed to persuade Sheikh Ali to withdraw his backing of Emir Mansur, while Emir Yusuf gained the support of Uthman Pasha al-Kurji, the governor of Damascus. The latter directed his son Mehmed Pasha al-Kurji, governor of Tripoli, to transfer the tax farms of Byblos and Batroun to Emir Yusuf in 1764. With the latter two tax farms, Emir Yusuf formed a power base in Tripoli's hinterland. Under al-Khuri's guidance and with Druze allies from Chouf, Emir Yusuf led a campaign against the Hamade sheikhs in support of the Maronite clans of Dahdah, Karam and Dahir and Maronite and Sunni Muslim peasants who, since 1759, were all revolting against the Hamade clan. Emir Yusuf defeated the Hamade sheikhs and appropriated their tax farms. This not only empowered Emir Yusuf in his conflict with Emir Mansur, but it also initiated Shihabi patronage over the Maronite bishops and monks who had resented Khazen influence over church affairs and been patronized by the Hamade sheikhs, the Shihab clan's erstwhile allies.

==== Reign of Yusuf ====
In 1770, Emir Mansur resigned in favor of Emir Yusuf after being compelled to step down by the Druze sheikhs. The transition was held at the village of Barouk, where the Shihabi emirs, Druze sheikhs and religious leaders met and drew up a petition to the governors of Damascus and Sidon, confirming Emir Yusuf's ascendancy. Emir Mansur's resignation was precipitated by his alliance with Sheikh Zahir al-Umar, the Zaydani strongman of northern Palestine, and Sheikh Nasif al-Nassar of Jabal Amil in their revolt against the Ottoman governors of Syria. Sheikh Zahir and the forces of Ali Bey al-Kabir of Egypt had occupied Damascus, but withdrew after Ali Bey's leading commander, Abu al-Dhahab, who was bribed by the Ottomans. Their defeat by the Ottomans made Emir Mansur a liability to the Druze sheikhs vis-a-vis their relations with the Ottoman authorities, so they decided to depose him. Emir Yusuf cultivated ties with Uthman Pasha and his sons in Tripoli and Sidon, and with their backing, sought to challenge the autonomous power of sheikhs Zahir and Nasif. However, Emir Yusuf experienced a series of major setbacks in his cause in 1771. His ally, Uthman Pasha, was routed in the Battle of Lake Hula by Sheikh Zahir's forces. Afterward, Emir Yusuf's large Druze force from Wadi al-Taym and Chouf was routed by Sheikh Nasif's Shia cavalrymen at Nabatieh. Druze casualties during the battle amounted to some 1,500 killed, a loss similar to that suffered by the Yamani coalition at Ain Dara. Furthermore, the forces of sheikhs Zahir and Nasif captured the town of Sidon after Sheikh Ali Jumblatt withdrew. Emir Yusuf's forces were again routed when they attempt oust sheikhs Zahir and Nasif, who had key backing from the Russian fleet, which bombarded Emir Yusuf's camp.

Uthman Pasha, seeking to prevent Beirut's fall to Sheikh Zahir, appointed Ahmad Pasha al-Jazzar, who was formerly in Emir Yusuf's service, as garrison commander of the city. Emir Yusuf, as tax farmer of Beirut, agreed to the appointment and declined a bounty on al-Jazzar by Abu al-Dhahab (al-Jazzar was wanted by the Mamluk strongmen of Ottoman Egypt). However, al-Jazzar soon began acting independently after organizing the fortifications of Beirut, and Emir Yusuf appealed to Sheikh Zahir through Emir Mansur's liaising to request Russian bombardment of Beirut and oust al-Jazzar. Sheikh Zahir and the Russians acceded to Emir Yusuf's request after a large bribe was paid to them. After a four-month siege, al-Jazzar withdrew from Beirut in 1772, and Emir Yusuf penalized his Yazbaki allies, sheikhs Abd al-Salam Imad and Husayn Talhuq to compensate for the bribe he paid to the Russians. The following year, Emir Yusuf's brother, Emir Sayyid-Ahmad, took control of Qabb Ilyas and robbed a group of Damascene merchants passing through the village. Emir Yusuf subsequently captured Qabb Ilyas from his brother, and was transferred the tax farm for the Beqaa Valley by the governor of Damascus, Muhammad Pasha al-Azm.

In 1775, Sheikh Zahir was defeated and killed in an Ottoman campaign, and al-Jazzar was installed in Sheikh Zahir's Acre headquarters, and soon after, was appointed governor of Sidon. Among al-Jazzar's principal goals was to centralize authority in Sidon Eyalet and assert control over the Shihabi emirate in Mount Lebanon. To that end, he succeeded in ousting Emir Yusuf from Beirut and removing it from the Shihabi tax farm. Moreover, al-Jazzar took advantage and manipulated divisions among the Shihab emirs in order to break up the Shihabi emirate into weaker entities that he could more easily exploit for revenue. In 1778 he agreed to sell the Chouf tax farm to Emir Yusuf's brothers, emirs Sayyid-Ahmad and Effendi after the latter two gained the support of the Jumblatt and Nakad clans (Emir Yusuf's ally Sheikh Ali Jumblatt died that year). Emir Yusuf, thereafter, based himself in Ghazir and mobilized the support of his Sunni Muslim allies, the Ra'ad and Mir'ibi clans from Akkar. Al-Jazzar restored the Chouf to Emir Yusuf after he paid a large bribe, but his brothers again challenged him 1780. That time they mobilized the support of both the Jumblatti and Yazbaki factions, but their attempt to kill Sa'ad al-Khuri failed, and Effendi was killed. In addition, Emir Yusuf paid al-Jazzar to loan him troops, bribed the Yazbaki faction to defect from his Sayyid-Ahmad's forces and once again secured control of the Shihabi emirate.

==== Reign of Bashir II ====
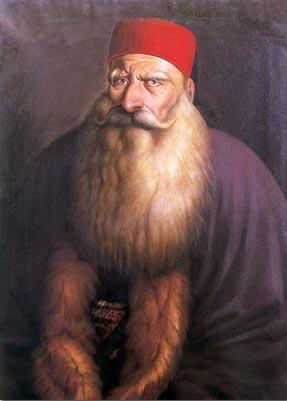
Bashir Shihab II was the Emir of Mount Lebanon from 1789 until 1840.

The most prominent among the Shihabi emirs was Emir Bashir Shihab II, who was comparable to Fakhr ad-Din II. His ability as a statesman was first tested in 1799, when Napoleon besieged Acre, a well-fortified coastal city in Palestine, about forty kilometers south of Tyre. Both Napoleon and Ahmad Pasha al-Jazzar, the governor of Sidon, requested assistance from Bashir, who remained neutral, declining to assist either combatant. Unable to conquer Acre, Napoleon returned to Egypt, and the death of Al-Jazzar in 1804 removed Bashir's principal opponent in the area.

The Ma'ns were succeeded by the Shihab family in ruling the mountainous interior of Sidon-Beirut from the final years of the 17th century through the 19th century. The governor of Sidon's rule also remained nominal in the Safed sanjak as well, where in the 18th century different local chiefs, mainly the sheikhs of the Zaydan family in the Galilee and the sheikhs of the Shia clans of Ali al-Saghir, Munkar, and Sa'b families in Jabal Amil. Even the coastal towns of Sidon, Beirut, and Acre were farmed out to the Sidon-based Hammud family. By the late 1720s, Beirut and its tax farm also went over to the Shihabs under Emir Haydar, while Acre and its tax farm came under the rule of the Zaydani sheikh Zahir al-Umar in the mid-1740s.

In 1775, when Jezzar Ahmed Pasha received the governorship of Sidon, he moved the capital to Acre. In 1799, Acre resisted a siege by Napoleon Bonaparte. Starting in the 18th century Sidon was dominated by the Hammud family of notables, who monopolized the production and exporting of cotton in the region and built numerous palaces and public works in the city. The Hammuds also served as government customs agents and tax collectors for various Ottoman religious foundations.

=== Early and mid-19th century ===
As part of the Egyptian–Ottoman War of 1831–1833, Ibrahim Pasha of Egypt took Acre after a severe siege on May 27, 1832. The Egyptian occupation intensified rivalries between Druzes and Maronites, as Ibrahim Pasha openly favored Christians in his administration and his army. In 1840, the governor of Sidon moved his residence to Beirut, effectively making it the new capital of the eyalet. After the return to Ottoman rule in 1841, the Druzes dislodged Bashir III al-Shihab, to whom the sultan had granted the title of emir. During the Egyptian–Ottoman War, Sidon – like much of Ottoman Syria – was occupied by the forces of Muhammad Ali of Egypt. His ambitions were opposed by the British Empire, which backed the Ottomans.

Admiral Stopford wanted to seize Sidon and entrusted Admiral Napier with this task. Sidon was protected by a citadel and line of wall. With eight ships Napier began shelling the square for 30 minutes. The Anglo-Ottoman forces tried to land twice, but were repelled. Tasked with directing the attack on the southern castle while the ships were still firing, Archduke Friedrich first landed a detachment, which quickly climbed the heights of the banks, and soon afterwards a second, which landed despite the enemy gunfire coming from some houses. After this detachment, combined with a detachment of Englishmen, had positioned itself as a reserve at the entrance to the town, Archduke Friedrich himself, at the head of the first detachment and a few Englishmen, advanced towards the mountain castle, which he climbed first of all. Soon afterwards a detachment of Englishmen, who had entered the city from the north, arrived there, while the Turkish troops were entering from the side of the water castle. By 6 o'clock in the afternoon Sidon was captured. 1,500 Egyptians were taken prisoner.

In 1842 the Ottoman government introduced the Double Kaymakamate, whereby Mount Lebanon would be governed by a Maronite appointee and the more southerly regions of Kisrawan and Shuf would be governed by a Druze. Both would remain under the indirect rule of the governor of Sidon. This partition of Lebanon proved to be a mistake. Animosities between the religious sects increased, and by 1860 they escalated into a full-blown sectarian violence. In the 1860 Lebanon conflict that followed, thousands of Christians were killed in massacres that culminated with the Damascus Riots of July 1860.

From 1887 the Royal necropolis of Sidon was extensively excavated by the Ottomans, and its treasures transferred to Istanbul (like the Alexander sarcophagus).

=== Dissolution ===
Following the international outcry caused by the massacres, the French landed troops in Beirut and the Ottomans abolished the unworkable system of the Kaymakamate and instituted in its place the Mutasarrifate of Mount Lebanon, a Maronite-majority district to be governed by non-Lebanese Christian Mutasarrıf, which was the direct predecessor of the political system that continued to exist in Lebanon's early post-independence years. The new arrangement ended the turmoil, and the region prospered in the last decades of the Ottoman Empire.

== Modern Lebanon ==
=== Greater Lebanon ===
The allied forces of the British and the French occupied the Syrian coast in 1918, while the forces of Great Arab Revolt occupied the interior. When the elections were announced for the Syrian National Congress, Rida Al-Solh and his son Riad and Afif Al-Solh represented Sidon, Rida Al-Solh was chosen as Minister of Interior in the government of Ali Rida Al-Rikabi.

After the occupation of Syria in July 1920 (the mandate deed was not issued until 1922), the four districts (which are Baalbek, Western Bekaa, Rashaya, and Hasbaya from the lands of the province of Damascus) were annexed to Mount Lebanon by Resolution 299 dated 3-8-1920, and then parts of the two provinces of Beirut were annexed. (Sanjis of Beirut and Sidon) and Tripoli (the districts of Tripoli and Akkar and a section of the district of Hisn al-Akrad) and the Mutasarrifate of Mount Lebanon by Resolution 319 dated 9/1/1920 under the name of Greater Lebanon. The French divided Lebanon into six districts, one of which was southern Lebanon and its center in Sidon, then on September 4, 1925 they re-divided it into eleven governorates, then on 2 March 1930 into five governorates. The governorate of South Lebanon, with Sidon as its base, consisted of seven districts: Sidon, Tyre, Hasbaya and Marjeyoun, Bint Jbeil, Nabatiyeh, and Jezzine, and these districts are what still stand today.

A large demonstration took place in Sidon in August 1936 in solidarity with the Palestinian movement. The gendarmerie used fire to disperse it, and two people were killed and wounded. Then four of its advocates were arrested. The city went on strike for eight days until the detainees were released. And when the President of the Republic and members of the government were arrested on October 11, 1943, and among them were from Sidon, its president, Riad al-Solh, and Adel Osseiran (Minister of Trade and Industry at that time, and later Speaker of the House of Representatives), the largest demonstration in the history of Sidon was launched from Shakria which lead to clashed with the French authorities that killed 6 and wounded many. In 1948, many of Sidon's residents volunteered in the Salvation Army to fight in Palestine, headed by Maarouf Saad. After the exodus of the Palestinians in 1949, the Ain al-Hilweh Palestinian refugee camp was formed, three kilometers southeast of Sidon, which expanded as a result of subsequent migrations to become the largest camp in Lebanon in area and population.

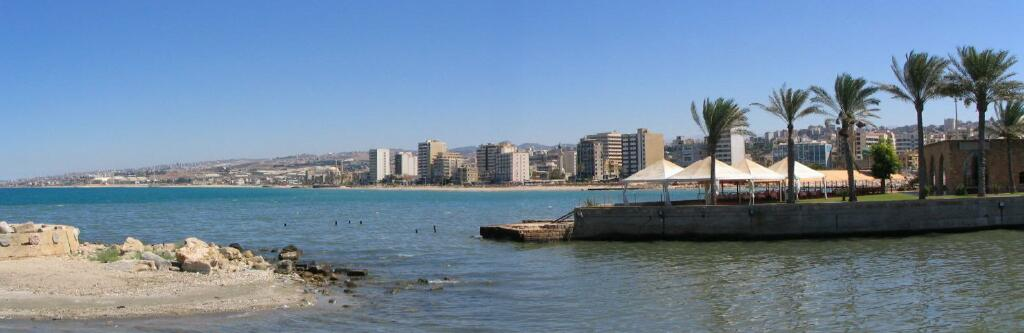
Sidon with a view of the Mediterranean coast

==== World War II ====
The Battle of Sidon was part of the Australian 7th Division's advance on Beirut, which took place between 13–15 June 1941 during the five-week-long Syria-Lebanon campaign fought between the Allies and Vichy French forces in Syria and Lebanon.

The fighting came several days after the Allied forces from the Australian 21st Brigade, under Brigadier Jack Stevens, crossed the Litani River as part of Operation Exporter. After preliminary moves by the 2/27th Infantry Battalion around Adloun, the 2/14th Infantry Battalion had carried the advance north along the coast towards Sidon. On 13 June, the 2/16th Infantry Battalion, with artillery and cavalry support, was assigned the task of capturing the town itself, undertaking a daylight advance over 6.5 kilometres (4.0 mi) of open ground to reach the town, before exploiting a further 4.5 kilometres (2.8 mi) to the north. The presence of the historic buildings meant that the Australian artillery bombardment of the town was limited in an effort to prevent collateral damage, which slowed the Allied advance.

On the periphery, the 2/27th was also active around Miyeoumiye to the south-east during the fighting. The town fell on 15 June, after the Australians completed a long approach march and overcame a determined French counterattack the included tanks. French aircraft were also active during the battle, attacking the 2/4th Field Regiment's positions and the headquarters of the 2/16th Infantry Battalion.

=== Palestinian refuge ===
Following the 1948 Palestinian expulsion and flight, a considerable number of Palestinian refugees arrived in Sidon, as in other Lebanese cities, and were settled at the large refugee camps of Ein el-Hilweh and Mieh Mieh. At first these consisted of enormous rows of tents, but gradually houses were constructed. The refugee camps constituted de facto neighborhoods of Sidon, but had a separate legal and political status which made them into a kind of enclaves. At the same time, the remaining Jews of the city fled, and the Jewish cemetery fell into disrepair, threatened by coastal erosion.

=== Rise of political families ===
The local politics of Sidon in the 20th century was mainly dominated up till the 1980s by allegiances around two main families, the El-Bizri and Saad. The El-Bizri politicians were known for their business connections, close ties with eminent Lebanese and Levantine leaders, and their bent on serving the Lebanese state as government ministers, officials and mayors. The Saad politicians tended to be populist and became engaged in violent protests in the 1940s, 1950s and then during the Lebanese civil war as Nasserites (populist followers of Nasser in Lebanon).

The local political conflict between these two families was always resolved through amicable means and ties of kinship. Their hold over the political aspects of the city was similar to that of Mediterranean families in Sicily or to being also influenced by the ties of Arab families, clans, and tribes in traditionalist forms. The most notable figures of the El-Bizri family in the first half of the 20th century were: Ahmad El-Bizri (born 1899), Salah El-Bizri, Eizeddine El-Bizri and Anwar El-Bizri (born 1910). These four brothers were businessmen and politicians who dominated the political life of the city up till the late 1940s, using traditional inherited forms of governance since Ottoman times. With intelligence and strength they maintained their power for over 50 years. It is from their ranks that Maarouf Saad started his public life, and their close cousins, Nazih El-Bizri, Amin El-Bizri, and Fouad El-Bizri became the next generation of politicians and statesmen in Lebanon; holding positions as ministers and members of parliament.

The El-Bizri and the Saad political practices were bent on social justice and on local service in public affairs. The El-Bizri were since the Ottoman rule bent on serving the state, and this continued with their loyalty and support to the successive governments of Lebanon since the times of independence. They also helped eminent politicians and statesmen from Sidonian descent such as the Prime Ministers Riad Solh, Takieddine el-Solh and Rashid Solh, they also gave their support to former Prime Minister Saeb Salam, father of Tamam Salam, Prime Minister 2014–2016. The presence of the El-Bizris was at times intimidating on the local scene, but they were also known for their goodwill and dignified public service.

The Saad family developed their links with Nasserism in the 1950s and engaged in the uprising and armed protest of 1958 against the government of the Lebanese President Chamoun. They also became involved in the civil war as part of the left wing politics of the Lebanon (Al-Haraka al-Wataniyya) with PLO connections, and they actively contributed to resisting the Israeli occupation after 1982. The Saads remained populist in their politics and focused on the grassroots, while the El-Bizri were generally appealing to the middle and upper classes. In the middle 1980s, the Hariri family started to rise to prominence and it became the most influential in Sidon in political and financial terms, even though the presence of the Saad and the El-Bizri in local politics remained significant at the level of visibility and activism.

The politics of Sidon is similar to that of the traditional old cities of the Levant in the sense of being family-based. In broad terms one could say that the El-Bizri family had an influence since Ottoman times, and most significantly during the entirety of the 20th century. It was local in impact at first, but then the members of this family became influential within the Lebanese state and institutions, and they supported the Solh family that had successive Prime Ministers and that moved its power base from Sidon to Beirut. The Saad family developed its original politics from within the sphere of influence of the El-Bizri family and then became a power to reckon with on its own after 1948, and most powerfully in 1958

=== PLO insurgency ===
While Sidon's traditional political order had long been managed by influential local families, this structure began to erode as the city became a focal point for regional tensions. A critical turning point occurred on April 23, 1969, during the "Battle of the Souq", when pro-Palestinian demonstrations escalated into an armed takeover of the city center by Fatah militants and local Nasserist elements. The confrontation resulted in several deaths among the Internal Security Forces (ISF) and civilian bystanders, an event cited by historians as a primary catalyst for the 1969 Cairo Agreement. This treaty officially sanctioned the Palestinian armed presence in Lebanon and effectively superseded the influence of the city's traditional administrative families.

These forces enabled the PLO / Fatah (Fatah constituted 80% of the membership of the PLO and Fatah guerrillas controlled most of its institutions now) to transform the Western Part of Beirut into its stronghold. The PLO had taken over the heart of Sidon and Tyre in the early 1970s, it controlled great swathes of south Lebanon, in which the indigenous Shiite population had to suffer the humiliation of passing through PLO checkpoints and now they had worked their way by force into Beirut. The PLO did this with the assistance of so-called volunteers from Libya and Algeria shipped in through the ports it controlled, as well as a number of Sunni Lebanese groups who had been trained and armed by PLO/ Fatah and encouraged to declare themselves as separate militias. However, as Rex Brynen makes clear in his publication on the PLO, these militias were nothing more than "shop-fronts" or in Arabic "Dakakin" for Fatah, armed gangs with no ideological foundation and no organic reason for their existence save the fact their individual members were put on PLO/ Fatah payroll.

While Maarouf Saad was one of the staunchest Lebanese supporters of the Palestinian cause, he was also a critic of the PLO guerrillas' increasingly defiant attempts to gain control over Sidon, where Maarouf Saad was traditionally dominant. In 1969 he was sharply criticized by the as-Saiqa, a Syrian-backed faction of the PLO, for not agreeing to support their fighters during a shootout with the Lebanese Army.

In August 1970, a group of PLO guerrillas from the Fatah and as-Saiqa factions based in the nearby Ain al-Hilweh camp came into conflict with Saad's Nasserist partisans, resulting in the death of one Nasserist fighter. The guerillas subsequently detained Saad in the camp and shut down his supporters' office in Sidon. A general strike in the area was declared as protest to Saad's detention and calls by incensed residents for the closing of guerrilla offices in Sidon were made. Saad was consequently released days later after intervention by an envoy sent by President Nasser.

Saad lost the 1972 parliamentary election. He alleged that Prime Minister Saeb Salam's support for Bizri in retaliation for Saad's participation in anti-government protests prior to the election caused his defeat. However, Salam's support for Bizri was only a partial reason for Saad's loss of votes. Another factor was that the roughly 1,000 voters of Palestinian origin in Sidon switched from their traditional support for Saad to Bizri during the election. By that time, the PLO had become much stronger in the area and did not require the political cover Saad had traditionally lent them. This became another source of tension between Saad and the PLO, who were then targeting Saad's traditional voting base: the pan-Arabist sympathizers of the Old City of Sidon and local leftists. This also contributed to the waning of Saad's reputation as the "man of the people" in the city.

Saad had become the chairman of Sidon's municipal council in the early 1970s, in effect becoming its mayor. However, Salam ordered the council dissolved in 1973 to Saad's protestations. That year, Saad founded the Popular Nasserite Organization, a group espousing Arab nationalism and socialism in the tradition of Nasser, who died in September 1970. He also headed Sidon's fishermen's union. Relations between Sidon's residents and the government grew increasingly tense, partly a result of Saad's own increasingly antagonistic relationship with the national government.

=== Lebanese Civil War ===
==== Assassination of Maarouf Saad ====
The strike of fishermen at Sidon in February 1975 could also be considered the first important episode that set off the outbreak of the civil war. That event involved a specific issue: the attempt of former President Camille Chamoun (also head of the Maronite-oriented National Liberal Party) to monopolize fishing along the coast of Lebanon. The injustices perceived by the fishermen evoked sympathy from many Lebanese and reinforced the resentment and antipathy that were widely felt against the state and the economic monopolies. The demonstrations against the fishing company were quickly transformed into a political action supported by the political left and their allies in the Palestine Liberation Organization (PLO). The state tried to suppress the demonstrators, and a sniper reportedly killed a popular figure in the city, the former Mayor of Sidon, Maarouf Saad.

Many non-academic sources claim a government sniper killed Saad; however, there is no evidence to support such a claim, and it appears that whoever had killed him had intended that what began as a small and quiet demonstration to evolve into something more. The sniper targeted Saad right at the end of the demonstration as it was dissipating. Farid Khazen, sourcing the local histories of Sidon academics and eyewitnesses, gives a run-down of the puzzling events of the day that based on their research. Other interesting facts that Khazen reveals, based on the Sidon academic's work including that Saad was not in dispute with the fishing consortium made up of Yugoslav nationals. In fact, the Yugoslavian representatives in Lebanon had negotiated with the fisherman's union to make the fishermen shareholders in the company; the company offered to modernize the fishermen's equipment, buy their catch, and give their union an annual subsidy. Saad, as a union representative (and not the mayor of Sidon at the time as many erroneous sources claim), was offered a place on the company's board too. There has been some speculation that Saad's attempts to narrow the differences between the fishermen and the consortium, and his acceptance of a place on the board made him a target of attack by the conspirator who sought a full conflagration around the small protest. The events in Sidon were not contained for long. The government began to lose control of the situation in 1975 and resulted in a 15-year war.

On Easter Sunday, 19 April 1981, at least sixteen people were killed in Sidon after the (South Lebanon Army) SLA's long-range artillery indiscriminately shelled the city centre. It was reported that it was in response to a request from Bashir Gemayel in connection with ongoing Syrian attacks on Phalangist positions around Zahle. Israel denied involvement.

==== 1982 Israeli invasion ====
On 6 June 1982, Israeli forces under direction of Defense Minister Ariel Sharon launched a three-pronged invasion of southern Lebanon in "Operation Peace for Galilee". Roughly 60,000 troops and more than 800 tanks, heavily supported by aircraft, attack helicopters, artillery, and missile boats, crossed the Israel–Lebanon border in three areas. Simultaneously, Israeli armor, paratroopers, and naval commandos set sail in amphibious landing ships from Ashdod towards the Lebanese coast north of Sidon. Israel's publicly stated objective was to push PLO forces back 40 kilometers (25 mi) to the north. The westernmost Israeli force was to advance up the coastal road to Tyre. Its mission was to bypass Tyre and destroy three PLO camps in the area, then move up the coast towards Sidon and Damour, while Israeli forces would simultaneously conduct an amphibious landing north of Sidon to cut off the retreat of PLO forces there. In the center, two divisions were to advance both north and south of the high ground overlooked by Beaufort Castle, which was being used as a PLO stronghold, and take the road junction at Nabatieh, while an elite reconnaissance battalion was to take the castle itself. The two divisions were then to split, with one heading west to link up with the forces along the coast, and another towards Jezzine and from there along the right flank of Syrian forces in the Bekaa Valley. The easternmost Israeli force, the largest of the three, advanced into the Bekaa Valley. Its mission was to prevent Syrian reinforcements from being sent and to stop Syrian forces from attempting to interfere with the operation on the coastal road.

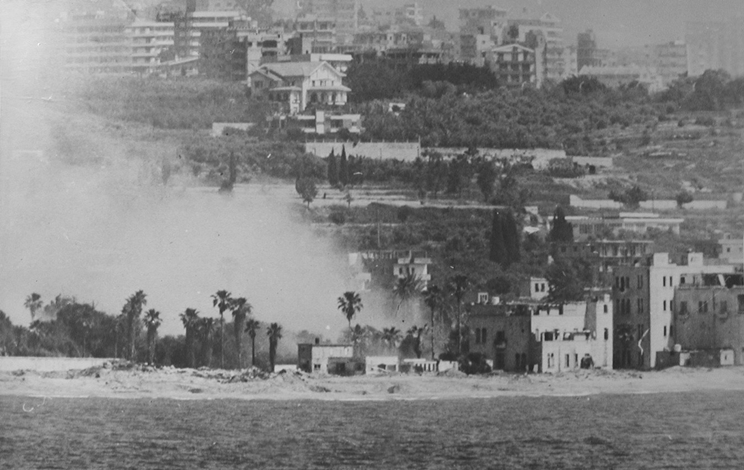
An Israeli bombardment of a PLO position on the Lebanese coast

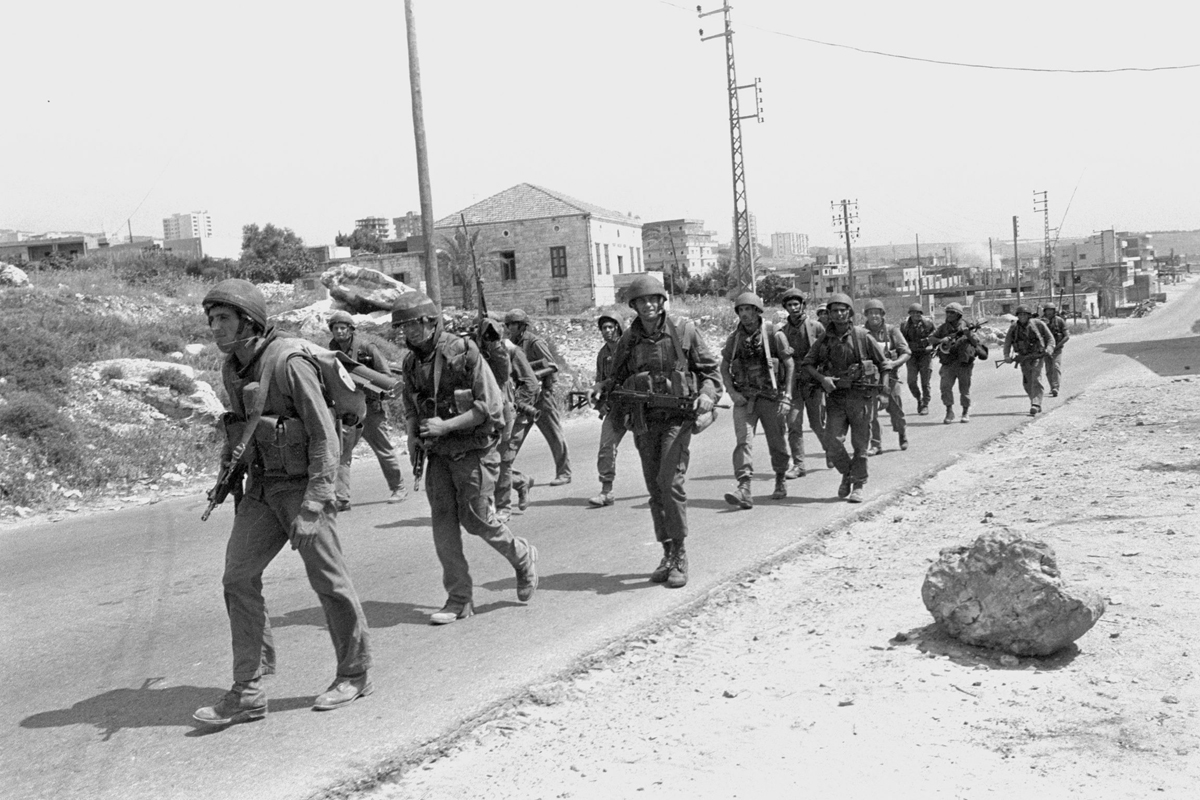
Israeli troops in Lebanon, 1982

The advance along the coastal road was preceded by heavy artillery bombardment and airstrikes, but quickly became bogged down and was soon behind schedule. The narrowness of the road forced a slow advance, and Israeli armor became stuck in a large traffic jam. Several armored vehicles were knocked out by PLO fighters with anti-tank weaponry hiding in three groves along the road. One of the lead battalions, which was supposed to bypass Tyre and establish a blocking position to the north of the city, made a wrong turn and found itself in the center of the city, where it was ambushed. At eight in the evening the force finally crossed the Litani River and headed towards Sidon. In the central sector, the mission went as planned. The two Israeli divisions bypassed Beaufort Castle on both sides. Although an order to postpone the capture of Beaufort Castle was issued, it did not reach Israeli forces in time to prevent the operation, and Israeli troops of the Golani Brigade captured the castle in the fiercely-fought Battle of the Beaufort. The road junction at Nabatieh was also secured by the end of the first day. Meanwhile, the easternmost force penetrated into the Bekaa Valley and bore down on the Syrian positions. One division bypassed Mount Hermon via a road bulldozed by Israeli military engineers and cleared the town of Hasbaiya before swinging right and advancing towards Rachaiya. Though Israeli forces halted in the floor of the valley, they were flanking Syrian forces from the east and west. The Syrians put up minimal resistance and conducted some harassing artillery fire. By the end of the first day, the operation had gone almost entirely according to plan, though the advance along the coastal road was behind schedule.

Despite the delays, the Israeli advance along the coastal road continued steadily. This advance was supported by heavy air attacks against PLO positions that included the use of cluster bombs. Israeli missile boats also employed 76mm cannons to destroy targets along the coast, firing 3,500 shells during ten days of fighting. Israeli armor continued to advance towards Sidon, while other Israeli infantry attacked the three Palestinian refugee camps in the area that were used as PLO bases: Rashidiya, Burj ash-Shamali, and al-Bass. The camps were all crisscrossed with networks of bunkers, trenches, and firing positions. The Israelis took each camp section by section using the same method: warnings were blared by loudspeaker urging civilians to leave, before air and artillery bombardment commenced, followed by an infantry assault. Israeli infantry had to engage in fierce urban combat in narrow streets. The PLO defenders put up strong resistance and sometimes used civilians as human shields. It took four days of combat to secure Rashidiya and three days to secure the other two camps. At the same time, an Israeli amphibious operation was conducted north of Sidon, beginning with a diversionary bombardment of targets away from the landing zone by missile boats and aircraft. Two groups of commandos from the Shayetet 13 naval commando unit then came ashore to probe enemy defenses and secure the landing site, one of which swam to the mouth of the Awali River and another which came ashore on the landing beach in rubber dinghies. After a brief gunbattle with armed Palestinians, the main landings began, with paratroopers coming ashore in rubber dinghies to establish a beachhead followed by three landing craft that unloaded troops and armor. Over the following days, the three landing ships would run between Israel and Lebanon, shuttling more troops and armor onto the beachhead. The PLO response was limited to ineffective mortar fire, while Israeli missile boats and aircraft attacked Palestinian positions in response, and in total, about 2,400 soldiers and 400 tanks and armored personnel carriers were landed. From the beach, these forces advanced on Sidon, supported by naval gunfire from missile boats. At the same time, Israeli forces in the central sector advanced towards Jezzine while those in the eastern sector remained in place, but began setting up heavy artillery positions that put Syrian SAM units in artillery range.

Meanwhile, Israeli forces advancing along the coastal road reached the outskirts of Sidon, but were delayed by heavy resistance in the main streets and the Ain al-Hilweh refugee camp on the southeastern edge of the city, and after an attempt by paratroopers to capture the city center and secure the south–north route through the city failed, the city was bypassed via a detour through the hills to the east. After linking up with the forces that had landed north of Sidon, while another force of paratroopers and armor with heavy air and artillery support advanced through central Sidon and cleared a south–north route through the city in fierce fighting. Another Israeli division passed through the city to link up with the forces north of Sidon.

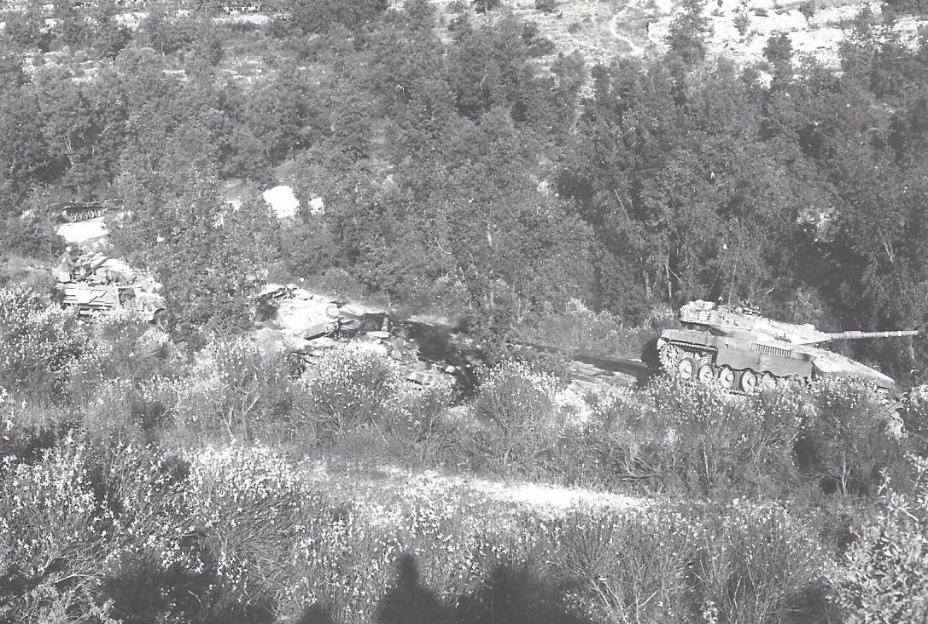
An Israeli tank advances past destroyed Syrian tanks during the Battle of Jezzine

In the center, most Israeli forces advancing towards Jezzine bypassed the town to continue advancing towards the main highway in the area, leaving a blocking force in the area that was soon joined by an armored brigade. Fighting broke out in Jezzine between the Israelis and Syrian forces holding the town. In the Battle of Jezzine, Israeli forces consisting of two tank battalions supported by a reconnaissance company and engineering platoon took Jezzine in a fierce daylong battle against a Syrian battalion, then repulsed a fierce counterattack by dozens of Syrian commandos during the night in combat that lasted until dawn. Meanwhile, Israeli forces continued to advance along the Syrians' right flank.

Israeli forces advancing along the coast also completed the capture of Sidon. Paratroopers attacked the Kasbah while a combined force of Golani Brigade infantry and tanks attacked Ain al-Hilweh. The Kasbah was secured in three days; the paratroopers advanced cautiously and managed to take it without suffering any casualties. However, the fighting at Ain al-Hilweh was to prove some of the fiercest of the entire war. The camp was heavily fortified and defended by PLO fighters and Islamic fundamentalists. The defenders fought fiercely over every alley and house, with civilians who wanted to surrender shot by the fundamentalists. The Israeli advance was slow and was supported by massive air and artillery bombardment. The IDF employed its previous tactics of urging civilians to leave with loudspeakers before attacking an area. It took about eight days for the camp to fall, with the battle culminating in a last stand by the defenders at the camp mosque, which was blown up by the IDF.

==== War of the camps ====
Tensions grew between the Amal militia and the PLO which soon erupted into a 2-year long battle in Southern Lebanon which had also effected the city of Sidon.

The presence of Palestinian guerrillas in the predominantly Shia areas led to frequent clashes. The third and deadliest battle began on 29 September 1986, when fighting broke out around the Rashidieh camp in Tyre between Amal and locally based PLO groups. Amal surrounded and blockaded the camp, though some supplies arrived by sea. All the smaller Palestinian camps were destroyed and hundreds of homes set on fire. A thousand Palestinian men were kidnapped. By December 7,500 Palestinian civilians had fled from Tyre to Sidon which was not under Amal’s control. Thousands of others fled inland. Around 7,000 non-combatants remained in the camp. A month after the break-out of fighting in Tyre Amal laid siege to the camps in Beirut. On 24 November a force consisting of most of the Palestinian factions in Sidon launched an offensive against Amal positions the Christian town of Maghdouché on the eastern hills of Sidon, in order to re-open the road to Rashidieh. In a week of fighting they managed to take control of most of the town. During the offensive the Israel Air Force (IAF) launched several air strikes against Palestinian positions around the Sidon. As before, the Arab League pressured both parties to stop the fighting. On 1 December King Fahd of Saudi Arabia is quoted as saying the attacks on the camps "wounded the Arabs everywhere". A cease-fire was negotiated between Amal and pro-Syrian Palestinian groups on 15 December 1986, but it was rejected by Arafat's Fatah, who tried to appease the situation by giving some of its positions to the Al-Mourabitoun militia in exchange for supplies to the camps.

==== Battle of Sidon ====
The Battle of Sidon was a battle fought between the Palestine Liberation Organization (PLO) and the Lebanese Government from 2 to 6 July 1991, and was the final battle of the Lebanese Civil War. The causes of the battle laid in the PLO's refusal to accept the Taif Agreement, which required the PLO to disarm. The government's deadline for PLO withdrawal from Sidon was on 1 July 1991. After four days of fighting, the PLO capitulated, marking the end of hostilities in the Lebanese Civil War. The Lebanese Government hoped that defeating the PLO would convince Israel to end its occupation of Southern Lebanon, which the Israeli government justified by its need for a buffer against PLO incursions.

=== Israeli conflict ===
On 18 August 1997, following a roadside bomb near Jezzine which killed of two teenage members of a SLA leader's family, SLA artillery shelled Sidon killing seven civilians and wounding thirty-five. Hizbollah responded the following day by firing 60–80 rockets into the security zone and northern Israel. According to UNIFIL observers the missiles appeared to be targeted at uninhabited areas. The attack on Sidon is credited with leading to a truce between Hizbollah and Amal and increased cooperation between the two groups and the Lebanese Army. This was evident in the Ansariya ambush the following month.

On 8 June 1999 two gunmen entered the Palais de Justice, Sidon's main courthouse, and shot dead three magistrates and a chief prosecutor. The attackers escaped. No group claimed responsibility but suspicion focused on Osbat al-Ansar whose leader had been sentenced to death in absentia for the murder of the head of the Sufi Al-Ahbash movement and the attempted assassination of the mufti of Tripoli. He was believed to be in hiding in the Ain al-Hilwa refugee camp.

=== Syrian Civil War spillover ===
Between 2011 and 2017, fighting from the Syrian Civil War spilled over into Lebanon as opponents and supporters of the Syrian Arab Republic traveled to Lebanon to fight and attack each other on Lebanese soil. The Syrian conflict stoked a resurgence of sectarian violence in Lebanon, with many of Lebanon's Sunni Muslims supporting the rebels in Syria, while many of Lebanon's Shi'a Muslims supporting the Ba'athist Syrian government which is led by Bashar al-Assad, whose Alawite minority is usually described as an offshoot of Shi'a Islam. Killings, unrest and sectarian kidnappings was heavily concentrated near the Syrian borders, Beirut and Sidon as Ahmed al-Assir gained popularity in Sidon.

==== 2012 and 2013 Sidon clashes ====
On 11 November 2012, three people were killed and four others wounded after supporters of Assir clashed with supporters of Hezbollah in the southern city of Sidon. Assir stated "We have a blood score to settle with Hezbollah that can only be settled with blood", and that he considered forming an "armed resistance group" to defend Lebanon from Israel as he believed that Hezbollah's weapons had now been pointed internally.

On 3 January 2013, one person was killed and three hurt during clashes between the Popular Nasserite Organization and the Hezbollah-affiliated Resistance Brigades. The following day, the body of a Palestinian man was found in Sidon by the army.

==== 2013 Sidon clashes ====
In June 2013, clashes broke out in an eastern suburb of Sidon after several people attacked, threw stones and shattered windows in a car belonging to Assir's brother, Amjad al-Assir. Assir then gave Hezbollah a one-week ultimatum to vacate apartments occupied by the group's supporters in the mostly Sunni city containing heavy weapon in a civilian compound, as clashes broke out with gunmen wielding automatic rifles and rocket-propelled grenades. Officials stated that the gunmen fighting Assir's followers were believed to be Hezbollah sympathizers.

Lebanese army troops deployed in the area of the fighting, which subsided after several hours. The military called on gunmen loyal to Assir to withdraw immediately from the streets whilst ignoring the presence of Hezbollah gunmen.

A group of Assir's followers were believed to stage armed attacks on several civil apartments in Saida, which were reportedly identified as Hezbollah offices. Some Lebanese saw the attacks as highlights of a series of provocations initiated by Saudi and Qatar-backed Sunni fundamentalists whilst many others believed Iran was the real reason for the provocations.

On 23 June 2013, according to news channels loyal to Hezbollah said that 10 Lebanese Army soldiers were killed and 35 wounded in a clash with armed men loyal to Assir, in Sidon at an Army post near the Abra complex that houses the Bilal bin Rabah Mosque. Other Lebanese news channels denied this and accused Hezbollah militias of being involved. Violence started with a deadly attack on an army checkpoint. Roads were later blocked in other parts of the country, and the army came under fire in the Ain el-Hilweh camp.

During 23–24 June 2013, heavy street fighting erupted between the Lebanese Army and gunmen loyal to Assir in Sidon as they were falsely accused of provoking the attack. Sixteen Lebanese soldiers and more than twenty Assir supporters were killed. A bodyguard of a cleric, who tried to reach the fighting to negotiate a ceasefire, also died. More than 100 Lebanese soldiers were wounded, as well as 13 pro-Assir militants. The Lebanese army requested for the country's politicians to intervene. On Monday June 24, 2013, Lebanese Army commandos seized a complex controlled by gunmen loyal to Assir in the southern city of Sidon, shortly after he fled the premises to an unknown destination.

Assir reportedly fled the complex at around 10 a.m., shortly after the Army stormed the premises which the military gradually gained control over throughout the day. Sources said soldiers were still trading gunfire with snipers located on the rooftops of nearby buildings. Sixty-five gunmen, including several Palestinian and Syrian refugees, reportedly either surrendered or were captured by Army units during the raid on the complex. Lebanon's military prosecutor issued arrest warrants against Assir and 123 of his followers. The warrants also included the name of Assir's brother.

The raid on the compound at noon came after an attempt by a group of Salafi preachers to mediate a truce reached a dead end, with the Army determined to continue its operations. There is no factual basis for the claim that Assir was captured and his followers crushed. His fate remains unknown, however, the army is treating the matter as a capture or kill operation on the basis that they believe it was only Assir that killed Lebanese soldiers in "cold blood", according to a military statement.

== See also ==
- Sidon
- History of Lebanon
- List of extrajudicial killings and political violence in Lebanon
