= Fadel Chaker =

Fadel Chaker فضل عبد الرحمن شاكر
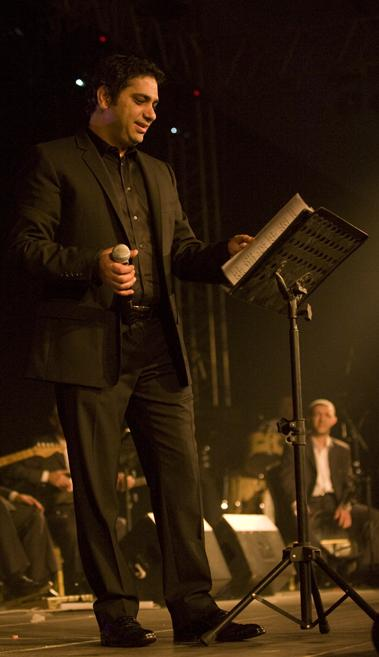
- Fadel Chaker at a performance in 2008

Background information
- Also known as: King of Feeling
- Born: Fadel Abdul Rahman Shamander Chaker; 1 April 1969 (age 57); Sidon, Lebanon
- Genres: Arabic classical, Arabic pop, Khaliji music, romance
- Occupations: Singer, philanthropist, songwriter, composer, pianist and record producer
- Instruments: Piano, electric piano, voice and oud
- Years active: 1996–present
- Labels: Khoyoul Records; Master Melody; Rotana; Benchmark
- Award: Joy Awards

Fadel Abdul Rahman Shamander Chaker (Arabic: فضل عبد الرحمن شمندر شاكر Arabic pronunciation: [fadˤl ʕabdurraħmaːn ʃamandar ʃaːkɪr]; also transliterated as Fadl Shaker, born 1 April 1969) is a Palestinian-Lebanese singer. During his musical career he was signed to Al Khouyoul Records and from 2003 onwards with Rotana Records.

In 2013 and after a career as a singer, Fadel Chaker joined the ranks of imam Ahmed al-Assir and participated in the 2013 Sidon clash. Since 2013, he is a wanted fugitive by the Lebanese government and has been hiding in Ain al-Hilweh Palestinian refugee camp. On 5 October 2025, the Lebanese Army Intelligence took custody of Fadel Shaker in Ain al-Hilweh camp after he agreed to surrender himself to the authorities.

== Background ==
He was born to a Palestinian father and a Lebanese mother in Lebanon. He grew up in a town close to the Ain al-Hilweh Palestinian camp in Lebanon.

== Music career ==
=== 1998–2011 ===
Fadl released his first album Wallah Zaman in 1998, which had eight original songs. The second album was Baya'a El Qolob released in 1999.

His third album was El Hob El Adem, released in 2000. His fourth album Hobak Khayal was released in 2001. In 2002, Fadl recorded and released his first duo. In 2003, Fadl released his ballad Ya Ghayeb to Arabic radio stations in the Middle East.

=== 2012–present ===
In 2018, eight years after his announced retirement, Chaker returned to the music world with the release of a new single which he intended to be the introduction theme song to a new Ramadan drama series that year. However, the song was rejected in the end by the production company "in respect to the Lebanese people", and instrumental music was used in the introduction to the series instead.

That same year, he was reported to be working on a new album entitled Yalla ma'al salama.

== Islamist militant involvement ==
During the early 2010s, Fadel Chaker publicly voiced support for the Syrian opposition and denounced the government of Bashar al-Assad for its repression of civilians, particularly members of the Sunni community. Around this period, he became affiliated with the radical Islamist movement led by Ahmed al-Assir. His alignment with al-Assir’s organization drew strong hostility from pro-Assad groups in Lebanon and Syria, including Alawite and Shiite factions sympathetic to the Syrian regime.

In June 2013, clashes broke out in an eastern suburb of Sidon after several people attacked, threw stones and shattered windows in a car belonging to Ahmad al-Assir's brother, Amjad al-Assir. Ahmad al-Assir then gave Hezbollah a one-week ultimatum to vacate apartments occupied by the group's supporters in the mostly Sunni city containing heavy weapon in a civilian compound, as clashes broke out with gunmen wielding automatic rifles and rocket-propelled grenades. Officials stated that the gunmen fighting Assir's followers were believed to be Hezbollah sympathizers.

On 23 June 2013, according to news channels loyal to Hezbollah, 10 Lebanese Army soldiers were killed and 35 wounded in a clash with armed men loyal to Assir, in Sidon at an Army post near the Abra complex that houses the Bilal bin Rabah Mosque. Other Lebanese news channels denied this and accused Hezbollah militias of being involved. Violence started with a deadly attack on an army checkpoint. Roads were later blocked in other parts of the country, and the army came under fire in the Ain el-Hilweh camp.

During 23–24 June 2013, heavy street fighting erupted between the Lebanese Army and gunmen loyal to Assir in Sidon. Sixteen Lebanese soldiers and more than twenty Assir supporters were killed.

Although Shaker was later accused of involvement in the 2013 Sidon clash between Ahmad al-Assir’s group and the Lebanese Army, Chaker has consistently denied any participation, asserting that he was falsely implicated due to his outspoken political and sectarian views.

== Trial and sentencing ==
After a trial in absentia by the Lebanese Military Tribunal, Chaker was sentenced on 16 December 2020 to a total of 22 years in prison with hard labour. He was accused by the Military Prosecutor General of having provided financial and logistical support to a terrorist group led by Sunni Muslim hardline cleric Ahmed al-Assir. 15 years of the sentence is for his "involvement in terrorist acts". The judge also added 7 more years of hard labour for Chaker's financing of Al-Assir's illegal armed group, with the court satisfied that he had personally paid for weapons and ammunition to the group. Chaker was reportedly still hiding as of 2020 in Ain el-Hilweh Palestinian refugee camp near Sidon since the unfolding of military confrontation of Al-Assir's group against the Lebanese Army.

On 4 October 2025, Chaker surrendered to Lebanese military intelligence in Ain el-Hilweh. He then appeared before a court in Beirut on 21 October for preliminary questioning. He was released on bail by a Lebanese military court in July 2026 while under investigation.

== Discography ==
=== Albums ===
- 1998: Walah Zaman [Al Khouyoul Records]
- 1999: Baya' El Oolob [Al Khouyoul Records]
- 2000: El Hob El Adeem [Al Khouyoul Records]
- 2000: Sahrat Tarab [Master Melody]
- 2001: Hobak Khayal [Al Khouyoul Records]
- 2003: Layali Beirut [Rotana Records]
- 2003: Sa'at Tarab maa Fadl Shaker Rotana Records
- 2003: Sidi Rouhi [Rotana Records]
- 2004: Saharni El Shok [Rotana Records]
- 2006: Allah Aalam [Rotana Records]
- 2009: Baada Aal Bal [Rotana Records]>
