= Osama Saad =

Lebanese politician

Osama Maarouf Saad (or Oussama Saad, Arabic: أسامة معروف سعد; born June 6, 1954, in Saida) is a Lebanese politician, MP, and the leader of the Popular Nasserist Organization (PNO) movement allied with Hezbollah, founded by his father Maarouf Saad, a leftist politician and mayor of Sidon whose violent assassination in 1975 helped spark the Lebanese Civil War.

Osama’s family is a prominent Sunni Muslim family in Sidon, but he aligns himself with the Shiite Hezbollah and the “axis of resistance”. He was subject to Hezbollah's online threats in 2021 after his PNO condemned the assassination of the anti-Hezbollah Lokman Slim.

== Biography ==
The son of former MP Maarouf Saad, assassinated on February 26, 1975, and a doctor of medicine from the University of Cairo, he became in 1985 the right arm of his brother, Mustafa Saad, head of the pro-Syrian Popular Nasserist Organization and historical rival of the family of Rafiq Hariri in Saïda as well as his sister, Bahia Hariri.

A member of the Saïda municipal council in 1998, he became a deputy at the Sunni headquarters of Saïda in the summer of 2002, following the death of his brother Moustapha, who was a deputy at the time. He was elected automatically for lack of competitors.

In 2004, he allied himself with the former Hariri partner, Abderrahman Bizri, and their list won the municipal elections in Saida, which was a serious setback for Rafiq Hariri for losing control over the elections of his hometown.

Osama Saad was re-elected as a deputy in the 2005 elections.

Pro-Syrian affirmed, supporter of Hezbollah and of General Michel Aoun, and supporter of the Palestinian arms Lebanon, he is also a member of the National Rally, led by Omar Karamé, the former Prime Minister, and of the Bloc of the Resistance and Development.

He made his return to the Lebanese parliament as a deputy for Saïda following his victory in the 2018 elections.
