= Maarouf Saad =

Lebanese politician (1910/1914-1975)

Maarouf Saad معروف سعد
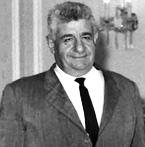

Member of Parliament (representing Sidon)
- In office 1957–1975
- Succeeded by: Nazih al-Bizri

Secretary-General of Popular Nasserite Organization
- In office 1973–1975
- Preceded by: Post established
- Succeeded by: Mustafa Saad

Personal details
- Born: 1910 or 1914 Sidon, Ottoman Lebanon
- Died: 6 March 1975 Sidon, Lebanon
- Party: Popular Nasserite Organization

Maarouf Saad (Arabic: معروف سعد; 1910 or 1914–6 March 1975) was a Lebanese politician and activist. He served as Sidon's representative in the Parliament of Lebanon between 1957 and 1972. He founded the Popular Nasserite Organization in 1973. Saad was known to have a charismatic and populist relationship with the residents of Sidon and the adjacent Palestinian refugee camps, according to historian Samir Khalaf. Nonetheless, tensions developed between Saad and the Palestine Liberation Organization in the 1970s as they competed for influence in Sidon. Saad's assassination sparked the Lebanese Civil War, and he is considered by many historians the conflict's first casualty.

== Early life ==
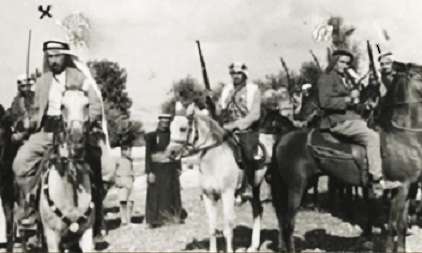
Saad (first person from the right under the "1" mark) as a volunteer during the 1936–39 Arab revolt in Palestine outside the village of Kafr Sur. First from the left underneath the "x" mark is Abd al-Rahim al-Hajj Muhammad.

Saad was born to a Sunni Muslim family in Sidon in 1910 or 1914. Unlike most of his political colleagues and rivals, Saad hailed from modest origins. According to the Maarouf Saad Cultural Center, he received his primary education at the Sidon Evangelical School and attended the Universal College of Aley, graduating in 1929. In 1930, he became a teacher, working in Lebanon, Palestine and Syria between then and 1936.

That year, he took part in organizing Palestinian Arab rebel activity in the revolt against the British authorities in Palestine. However, according to historian Samir Khalaf, when Saad left Lebanon to volunteer with the rebels in 1936, it was during the middle of his secondary schooling, not before he graduated. He served with Abd al-Rahim al-Hajj Muhammad's fasa'il (guerrilla unit). He was imprisoned by the British authorities and released in 1937. On his return to Lebanon, he helped organize activity against the French authorities in the country. He was consequently jailed in 1940, and released in 1944 (according to the MSCC) or 1945 (according to Khalaf). In 1945, he became a protege of the nationalist leader Riad al-Solh.

As he grew close to al-Solh in 1945, Saad was accepted into the security forces as a police officer. He served this role until 1957. In the early 1950s, Saad also worked as an athletics educator in Sidon's Maqased Benevolent Society. He had close relations with the Palestinian refugees who were present in the Sidon area in large numbers. He supported them politically and otherwise, while the Palestinian militias in turn offered him their backing. In the second half of the decade he became a staunch political follower of Egyptian President Gamal Abdel Nasser, who was seen by the general Arab population as the paramount leader of the pan-Arabist movement at the time.

== Political career ==
=== Early years ===
In 1957, Saad was elected to represent Sidon in the Parliament of Lebanon, beating his opponent Nazih al-Bizri. In 1958, tensions between the mostly Muslim and Druze opposition and the mostly Christian supporters of President Camille Chamoun—stemming from Chamoun's enmity with the United Arab Republic (a union between Egypt and Syria established in February), the government's attempts at containing political opposition, and the deployment of the US Sixth Fleet—erupted into countrywide civil strife in May. Saad was among many Lebanese notables from the United National Front opposition coalition to have visited Damascus and congratulated UAR President Nasser on the union's formation.

Saad used his Lebanese support base and allied Palestinian militias to gather arms and organize a defense of Sidon from government control, which he accomplished with ease. He headed a central command that oversaw an array of committees such as security, courts, military training and propaganda. With over 1,000 militiamen under his command, Saad led successful skirmishes against pro-government forces and prevented all government attempts at entering Sidon for the five-month duration of the crisis. While he frequently dispatched some of his men to aid opposition forces in neighboring areas, Saad's forces rarely launched attacks against regions outside Sidon. Saad regarded the 1958 crisis a "popular armed uprising", claiming the opposition was forced into it after initially advocating a general strike to pressure Chamoun to step down from the presidency.

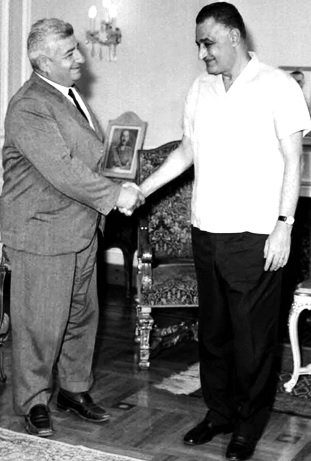
Saad (left) shaking hands with Egyptian President Gamal Abdel Nasser in Cairo, July 1967.

In the 1968 election he won the highest number of votes for the Sidon seat, defeating Bizri for the fourth consecutive time. While Bizri gained the support of most of the city's middle and upper classes and had the backing of the government, Saad—who normally represented the opposition to the national government—drew substantial support from Sidon's poorer residents. During his time in parliament, Saad was noted for his support for the cause of social justice and the Palestinian right of return. In Sidon, Saad gained a reputation for being a staunch opponent of discrimination and promoter of a comprehensive peace and social justice in the country. He co-founded the international Assembly of World Peace and helped contribute to the Organization for Solidarity of Asian and African People.

=== Wane of influence and tensions with PLO ===
While Saad was one of the staunchest Lebanese supporters of the Palestinian cause, he was also a critic of the PLO guerrillas' increasingly defiant attempts to gain control over Sidon, where Saad was traditionally dominant. In 1969 he was sharply criticized by the as-Saiqa, a Syrian-backed faction of the PLO, for not agreeing to support their fighters during a shootout with the Lebanese Army.

In August 1970, a group of PLO guerrillas from the Fatah and as-Saiqa factions based in the nearby Ain al-Hilweh camp came into conflict with Saad's Nasserist partisans, resulting in the death of one Nasserist fighter. The guerillas subsequently detained Saad in the camp and shut down his supporters' office in Sidon. A general strike in the area was declared as protest to Saad's detention and calls by incensed residents for the closing of guerrilla offices in Sidon were made. Saad was consequently released days later after intervention by an envoy sent by President Nasser.

Saad lost the 1972 parliamentary election. He alleged that Prime Minister Saeb Salam's support for Bizri in retaliation for Saad's participation in anti-government protests prior to the election caused his defeat. However, Salam's support for Bizri was only a partial reason for Saad's loss of votes. Another factor was that the roughly 1,000 voters of Palestinian origin in Sidon switched from their traditional support for Saad to Bizri during the election. By that time, the PLO had become much stronger in the area and did not require the political cover Saad had traditionally lent them. This became another source of tension between Saad and the PLO, who were then targeting Saad's traditional voting base: the pan-Arabist sympathizers of the Old City of Sidon and local leftists. This also contributed to the waning of Saad's reputation as the "man of the people" in the city.

Saad had become the chairman of Sidon's municipal council in the early 1970s, in effect becoming its mayor. However, Salam ordered the council dissolved in 1973 to Saad's protestations. That year, Saad founded the Popular Nasserite Organization, a group espousing Arab nationalism and socialism in the tradition of Nasser, who died in September 1970. He also headed Sidon's fishermen's union. Relations between Sidon's residents and the government grew increasingly tense, partly a result of Saad's own increasingly antagonistic relationship with the national government.

== Death and aftermath ==
In late 1974, the fishing enterprise Protéine, owned by former president and Saad opponent Chamoun, attempted to streamline fishing off of Sidon's coast, and monopolize the fish trade there. Chamoun offered to salary some of Sidon's unionized fishermen, but they largely objected. Pressured by his popular base, Saad organized a general strike and large demonstrations against Protéine's announced move on 26 February 1975. He declared he was defending his "hometown's downtrodden poor". During the protests, Saad was shot and severely wounded, reportedly by a Lebanese Army sniper. He died of his injury in a Beirut hospital on 6 March.

Saad's killing brought his family and the PNO widespread public sympathy and boosted their reputation among the Lebanese left and the Sunni Muslim community. Despite his previous tensions with the PLO, Saad's funeral in Sidon on 7 March became a scene of Lebanese-Palestinian solidarity and was the second largest public show of support for the PLO in Lebanese history, quickly becoming a huge anti-government protest. Subsequently, countrywide small-scale clashes erupted between Saad's supporters—Lebanese and Palestinian, including the PLO—and the Lebanese Army. Sidon was shut down for weeks because of the violence and a bomb destroyed Protéine's office in Beirut. By late March, 19 people had died in the confrontations. By 13 April, the skirmishes evolved into open warfare between rival forces in the country.

Saad's assassination is attributed by many analysts to have been the spark that set off the Lebanese Civil War, or at least one of its chief catalysts. It is more generally accepted that the attack on a Palestinian bus by Phalangist militiamen a few weeks after Saad's death marked the beginning of the civil war.

== Personal life ==
Saad had two sons, Mustafa and Ousama, and five daughters, Mona, Jamileh Saad Younes, Wafaa, Shahnaz Saad and Roula Saad, some of whom became involved to various degrees in Lebanese politics as part of the PNO. Mustafa served in the Lebanese parliament until his death in 2002 and during the civil war, founded a military wing for the PNO. Ousama succeeded his brother as Sidon's MP after his death and was reelected in 2005. He lost to the Future Movement candidate in 2009, but stayed the secretary-general of the PNO and maintained an active Nasserist presence in the city of Sidon within the broad March 8 coalition in Lebanese politics. On 6 May 2018, he took advantage of the new electoral law and was reelected to the parliament. Meanwhile, Mona Saad continues to head the Maarouf Saad Social and Cultural Foundation.

== See also ==
- List of assassinated Lebanese politicians
- List of political families in Lebanon

== Bibliography ==
- Dib, Kamal (2004), Warlords and Merchants: The Lebanese Business and Political Establishment, Garnet & Ithaca Press, ISBN 9780863722974
- Gendzier, Irene L. (2006), Notes from the Minefield: United States Intervention in Lebanon and the Middle East, 1945–1958, Columbia University Press, ISBN 9780231140119
- Joint Publications Research Services (1975), Translations on Near East and North Africa, Issues 1321–1332, ISBN 9780231505369
- Khalaf, Samir (2013), Civil and Uncivil Violence in Lebanon: A History of the Internationalization of Communal Conflict, Columbia University Press, ISBN 9780231505369
- El-Khazen, Farid (2000), The Breakdown of the State in Lebanon: 1967–1976, Tauris, ISBN 9781860643200
- Mardelli, Bassil A. (2012), Middle East Perspectives: From Lebanon, iUniverse, ISBN 9781475906721
- Morgan, Clive R. (2004), A British Banker in the Arab World: The Memoirs of Clive R. Morgan, O.B.E., F.C.I.B., F.R.S.A., AuthorHouse, ISBN 9781467096652
- Reich, Bernard (1990), Political Leaders of the Contemporary Middle East and North Africa: A Biographical Dictionary, Greenwood Publishing Group, ISBN 9780313262135
- Zuwiyya, Jalal (1972), The Parliamentary Election of Lebanon 1968, BRILL, ISBN 9781467096652
