= 2013 Sidon clash =

Part of the Syrian civil war spillover in Lebanon

- Part of the Syrian civil war spillover in Lebanon
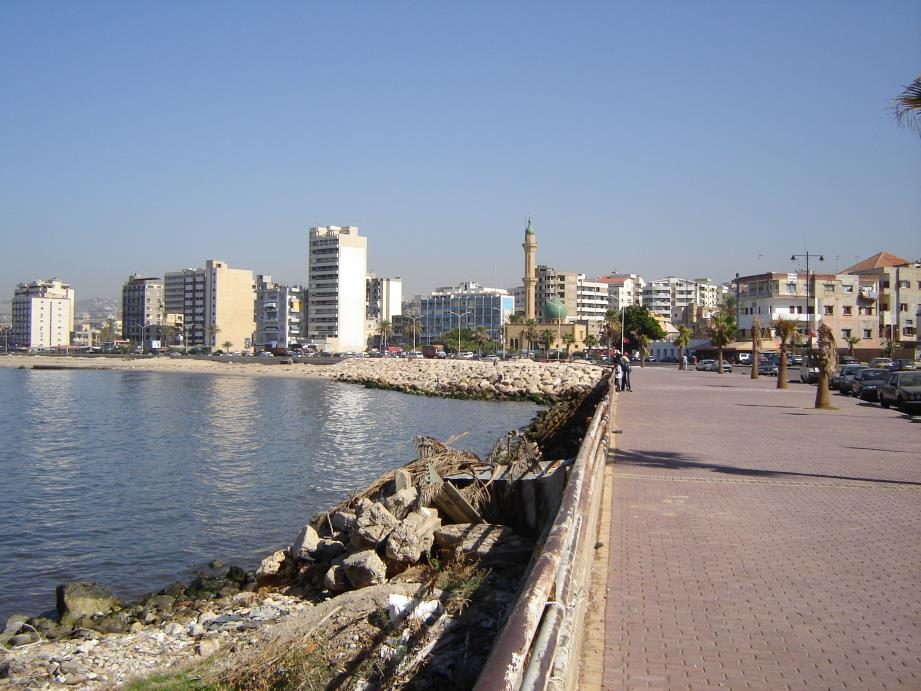
| Date | 23–25 June 2013 (2 days) |
| Location | Sidon, Lebanon |
| Result | Lebanese Army & Hezbollah victory: The Lebanese Army secures the city, militants escape |

Belligerents
| Lebanon; Lebanese Army; Internal Security Forces; Hezbollah (Disputed); Lebanese Resistance Brigades | Al-Assir militants |

Commanders and leaders
| General Jean Kahwaji; General Chamel Roukoz | Ahmed al-Assir |

Strength
| 2,000 soldiers | 300 fighters |

Casualties and losses
| Lebanese Army: 18 killed 100–128 wounded 4 vehicles damaged | Al-Assir militants: 25–40 killed 60 wounded 65–70 captured |
- 2 civilians killed 50 people killed overall

The June 2013 Sidon clash in June 2013 was part of the Syrian civil war spillover in Lebanon, and involved the Lebanese Army, Hezbollah militants, and Sunni militants in the city of Sidon, Lebanon. Clashes between the followers of Ahmed al-Assir resulted in the deaths of 18 soldiers, 25–40 al-Assir gunmen, two civilians, and according to some sources, four Hezbollah fighters. The clashes were the deadliest since the Syria-related internal conflict in Lebanon began in 2011.

== Background ==
The Syrian civil war has heightened sectarian tensions within Lebanon, particularly between Sunni and Shia Muslims, many of whom support opposing sides and have entered the conflict in large numbers. Hezbollah leader Hassan Nasrallah announced on 25 May that Hezbollah would openly support President Bashar al-Assad's forces in fighting the insurgency in Syria. Some Sunni leaders in Lebanon have likewise at various points in time called for Jihad against the Assad government in Syria, and urged the Lebanese to join.

In June 2013, clashes broke out in an eastern suburb of Sidon after several people attacked, threw stones at, and shattered the windows of, a car belonging to Amjad al-Assir, the brother of Hezbollah critic and hard-line cleric Sheik Ahmad al-Assir. Al-Assir then gave Hezbollah a one-week ultimatum to vacate apartments occupied by the group's supporters in the mostly Sunni city. Clashes broke out between gunmen backing Hezbollah and Sheik al-Assir, both sides wielding automatic rifles and rocket-propelled grenades. Officials stated that the gunmen fighting al-Assir's followers were believed to be Hezbollah sympathizers.

Lebanese army troops deployed in the area of the fighting, which subsided after several hours. The military called on gunmen to withdraw immediately from the streets.

== Fighting ==
On 23 June 2013, heavy street fighting erupted between the Lebanese Army, with Hezbollah military backing, and gunmen loyal to al-Assir, with a clash at an Army checkpoint near the Abra complex that houses the Bilal bin Rabah Mosque. McClatchy News and The Times of London reported that Hezbollah forces backed the army. Roads were later blocked in other parts of the country, and the army came under fire in the Ain el-Hilweh camp.

The next day, the Lebanese army launched a crackdown on the pro-Assir militia attacking houses near his mosque in Sidon from which Assir operates. At least four tanks and several army vehicles were destroyed. Lebanese Army commandos seized a complex controlled by gunmen loyal to Sheikh Ahmad Assir. Assir reportedly fled the complex at around 10 a.m., shortly after the Army stormed the premises which the military gradually gained control over throughout the day. Twenty-two bodies were pulled out of Assir's mosque after the Army captured it. Sources said soldiers were still trading gunfire with snipers located on the rooftops of nearby buildings. Ahmed al-Assir was still at large with the Army having orders to capture or kill him after he was accused of killing soldiers in "cold blood". Sixty-five to 70 gunmen, including several non-Lebanese nationals, reportedly either surrendered or were captured by Army units during the raid on the complex. Lebanon's military prosecutor issued arrest warrants against Assir and 123 of his followers. The warrants included the names of Assir's brother, and singer Fadl Shaker, who gave up his singing career to follow al-Assir.

The raid on the compound at noon came after an attempt by a group of Salafi preachers to mediate a truce reached a dead end, with the Army determined to continue its operations until Assir was captured and his followers crushed, the sources said. Some sources claimed Hezbollah fighters had backed the Lebanese Army, but this was strongly denied by Lebanese Defence Minister Fayez Ghosn, who insisted the army fought alone.

Overall, at least 50 people died during the fighting. Seventeen to 18 soldiers, 25–40 militants and reportedly four Hezbollah fighters were killed. Two civilians were killed, including a bodyguard of a cleric who tried to reach the fighting to negotiate a ceasefire. One hundred to 128 Lebanese soldiers, 60 pro-Assir militants, over 50 civilians and reportedly 15 Hezbollah fighters were wounded.

== Aftermath ==
Partly as a result of Assir's calls for help while holed up in his mosque in Sidon, thousands of youths in the outskirts of a slum in Cairo, Egypt attacked a Shia gathering there and killed its leader and three of his followers. Assir denounced the army as Shia stooges and urged soldiers to defect from the Lebanese army and join him, but this was condemned by the grand mufti of Lebanon.

After McClatchy News and The Times of London reported that the Lebanese Army had fought alongside Hezbollah in the battle, the Army threatened legal action against news institutions that made such reports. Shortly after those threats, video of Hezbollah fighting alongside the Army was broadcast on Lebanese television. The Army also came under fire from human rights activists for the videotaped beating of one detainee from the battle and the death during questioning of a second arrestee.

On 4 October 2025, Chaker, who went into hiding after being accused of incitement during the clash, surrendered to Lebanese military intelligence in Ain al-Hilweh.

== See also ==
- List of wars involving Lebanon
- 3rd Infantry Brigade (Lebanon)
