= Ahmed al-Assir =

Lebanese Imam

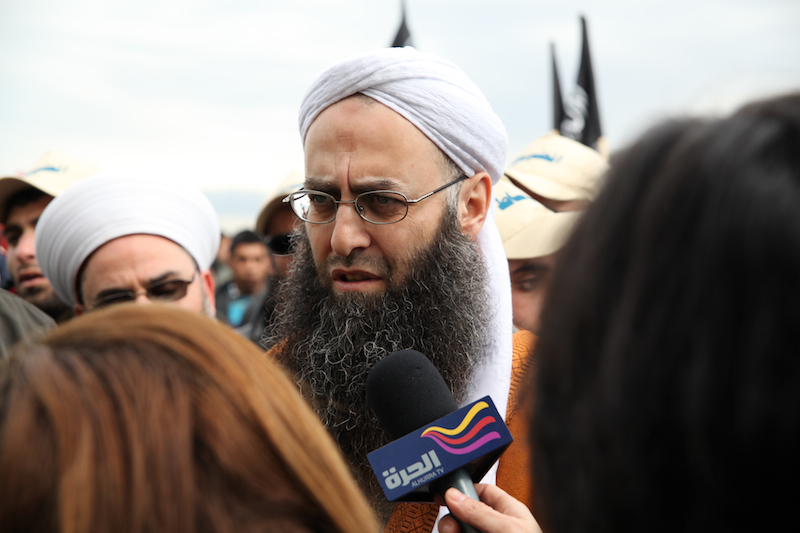
Sheikh Ahmed al-Assir

Personal life
- Born: 5 May 1968 (age 58) Sidon, Lebanon
- Occupation: Cleric

Religious life
- Religion: Islam
- Denomination: Salafi

Ahmed al-Assir (Arabic: أحمد الأسير; born 5 May 1968) is a Lebanese former Sunni Imam of the Bilal Bin Rabah Mosque in Sidon (considered by some a Salafi). He was convicted of terrorism and murder by the Lebanese Military court and is currently serving a life imprisonment sentence. The military prosecution was a result of al-Assir organizing and perpetrating a terrorist attack and attempted military coup against the Lebanese army and civilians in city of Abra, Sidon on June 23-24, 2013. After being a wanted fugitive for years, Al-Assir was detained on 15 August 2015 by Lebanese General Security officials while attempting to flee to Egypt using a forged passport at Beirut International Airport. Upon his capture, it was revealed that he had undergone physical changes in appearance and attire; with a shaved beard, new clothing style and facial modifications, suggesting the use of plastic surgery.

With his increasing involvement in regional politics, especially after the Syrian Civil War, he became a notorious personality in Lebanon's political landscape, and frequently agitated against Iran and Hezbollah.

On 28 September 2017, Al-Assir was sentenced to death. However, his sentence was later commuted to life in person and hard labor, which he is currently serving.

== Background ==
Al-Assir is from a mixed background - his mother is a Shia from the south of Lebanon, and his father is a Sunni from Sidon. He came from a non-religious artistic home, but later convinced his father not to play music. He has two wives and three children. According to one of his sisters, he was once a supporter of Hezbollah, but withdrew his support when Hezbollah and the Lebanese Shiite withdrew their focus from Israel and begun to exert excessive force on the delicate sectarian balance of Lebanon.

Assir's notoriety increased after a series of sermons and public exhibitions criticizing Hezbollah, a once untouchable symbol in the Lebanese political landscape. He also caused controversy by openly criticizing figures within the militia such as secretary general and spokesperson Sayed Hassan Nasrallah. Many of his speeches are critical of Hezbollah's, Iran's and the Arab Baath Party's support for Syrian President Bashar al-Assad. Assir has stated that he is only against Shias that follow the teachings of Khomeini. Assir has attempted to become a leader of the Sunnis of Lebanon, without success. Currently he is not considered a mainstream Sunni Scholar; however, his aggressive and emotional rhetoric against Hezbollah's intervention in Syria has gained him headlines and controversy, along with attracting many supporters and followers disillusioned with the traditionally Sunni Future Movement party and the leadership of Saad Hariri.

== 2012 sit-ins ==
In August 2012, Al-Assir and his supporters staged a sit in in the southern city of Sidon to protest against Hezbollah's weaponry. This led to tensions, and later clashes between Assir-supporters and members of the Popular Nasserist Organization. An AFP photographer was beaten by security forces during the clashes. The following day, counter-protests were held by members of the PNO.

On 8 August, a gunfight between supporters and rivals of Assir wounded five, including two women.

== Military Clashes ==
=== 2012 Sidon clash ===
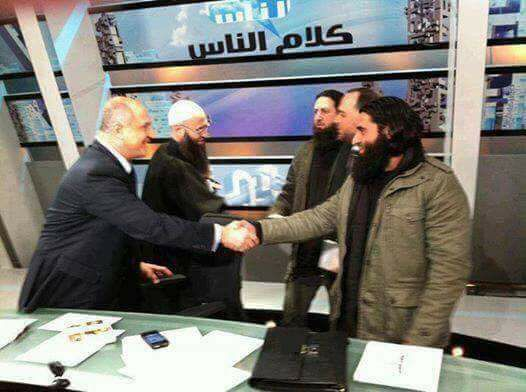
Marcel Ghanem hosting Ahmed al-Assir in his political talk show Kalam El-Nas

On 11 November 2012, three people were killed and four others wounded after supporters of Assir clashed with supporters of Hezbollah in the southern city of Sidon. Assir stated "We have a blood score to settle with Hezbollah that can only be settled with blood", and that he considered forming an "armed resistance group" to defend Lebanon from Israel as he believed that Hezbollah's weapons had now been pointed internally.

=== Syrian civil war ===
In April 2013, Assir urged his Syrian followers to join the Syrian rebels by claiming that "There is now no other choice but to defend our (Sunni) people in Syria," and assuring that "There is a religious duty on every Muslim who is able to do so... to enter into Syria in order to defend its people, its mosques and religious shrines, especially in Qusayr and Homs", adding that "This fatwa (religious decree) affects us all, especially those who have military experience." Assir also announced the establishment of "Free resistance battalions" in Sidon.

=== 2013 Sidon clashes ===
In June 2013, clashes broke out in an eastern suburb of Sidon after several people attacked, threw stones and shattered windows in a car belonging to Assir's brother, Amjad al-Assir. Assir then gave Hezbollah a one-week ultimatum to vacate apartments occupied by the group's supporters in the mostly Sunni city containing heavy weapon in a civilian compound, as clashes broke out with gunmen wielding automatic rifles and rocket-propelled grenades. Officials stated that the gunmen fighting Assir's followers were believed to be Hezbollah sympathizers.

On 23 June 2013, according to news channels loyal to Hezbollah, 10 Lebanese Army soldiers were killed and 35 wounded in a clash with armed men loyal to Assir, in Sidon at an Army post near the Abra complex that houses the Bilal bin Rabah Mosque. Other Lebanese news channels denied this and accused Hezbollah militias of being involved. Violence started with a deadly attack on an army checkpoint. Roads were later blocked in other parts of the country, and the army came under fire in the Ain el-Hilweh camp.

During 23–24 June 2013, heavy street fighting erupted between the Lebanese Army and gunmen loyal to Assir in Sidon. Sixteen Lebanese soldiers and more than twenty Assir supporters were killed. A bodyguard of a cleric, who tried to reach the fighting to negotiate a ceasefire, also died. More than 100 Lebanese soldiers were wounded, as well as 13 pro-Assir militants. The Lebanese army requested for the country's politicians to intervene. On Monday June 24, 2013, Lebanese Army commandos seized a complex controlled by gunmen loyal to Assir in the southern city of Sidon, shortly after he fled the premises to an unknown destination.

Assir reportedly fled the complex at around 10 a.m., shortly after the Army stormed the premises which the military gradually gained control over throughout the day. Sources said soldiers were still trading gunfire with snipers located on the rooftops of nearby buildings. Sixty-five gunmen, including several Palestinian and Syrian refugees, reportedly either surrendered or were captured by Army units during the raid on the complex. Lebanon's military prosecutor issued arrest warrants against Assir and 123 of his followers. The warrants also included the name of Assir's brother.

The raid on the compound at noon came after an attempt by a group of Salafi preachers to mediate a truce reached a dead end, with the Army determined to continue its operations. There is no factual basis for the claim that Assir was captured and his followers crushed. His fate remains unknown, however, the army is treating the matter as a capture or kill operation on the basis that they believe it was only Assir that killed Lebanese soldiers in "cold blood", according to a military statement.

== Military Court prosecution ==
In February 2014, it was reported that military courts were seeking the death penalty for Ahmed al-Assir, and prison terms for up to 20 of his followers. According to Lebanese authorities, al-Assir was arrested at Beirut airport in August 2015. On 28 September 2017, the Lebanese Military Courts declared the verdict of death penalty for Assir.
