= Popular Nasserist Organization =

Popular Nasserist Organization التنظيم الشعبي الناصري
- Abbreviation: PNO
- Leader: Osama Saad
- Founder: Maarouf Saad
- Founded: 1973
- Headquarters: Sidon
- Ideology: Nasserism; Arab socialism Arab nationalism Pan-Arabism; Anti-Zionism; Anti-imperialism; Left-wing nationalism Secularism; Nonsectarianism; Pro-Iran; 1990-2024: Pro-Syria; 1975-1990: Pro-Eastern Bloc; Sovietism
- Political position: Left-wing to far-left
- Regional affiliation: PSOM (historical)
- Parliament of Lebanon: 1 / 128
- Cabinet of Lebanon: 0 / 24

Party flag

The Popular Nasserist Organization – PNO (Arabic: التنظيم الشعبي الناصري, romanized: Al-Tanzim al-Sha'aby al-Nassery) is a Sidon-based Nasserist party originally formed in 1973 by Maarouf Saad, a Sunni Muslim pan-Arab politician and member of Parliament (MP) later killed by the Lebanese Army during a February 1975 dock strike held in that port city.

== Military structure and organization ==
National Liberation Army
- جيش التحرير الوطني
- Leaders: Mustafa Saad; Osama Saad
- Dates active: 1975–1990
- Headquarters: Sidon
- Ideology: Nasserism; Arab socialism Arab nationalism Pan-Arabism; Anti-Zionism
- Size: 500–1,000 figthers
- Part of: Lebanese National Movement (LNM); Lebanese National Resistance Front (Jammoul)

The PNO's military wing, the National Liberation Army – NLA (Arabic: جيش التحرير الوطني, romanized: Jayish al-Tahrir al-Watani) or Armée de Liberation Nationale (ALN) in French, was founded in March 1975 at Sidon by Mustafa Saad, son of the late Maarouf. Secretly trained and armed by Fatah, the NLA was initially financed by Yasser Arafat's organization and Libya, later replaced in the mid-1980s by the Sidon-born Saudi-Lebanese millionaire Rafic Hariri, in order to protect his business interests in the Sidon area. A small but disciplined fighting force, predominately Sunni Muslim with some Shia Muslims and Christians, the NLA comprised some 500-1,000 uniformed male and female fighters organized into conventional 'Commando', Infantry, Signals, and Military Police branches.

=== Weapons and equipment ===
Most of the NLA's own weapons and equipment were provided by the PLO, Libya and Syria or pilfered from Lebanese Armed Forces (LAF) and Internal Security Forces (ISF) reserves after their collapse in January 1976. Additional weaponry, vehicles and other, non-lethal military equipment were procured in the international black market.

==== Small-arms ====
PNO/NLA infantry and 'Commando' units were provided with a variety of small arms, comprising MAT-49 and PPSh-41 submachine guns, MAS-49, M1 Garand (or its Italian-produced copy, the Beretta Model 1952) and SKS semi-automatic rifles, AMD-65 assault carbines, Heckler & Koch G3, FN FAL, M16A1, AK-47 and AKM assault rifles (other variants included the Zastava M70, Chinese Type 56, Romanian Pistol Mitralieră model 1963/1965, Bulgarian AKK/AKKS and former East German MPi-KMS-72 assault rifles).

Several models of handguns were used, such as Colt Cobra .38 Special snub-nose revolvers, Colt M1911A1, Tokarev TT-33, Makarov PM, CZ 75, FN P35 and MAB PA-15 pistols. Squad weapons consisted of RPK, RPD, PK/PKM, FN MAG and M60 light machine guns, with heavier Browning M1919A4 .30 Cal, Browning M2HB .50 Cal, SG-43/SGM Goryunov and DShKM machine guns being employed as platoon and company weapons.

Grenade launchers and portable anti-tank weapons included M203 grenade launchers, and M72 LAW and RPG-7 rocket launchers, whilst crew-served and indirect fire weapons comprised B-10 82mm, B-11 107mm and M40A1 106mm recoilless rifles (often mounted on technicals).

==== Armoured and transport vehicles ====
Like other Lebanese militias, the NLA fielded a 'mechanized' corps provided with a single UR-416 armoured car seized from the Lebanese Forces in 1985, plus 40 all-terrain vehicles converted into technicals. The latter consisted mostly of Suzuki Jimny LJ20 1st generation off-road mini SUVs, Land-Rover series II-III, Toyota Land Cruiser (J43), Toyota Land Cruiser (J70), Toyota Land Cruiser (J75), GMC Sierra Custom K25/K30, Datsun 620 and Datsun 720 pickup trucks, and Dodge Fargo/Power Wagon W200 light trucks armed with heavy machine-guns, recoilless rifles and anti-aircraft autocannons.

==== Artillery ====
Soviet ZPU-1 and ZPU-2 14.5mm and ZU-23-2 23mm Anti-aircraft autocannons (mostly mounted on technicals) were employed in both air defense and direct fire supporting roles. In addition to AA autocannons, the NLA also fielded a few ex-PLO BM-11 122mm multiple rocket launchers.

== The PNO and NLA in the Civil War 1975–1990 ==
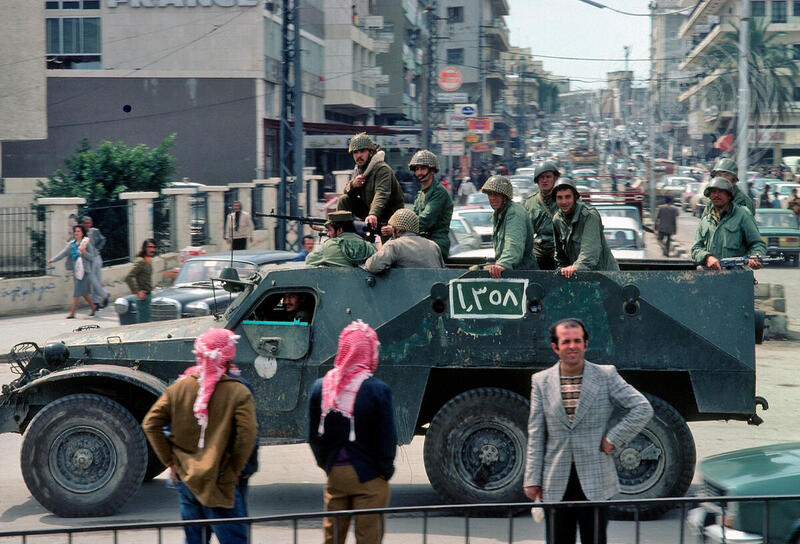
A Syrian BTR-152 armoured personnel carrier patrols the streets of the Lebanese port city of Saida (Sidon), March 1978.

Closely allied with the Al-Mourabitoun, the PNO/NLA joined the Lebanese National Movement (LNM) in April 1975, playing a somewhat significant role in the controversial siege of the Christian coastal town of Damour alongside the Al-Mourabitoun, the PLO and Palestine Liberation Army units on 20–22 January 1976. It later took part in the 'Spring offensive' held in March of that year on the Mount Lebanon region.

Forced to go underground during the June 1982 Israeli invasion of Lebanon when the Israel Defence Forces (IDF) occupied Sidon, in July 1983 the PNO/NLA joined the Lebanese National Salvation Front (LNSF), a Palestinian- and Syrian-backed military coalition that rallied several Lebanese Muslim and Christian parties and militias opposed to the U.S.-sponsored May 17 Agreement with Israel. The NLA resurfaced in the wake of the Israeli pull-out from southern Lebanon in March–April 1985, and fought alongside the Palestinians at the battles for Kfar-Fallus and Jezzine against the Israeli-backed South Lebanese Army (SLA).

Simultaneously, during the Coastal War they joined in another Syrian-backed coalition with the Druze Progressive Socialist Party (PSP), the Sunni Al-Mourabitoun and the Shi'ite Amal Movement, which defeated the Christian Lebanese Forces (LF) attempts to establish bridgeheads at Damour and Sidon.

== The post-war years ==
The PNO is led today by Osama Saad, who is an MP in the Lebanese Parliament, and is active in the city of Sidon. It was affiliated with the March 8 Alliance until the 2019 protests in Lebanon, which the party supports.

== See also ==
- Arab Socialist Union (Lebanon)
- Al-Mourabitoun
- Damour massacre
- Lebanese National Movement
- Lebanese Civil War
- List of armed groups in the Syrian Civil War
- List of weapons of the Lebanese Civil War
- Mountain War (Lebanon)
- Nasserism
- People's Liberation Army (Lebanon)
- 3rd Infantry Brigade (Lebanon)
